= Dresden II – Bautzen II =

Federal electoral district of Germany

159 Dresden II – Bautzen II
- Electoral district for the Bundestag
- Dresden II – Bautzen II in 2025
- State: Saxony
- Population: 302,000 (2019)
- Electorate: 234,432 (2021)
- Major settlements: Dresden (partial); Radeberg
- Area: 417.7 km^{2}

Current electoral district
- Created: 1990
- Party: AfD
- Member: Matthias Rentzsch
- Elected: 2025

Dresden II – Bautzen II is an electoral constituency (German: Wahlkreis) represented in the Bundestag. It elects one member via first-past-the-post voting. Under the current constituency numbering system, it is designated as constituency 159. It is located in central Saxony, comprising the northern and western part of the city of Dresden and a small part of the Bautzen district.

Dresden II – Bautzen II was created for the inaugural 1990 federal election after German reunification. From 2021 to 2025, it was represented by Lars Rohwer of the Christian Democratic Union (CDU). Since 2025 it has been represented by Matthias Rentzsch of the AfD.

== Geography ==
Dresden II – Bautzen II is located in central Saxony. As of the 2021 federal election, it comprises the municipalities of Arnsdorf, Großröhrsdorf, Ottendorf-Okrilla, Radeberg, and Wachau from the Bautzen district as well as the entirety of the independent city of Dresden excluding the Ortsamtsbereiche of Altstadt, Blasewitz, Leuben, Plauen, and Prohlis.

== History ==
Dresden II – Bautzen II was created after German reunification in 1990, then known as Dresden II. In the 2002 and 2005 elections, it was named Dresden II – Meißen I. It acquired its current name in the 2009 election. In the 1990 through 1998 elections, it was constituency 319 in the numbering system. In the 2002 through 2009 elections, it was number 161. In the 2013 through 2021 elections, it was number 160. From the 2025 election, it has been number 159.

Originally, the constituency comprised the Stadtbezirke of Mitte, Nord, and West from the city of Dresden. In the 2002 and 2005 elections it comprised the municipalities of Coswig, Radebeul, Radeburg, Moritzburg, Niederau, and Weinböhla from the Meißen district, as well as the entirety of the city of Dresden excluding the Stadtbezirke of Altstadt, Blasewitz, Leuben, Plauen, and Prohlis. It acquired its current borders in the 2009 election.

Election	No.	Name	Borders
1990	319	Dresden II	Dresden city (only Mitte, Nord, and West Stadtbezirke)
1994	319	Dresden II	Dresden city (only Mitte, Nord, and West Stadtbezirke)
1998	319	Dresden II	Dresden city (only Mitte, Nord, and West Stadtbezirke)
2002	161	Dresden II – Meißen I	Dresden city (except Altstadt, Blasewitz, Leuben, Plauen, and Prohlis Ortsamtsbereiche); Meißen district (only Coswig, Radebeul, Radeburg, Moritzburg, Niederau, and Weinböhla municipalities)
2005	161	Dresden II – Meißen I	Dresden city (except Altstadt, Blasewitz, Leuben, Plauen, and Prohlis Ortsamtsbereiche); Meißen district (only Coswig, Radebeul, Radeburg, Moritzburg, Niederau, and Weinböhla municipalities)
2009	161	Dresden II – Bautzen II	Dresden city (except Altstadt, Blasewitz, Leuben, Plauen, and Prohlis Ortsamtsbereiche); Bautzen district (only Arnsdorf, Großröhrsdorf, Ottendorf-Okrilla, Radeberg, and Wachau municipalities)
2013	160	Dresden II – Bautzen II	Dresden city (except Altstadt, Blasewitz, Leuben, Plauen, and Prohlis Ortsamtsbereiche); Bautzen district (only Arnsdorf, Großröhrsdorf, Ottendorf-Okrilla, Radeberg, and Wachau municipalities)
2017	160	Dresden II – Bautzen II	Dresden city (except Altstadt, Blasewitz, Leuben, Plauen, and Prohlis Ortsamtsbereiche); Bautzen district (only Arnsdorf, Großröhrsdorf, Ottendorf-Okrilla, Radeberg, and Wachau municipalities)
2021	160	Dresden II – Bautzen II	Dresden city (except Altstadt, Blasewitz, Leuben, Plauen, and Prohlis Ortsamtsbereiche); Bautzen district (only Arnsdorf, Großröhrsdorf, Ottendorf-Okrilla, Radeberg, and Wachau municipalities)
2025	159	Dresden II – Bautzen II	Dresden city (except Altstadt, Blasewitz, Leuben, Plauen, and Prohlis Ortsamtsbereiche); Bautzen district (only Arnsdorf, Großröhrsdorf, Ottendorf-Okrilla, Radeberg, and Wachau municipalities)

== Members ==
The constituency was first represented by Johannes Nitsch of the Christian Democratic Union (CDU) from 1990 to 1998. Arnold Vaatz was elected in 1998, and re-elected in 2002, 2005, 2009, 2013, and 2017. He was succeeded by Lars Rohwer in 2021.

Election	Member	Party	%
1990	Johannes Nitsch	CDU	46.5
1994	Johannes Nitsch	CDU	46.9
1998	Arnold Vaatz	CDU	37.1
2002	Arnold Vaatz	CDU	37.0
2005	Arnold Vaatz	CDU	35.2
2009	Arnold Vaatz	CDU	36.4
2013	Arnold Vaatz	CDU	41.8
2017	Arnold Vaatz	CDU	25.5
2021	Lars Rohwer	CDU	18.6
2025	Matthias Rentzsch	AfD	29.9

== Election results ==
=== 2025 election ===
Federal election (2025): Dresden II – Bautzen II
Notes:	Blue background denotes the winner of the electorate vote. Pink background denotes a candidate elected from their party list. Yellow background denotes an electorate win by a list member, or other incumbent. A ✓ or ✗ denotes status of any incumbent, win or lose respectively.						
Party	Candidate	Votes	%	±%	Party votes	%	±%
AfD	Matthias Rentzsch	58,240	29.9	▲11.3	55,902	28.6	▲9.5
CDU	✗ Lars Rohwer	47,108	24.2	▲5.5	35,306	18.1	▲4.2
Left	Clara Bünger	31,962	16.4	▲4.6	31,002	15.9	▲4.7
Greens	Merle Spellerberg	22,140	11.4	▼2.2	25,517	13.1	▼3.6
SPD	Stephan Schumann	18,245	9.4	▼5.9	16,601	8.5	▼7.8
BSW					15,247	7.8	New
FDP	Benita Horst	5,130	2.6	▼8.4	6,947	3.6	▼8.6
Volt	Sina Alex	3,723	1.9	New	2,142	1.1	▲0.6
Tierschutzpartei					2,045	1.0	▼0.7
FW	Theodor Benad	3,252	1.7	▼0.1	1,883	1.0	▼0.9
PARTEI	Melanie Buntrock	3,145	1.6	▼0.7	1,412	0.7	▼1.0
BD	Steffen Große	1,497	0.8	New	614	0.3	New
Pirates					514	0.3	▼0.6
Humanists					222	0.1	▼0.1
MLPD	Andrea Ebert	337	0.2	0.0	102	0.1	0.0
Informal votes		1,554			877		
Total valid votes		194,779			195,456		
Turnout		196,333	84.1	▲3.3			
AfD gain from CDU	Majority	11,132	5.7	N/A			

=== 2021 election ===
Federal election (2021): Dresden II – Bautzen II
Notes:	Blue background denotes the winner of the electorate vote. Pink background denotes a candidate elected from their party list. Yellow background denotes an electorate win by a list member, or other incumbent. A ✓ or ✗ denotes status of any incumbent, win or lose respectively.						
Party	Candidate	Votes	%	±%	Party votes	%	±%
CDU	Lars Rohwer	35,014	18.6	▼6.9	26,037	13.8	▼9.3
AfD	Andreas Harlaß	34,979	18.6	▼3.7	36,003	19.2	▼4.1
SPD	Stephan Schumann	28,700	15.3	▲4.1	30,620	16.3	▲6.6
Greens	Merle Spellerberg	25,527	13.6	▲5.0	31,265	16.6	▲7.7
Left	Silvio Lang	22,160	11.8	▼5.7	20,913	11.1	▼6.2
FDP	Silke Müller	20,711	11.0	▲4.1	22,884	12.2	▲2.6
Tierschutzpartei					3,271	1.7	▲0.4
PARTEI	Charlotte Brock	4,292	2.3	▼0.4	3,252	1.7	▼0.3
dieBasis	Anke Althoff	3,726	2.0		3,661	1.9	
FW	Korvin Lemke	3,309	1.8	▲0.3	3,464	1.8	▲0.8
Independent	Frank Hannig	3,223	1.7				
Pirates	Anne Herpertz	2,694	1.4	0.0	1,709	0.9	▲0.1
Gesundheitsforschung	Andreas Kabus	1,366	0.7		1,099	0.6	
Volt					900	0.5	
ÖDP	Florian Busch	1,054	0.6	▼0.6	641	0.3	▼0.3
Team Todenhöfer					607	0.3	
Independent	Jens Düvelshaupt	497	0.3				
Humanists					424	0.2	
NPD					307	0.2	▼0.6
Bündnis C					256	0.1	
V-Partei3					226	0.1	▼0.1
BüSo	Michael Gründler	210	0.1	▼0.2			
The III. Path					188	0.1	
MLPD	Günter Slave	298	0.2	0.0	150	0.1	▼0.1
DKP					128	0.1	
Informal votes		1,649			1,404		
Total valid votes		187,760			188,005		
Turnout		189,409	80.8	▲1.5			
CDU hold	Majority	35	0.0	▼3.2			

=== 2017 election ===
Federal election (2017): Dresden II – Bautzen II
Notes:	Blue background denotes the winner of the electorate vote. Pink background denotes a candidate elected from their party list. Yellow background denotes an electorate win by a list member, or other incumbent. A ✓ or ✗ denotes status of any incumbent, win or lose respectively.						
Party	Candidate	Votes	%	±%	Party votes	%	±%
CDU	✓ Arnold Vaatz	47,185	25.5	▼16.3	42,792	23.1	▼15.5
AfD	Anka Willms	41,202	22.3		43,126	23.3	▲16.3
Left	Tilo Kießling	32,397	17.5	▼1.6	32,040	17.3	▼0.8
SPD	Richard Kaniewski	20,593	11.1	▼3.6	17,977	9.7	▼4.3
Greens	Stephan Kühn	15,839	8.6	▼1.2	16,588	9.0	▼0.6
FDP	Christoph Blödner	12,843	7.0	▲4.9	17,684	9.6	▲6.4
PARTEI	Steffen Retzlaff	4,997	2.7		3,850	2.1	
Tierschutzpartei					2,530	1.4	
FW	Astrid Beier	2,768	1.5	▼2.1	1,927	1.0	▼0.9
Pirates	Martin Schulte-Wissermann	2,697	1.5	▼3.1	1,501	0.8	▼3.6
ÖDP	Sebastian Andreas Högen	2,141	1.2		1,100	0.6	
NPD	Jens Baur	1,160	0.6	▼2.8	1,372	0.7	▼1.9
BGE					1,041	0.6	
DiB					758	0.4	
V-Partei³					404	0.2	
BüSo	Brigitta Gründler	499	0.3	▼0.2	219	0.1	▼0.1
MLPD	Günter Slave	372	0.2	▼0.1	255	0.1	0.0
Informal votes		2,125			1,654		
Total valid votes		184,693			185,164		
Turnout		186,818	79.3	▲5.7			
CDU hold	Majority	5,983	3.2	▼19.5			

=== 2013 election ===
Federal election (2013): Dresden II – Bautzen II
Notes:	Blue background denotes the winner of the electorate vote. Pink background denotes a candidate elected from their party list. Yellow background denotes an electorate win by a list member, or other incumbent. A ✓ or ✗ denotes status of any incumbent, win or lose respectively.						
Party	Candidate	Votes	%	±%	Party votes	%	±%
CDU	✓ Arnold Vaatz	71,227	41.8	▲5.4	66,092	38.6	▲4.8
Left	Tilo Kießling	32,588	19.1	▼0.4	31,059	18.1	▼2.1
SPD	Thomas Blümel	25,150	14.8	▲0.1	23,943	14.0	▼0.1
Greens	Stephan Kühn	16,650	9.8	▼2.6	16,304	9.5	▼3.6
AfD					11,930	7.0	
Pirates	Anna Katharina Vogelgesang	7,841	4.6		7,508	4.4	
FW	Steffen Grosse	6,216	3.6		3,250	1.9	
NPD	Jens Baur	5,849	3.4	▲0.6	4,590	2.7	▼0.3
FDP	Matteo Böhme	3,471	2.0	▼9.9	5,405	3.2	▼11.1
PRO					439	0.3	
BüSo	Marco Hebestadt	852	0.5	▼0.5	400	0.2	▼0.8
MLPD	Günter Paul Slave	554	0.3	0.0	273	0.2	▼0.1
Informal votes		3,091			2,296		
Total valid votes		170,398			171,193		
Turnout		173,489	73.6	▲6.7			
CDU hold	Majority	38,639	22.7	▲5.8			

=== 2009 election ===
Federal election (2009): Dresden II – Bautzen II
Notes:	Blue background denotes the winner of the electorate vote. Pink background denotes a candidate elected from their party list. Yellow background denotes an electorate win by a list member, or other incumbent. A ✓ or ✗ denotes status of any incumbent, win or lose respectively.						
Party	Candidate	Votes	%	±%	Party votes	%	±%
CDU	✓ Arnold Vaatz	55,401	36.4	▲2.2	51,621	33.8	▲5.0
Left	Klaus Sühl	29,679	19.5	▲0.3	30,870	20.2	▲0.4
SPD	Ines Vogel	22,268	14.6	▼10.9	21,518	14.1	▼10.4
Greens	Stephan Kühn	18,871	12.4	▲4.9	19,978	13.1	▲3.9
FDP	Jan Mücke	18,204	12.0	▲4.5	21,783	14.3	▼3.3
NPD	Jens Baur	4,389	2.9	▼1.4	4,501	2.9	▼1.1
BüSo	Toni Kästner	1,597	1.0	▼0.1	1,569	1.0	▲0.3
Independent	Lukas Welke	1,436	0.9				
MLPD	Günter Paul Slave	436	0.3	0.0	391	0.3	0.0
REP					366	0.2	0.0
Informal votes		2,328			2,012		
Total valid votes		152,281			152,597		
Turnout		154,609	66.9	▼10.5			
CDU hold	Majority	25,722	16.9	▲8.2			

=== 2005 election ===
Federal election (2005):Dresden II – Meißen I
Notes:	Blue background denotes the winner of the electorate vote. Pink background denotes a candidate elected from their party list. Yellow background denotes an electorate win by a list member, or other incumbent. A ✓ or ✗ denotes status of any incumbent, win or lose respectively.						
Party	Candidate	Votes	%	±%	Party votes	%	±%
CDU	✓ Arnold Vaatz	67,514	35.2	▼1.8	56,975	29.7	▼3.3
SPD	Michael Sturm	47,412	24.7	▼4.4	46,377	24.2	▼5.9
Left	Martina Sacher	36,007	18.8	▲1.3	37,306	19.4	▲3.8
FDP	Jan Mücke	14,443	7.5	▼0.3	21,221	11.1	▲2.9
Greens	Eva Jähnigen	14,294	7.5	▲1.4	17,244	9.0	▲0.2
NPD	Matthias Paul	8,299	4.3		7,832	4.1	▲3.0
BüSo	Ronald Galle	2,261	1.2	▲0.6	1,370	0.7	▲0.3
Alliance for Health, Peace and Social Justice					1,592	0.8	
DSU	Dietmar Klingenberg	903	0.5	▼0.3			
PBC					655	0.3	0.0
MLPD	Günter Slave	644	0.3		469	0.2	
REP					451	0.2	▼0.5
SGP					438	0.2	
Informal votes		2,988			2,835		
Total valid votes		191,777			191,930		
Turnout		194,765	77.9	▲3.3			
CDU hold	Majority	20,102	10.5				
