= Apel =

Apel or APEL may refer to:

== Places ==
- Apel, Limpopo, town in Sekhukhune District Municipality in the Limpopo province of South Africa
- Ter Apel, town in the municipality Vlagtwedde in the northern Netherlands

== Other uses ==
- Apel (surname)
- APEL or "Accreditation of Prior Experiential Learning", the formal recognition of prior learning by UK universities
- Apel (emacs), a portable Emacs library; see Emacs Lisp § Language features
- Apel-stones
- Apel Codex
- Authorized Protective Eyewear List
- Apel (film), a 1970 animated short film by Ryszard Czekała
- "Apel" (song), the anthem of the Sotsyalistishe Kinder Farband (S.K.I.F.)

== See also ==
- Abel (surname)
- Apple (disambiguation)
- Appel (disambiguation)
- Appell, a surname
- Apfel, a surname
