= Orla (Kleine Röder) =

River in Germany

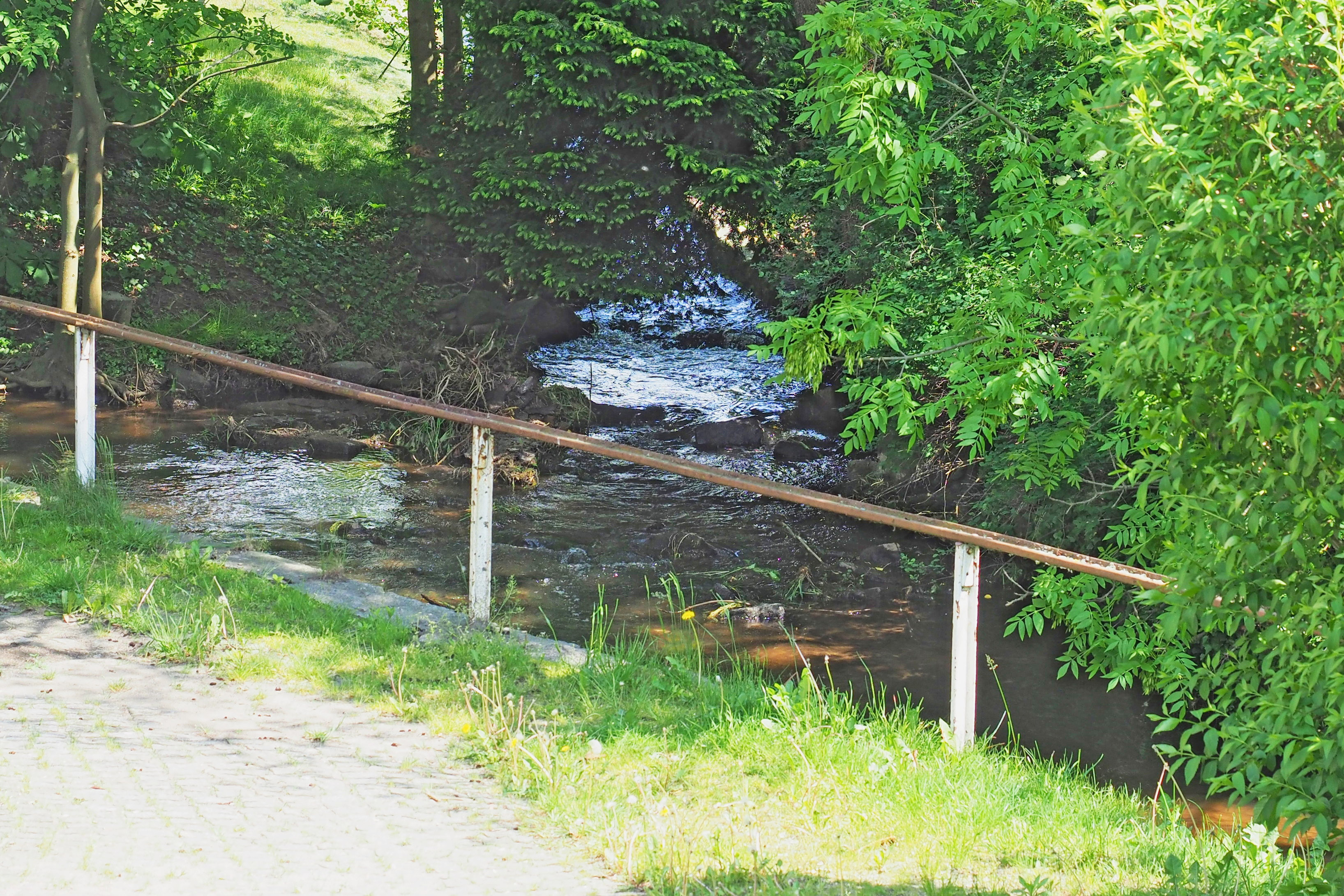

Location
- Country: Germany
- States: Saxony

Physical characteristics
- Mouth
  - location: Kleine Röder
  - coordinates: 51.1878°N 13.8331°E

Basin features
- Progression: Kleine Röder→ Große Röder→ Black Elster→ Elbe→ North Sea

The Orla is a small river of Saxony, Germany. It is a tributary of the Kleine Röder, which it joins in Ottendorf-Okrilla.

== Course ==
The Orla originates on the northern edge of the Landwehr in the area of Wachau at approximately 255 m above sea level. It is formed from two small source streams that feed the roughly 1-hectare Landwehrteich, from which the river flows northwards towards Wachau. The river meets the Kleine Röder in the Unterdorf area of Ottendorf‑Okrilla at about 175 m above sea level.

The Orla is dammed at several points, especially within the village of Wachau, creating ponds including the castle’s moat and the Wachauer Schlossteich (church pond).

Other ponds along or near the river include the Landwehrteich, Dorfteich Wachau, Fünfhufenteich, and the Sandteich.

== Human use ==
As a fishing water, the Orla is managed by the Anglerverband Elbflorenz Dresden under waterbody number “D 07‑08” for a stretch of 5 km from Wachau to its confluence with the Kleine Röder.

It is known for trout (forellen) fishing.

== See also ==
- List of rivers of Saxony
