= Jürgen Werth =

German journalist and author

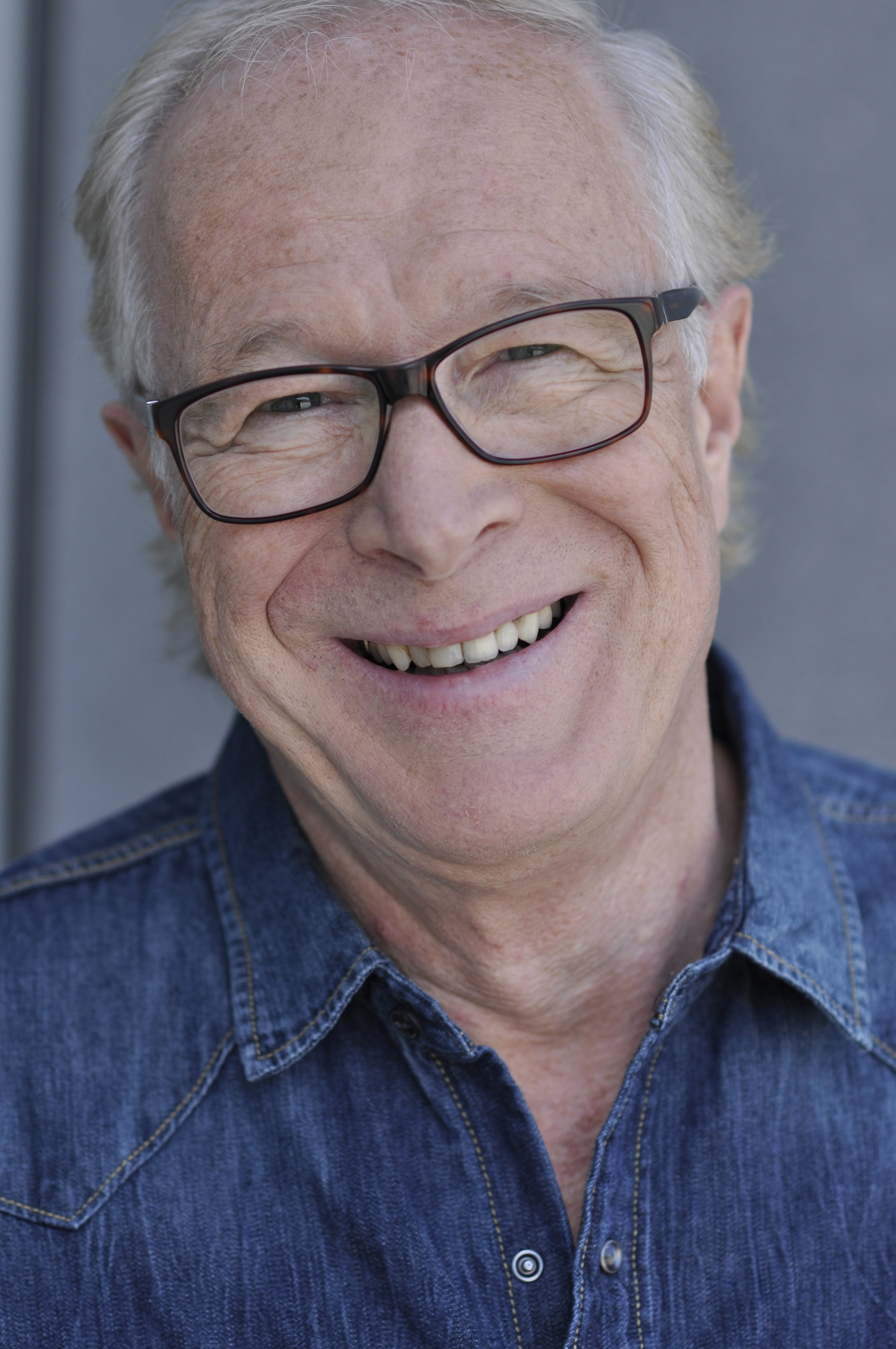
Werth in 2016

Jürgen Werth (14 May 1951) is a German journalist, author and singer-songwriter. He was director of Evangeliums-Rundfunks from 1994 to 2014, later named ERF Medien.

== Life and career ==
Werth was born in Lüdenscheid on 14 May 1951. He began to write songs at age 14. He trained as a journalist at the Westfälische Rundschau in Hagen, Lüdenscheid and Dortmund. He worked for the Evangeliums-Rundfunk (now ERF Medien) in Wetzlar from 1973. From 1977 to 1984 he directed their youth program named e.r.f. junge welle. He became chief editor in 1986 and director in 1994, succeeding Horst Marquardt. Werth presented a talk show Wert(h)e Gäste 246 times until June 2014. and more than 50 times the Wartburg-Gespräche. He was speaker of the ARD series Das Wort zum Sonntag for three years. He was succeeded by Jörg Dechert in 2014.

Werth published many books and has worked as singer-songwriter. Among his popular songs are "Du bist du" ("Vergiss es nie") with a melody by Paul Janz and "Wie ein Fest nach langer Trauer" with a melody by Johannes Nitsch. He wrote texts for several Christian musicals, such as the Luther musical Bruder Martinus with music by Siegfried Fietz

=== Personal life ===
Werth is married; he and his wife Angela have three children. He lives as a freelance writer in Wetzlar.

== Awards ==
- 1999: Media prize (Goldener Kompass] by KEP.
