= Battle of Leipzig =

1813 battle of the Napoleonic Wars

- Part of the German campaign of the Sixth Coalition
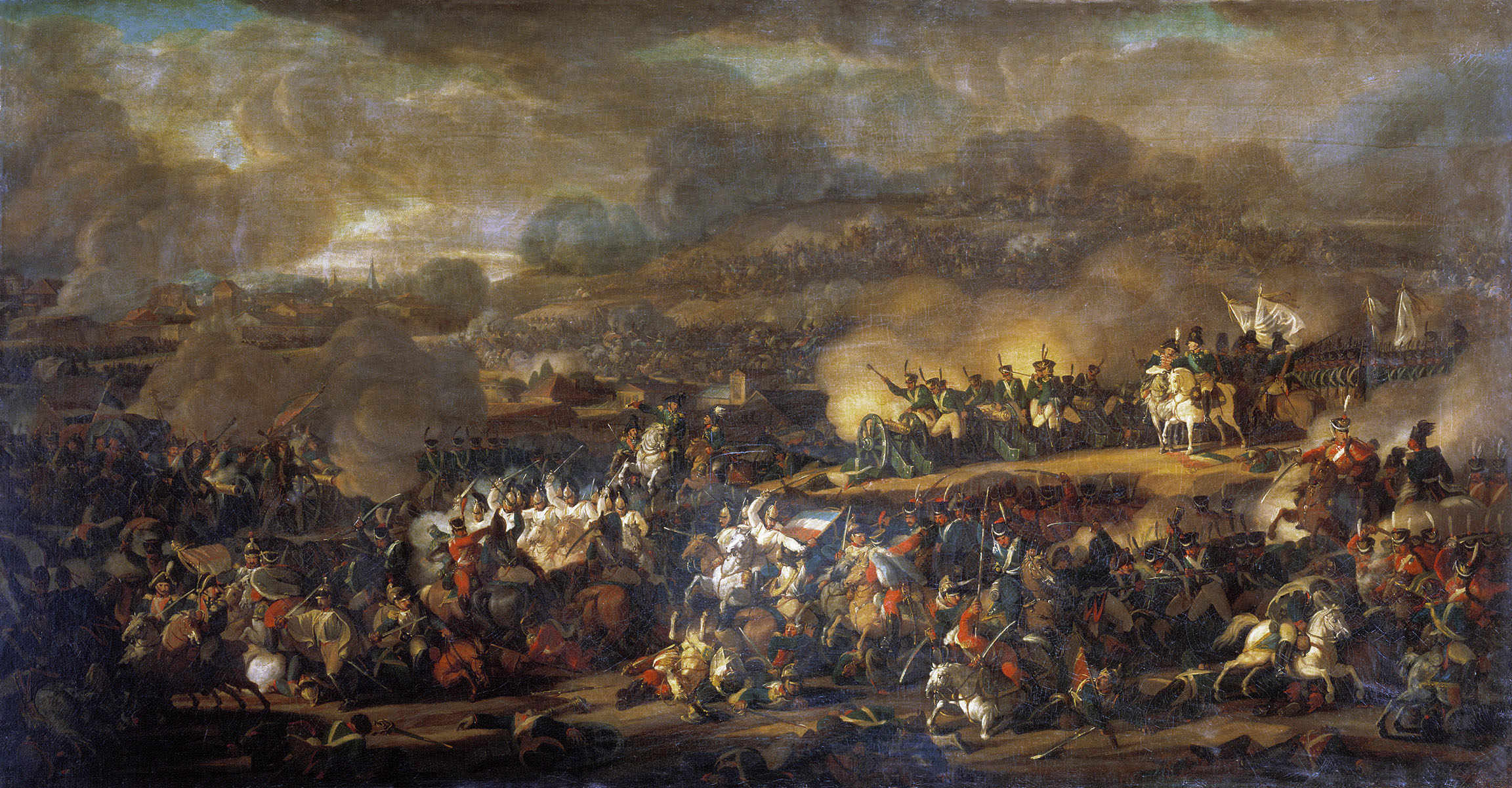
- 1815 painting of the battle
Date	16–19 October 1813
Location	Leipzig, Kingdom of Saxony 51°18′44″N 12°24′48″E
Result	Coalition victory
Territorial changes	Dissolution of the Rhine Confederation: France loses complete control of all territories east of the Rhine

Belligerents
Russia; Austria; Prussia; Sweden; (Grand Duchy of Mecklenburg-Schwerin) Mecklenburg-Schwerin; (Kingdom of Saxony) Saxon army (Note: The Saxon army and Württemberg defected to the allies on 18 October) (from 18 October); Württemberg (from 18 October); United Kingdom (Note: 200 of the Rocket Brigade)	France: (Grand Duchy of Baden) Baden; Duchy of Warsaw; Italy; (Kingdom of Westphalia) Westphalia; (Kingdom of Naples) Naples; Saxony (Note: the Saxon government remained loyal to Napoleon while its army defected on 18 October); Württemberg (until 18 October); Hesse

Commanders and leaders
(Austrian Empire) Karl von Schwarzenberg (Note: Commander-in-chief (in Germany); commander of the Army of Bohemia); (Austrian Empire) Francis I; (Russian Empire) Alexander I (Note: Supreme commander-in-chief (of the entire eastern front)); (Russian Empire) Levin von Bennigsen (Note: Commander of the Army of Poland); (Kingdom of Prussia) Frederick William III; (Kingdom of Prussia) Gebhard Leberecht von Blücher (Note: Commander of the Army of Silesia); (Sweden) Charles John (Note: Commander of the Army of the North)	(First French Empire) Napoleon Bonaparte (Note: Commander of the entire Grande Armée); (First French Empire) Jacques MacDonald; (First French Empire) Auguste de Marmont; (First French Empire) Michel Ney (Note: Commander of the Northern Sector); (First French Empire) Nicolas Oudinot; (First French Empire) Jean Reynier; Józef Poniatowski †; Joachim Murat (Note: Commander of the Southern Sector)

Units involved
See list:^{Based on:} Army of Silesia: (Kingdom of Prussia) I Corps; (Russian Empire) XI Corps; (Russian Empire) IV Cavalry Corps; Corps-Group Langeron; (Russian Empire) VIII Corps; (Russian Empire) IX Corps; (Russian Empire) X Corps; (Russian Empire) I Cavalry Corps; Army of the North: (Kingdom of Prussia) III Corps; (Russian Empire) Wintzingerode Corps; (Sweden) Swedish Army; (United Kingdom of Great Britain and Ireland) Rocket Brigade; Army of Bohemia: (Austrian Empire) Austrian Advance Guard; (Austrian Empire) II Corps; (Austrian Empire) III Corps; (Austrian Empire) Reserve Corps; (Austrian Empire) Cuirassier Corps; Russo-Prussian Reserve (GD. Konstantin); (Russian Empire) III Grenadier Corps; (Russian Empire) (Kingdom of Prussia) V Guard Corps; (Russian Empire) Guard Cavalry Corps; Southern Wing (Gen. of the Inf. Barclay de Tolly); (Austrian Empire) I Corps; (Austrian Empire) IV Corps; (Russian Empire) Platov Cossack Corps; Corps-Group Wittgenstein; (Kingdom of Prussia) II Corps; (Russian Empire) I Corps; (Russian Empire) II Corps; (Russian Empire) Pahlen Cavalry Corps; Army of Poland: (Russian Empire) Dokhturov Corps	See list:^{Based on:} Northern Sector: III Corps; (Kingdom of Italy (Napoleonic)) (Kingdom of Württemberg) (Kingdom of Westphalia) IV Corps; (Kingdom of Württemberg) VI Corps; (Poland) 27th Infantry Division (VIII Corps); III Cavalry Corps; Lindenau Leipzig Sector: (Kingdom of Saxony) VII Corps; V Cavalry Corps; Detached Cavalry Brigade (III Cavalry Corps); Leipzig Garrison; Eastern Sector: (Kingdom of Westphalia) (Kingdom of Naples) (Grand Duchy of Hesse) (Kingdom of Italy (Napoleonic)) (Grand Duchy of Baden) XI Corps; II Cavalry Corps; Southern Sector: Imperial Guard; II Corps; V Corps; (Poland) VIII Corps; IX Corps; (Poland) (Kingdom of Italy (Napoleonic)) (Kingdom of Saxony) I Cavalry Corps; (Poland) IV Cavalry Corps

Strength
16–17 October: 257,000; 1,145 guns (Note: The Army of the North and the Army of Poland, which were not on the battlefield, are subtracted.); 18–19 October: 359,000; 1,500 guns Total in service: (Russian Empire) 150,000; (Austrian Empire) 115,000; (Kingdom of Prussia) 90,000; (Sweden) 30,000; (Grand Duchy of Mecklenburg-Schwerin) 6,149	16–17 October: 177,000; 700 guns 18–19 October: 195,000; 900 guns Total in service: (First French Empire) 160,000; 10,000; (Kingdom of Italy (Napoleonic)) 9,000; (Kingdom of Saxony) 6,000; (Grand Duchy of Baden) 5,000; (Kingdom of Württemberg) 3,500; (Grand Duchy of Hesse) 2,500; (Kingdom of Westphalia) 2,000

Casualties and losses
54,000–80,000 (Note: 54,000; 76,000; 80,000); Official allied estimates (=53,804): (Russian Empire) 22,605; (Kingdom of Prussia) 16,033; (Austrian Empire) 14,958; (Sweden) 208; 29 generals and 1,896 officers	60,000–79,000: (Note: 60,000; 74,000; 79,000): 38,000 killed and wounded; 30,000–36,000 captured (15,000 wounded); 5,000–6,000 Saxons defected; Unknown number of missing; 325 guns 66 generals and 2,414 officers

War of the Sixth Coalition:
German campaign
current battle
Napoleon in command
Napoleon not in command

The Battle of Leipzig, (Note: Contemporary spelling: Leipsic; French: Bataille de Leipsick; Swedish: Slaget vid Leipzig; Russian: Битва под Лейпцигом, romanized: Bitva pod Leyptsigom) also known as the Battle of the Nations, (Note: French: Bataille des Nations; Russian: Битва народов, romanized: Bitva narodov; German: Völkerschlacht bei Leipzig, lit. 'Battle of the Nations near Leipzig', IPA: [ˈfœlkɐˌʃlaxt baɪ ˈlaɪptsɪç]) was fought from 16 to 19 October 1813 at Leipzig, Saxony. The Coalition armies of Austria, Prussia, Sweden, and Russia, led by Tsar Alexander I, Karl von Schwarzenberg, Gebhard von Blücher and Swedish Crown Prince Charles John, decisively defeated the Grande Armée of French Emperor Napoleon Bonaparte. Napoleon's army also contained Polish and Italian troops, as well as Germans from the Confederation of the Rhine (mainly Saxony and Württemberg). The battle was the culmination of the German campaign of 1813 and involved about 560,000 soldiers, 2,200 artillery pieces, the expenditure of 400,000 rounds of artillery ammunition, and 133,000 casualties. This made it the largest of the battles during the Napoleonic Wars and, arguably, the deciding battle of the wars.

Decisively defeated, Napoleon was compelled to return to France while the Sixth Coalition kept up its momentum, dissolving the Confederation of the Rhine and invading France early the next year. Napoleon was forced to abdicate and was exiled to Elba in May 1814.

== Background ==
The French Emperor Napoleon I attempted to force Emperor Alexander I of Russia into rejoining his unpopular Continental System by invading Russia on 24 June 1812 with around 685,000 troops, and eventually entered Moscow in late 1812, following the bloody, yet indecisive Battle of Borodino. However, Alexander refused to surrender even as the French occupied the city, which was set on fire by the time of its occupation. The campaign ended in complete disaster as Napoleon and his remaining forces retreated during the bitter Russian winter, with sickness, starvation, and the constant harrying by Russian Cossacks and partisans, leaving the Grande Armée virtually destroyed by the time it returned from Russia. To make matters even worse for Napoleon, in June 1813, the combined armies of Portugal, Spain, and the United Kingdom, under the command of the Duke of Wellington, had decisively routed the French at the Battle of Vitoria in the Peninsular War, and were now advancing towards the Pyrenees and into France itself. With this string of defeats, the French armies were in retreat on all fronts across Europe.

Anti-French forces joined Russia as its troops pursued the remnants of the virtually destroyed Grande Armée across Central Europe. The allies regrouped as the Sixth Coalition, comprising Prussia, Russia, Spain, Portugal, Sweden, the United Kingdom, as well as smaller German states whose citizens and leaders were no longer loyal to the French emperor. Napoleon hurried back to France and managed to mobilize another large army, but severe economic hardship and news of defeats had led to war-weariness and growing unrest among France's population.

Despite disastrous campaigns in Spain and Russia in 1812, France was still able to rebuild another massive army for Napoleon. Though this new army was large in numbers, it was mostly made up of raw and young French conscripts, many of whom had no desire to fight in Napoleon's wars. Yet Napoleon, with this new massive army, had the intention of either inducing a temporary alliance or at least cessation of hostilities, or knocking at least one of the Great Powers (Prussia or Russia) out of the war and keeping Austria neutral. Napoleon sought to regain the offensive by re-establishing his hold in Germany, winning two hard-fought tactical victories, at Lützen on 2 May and Bautzen on 20–21 May.

These victories led to a brief armistice. During the armistice, the monarchs of Russia and Prussia met Crown Prince Charles John of Sweden at Trachenberg Castle in Silesia. Charles John, a former French Marshal of the Empire (previously known as Jean-Baptiste Bernadotte), outlined a strategy for defeating Napoleon that, with added details from the Austrians following their joining of the Coalition on 12 August 1813, became known as the Trachenberg Plan. In accordance with the Trachenberg Plan, three Coalition armies were formed, the Army of Silesia of 95,000 men under the command of Gebhard von Blücher, the Army of North Germany of 120,000 (including Swedish garrisons in Stralsund) under Crown Prince Charles John, and the Army of Bohemia, the primary allied army in the field with 225,000 men, under the command of Karl Philipp, Prince of Schwarzenberg. A fourth army was constituted as the Army of Poland, initially 30,000 men, but expanding to 70,000 by year's end, under the command of Count Benningsen. As outlined by the Trachenberg Plan, the Coalition armies would avoid battle with Napoleon, retreat whenever Napoleon himself advanced, and instead target the forces under the command of his marshals. Despite the injunction to avoid battle with the Emperor, the Army of Bohemia engaged Napoleon at the Battle of Dresden on 27 August where the French won a crushing victory.

However, close adherence to the Trachenberg Plan led to Coalition victories at Großbeeren, Kulm, Katzbach, and Dennewitz. Meanwhile, Charles John had begun a concerted propaganda campaign in Germany, drawing on his experience as Minister of War during the French Revolution, to stoke German nationalist feeling and calling on the kings of Bavaria and Saxony, whose armies he had commanded in 1805 and 1809, to repudiate their French alliances. His efforts met with success as the Saxon and Westphalian armies had begun exhibiting signs of mutiny throughout late August and September, with Saxon units defecting to the Coalition at Großbeeren and Dennewitz and Westphalian troops deserting in increasing numbers. Additionally, in early September the Bavarians proclaimed neutrality following Charles John's victory over Ney at Dennewitz. After these defeats and defections the French emperor could not capitalize on his victory at Dresden. Thinly-stretched supply lines spanning into now somewhat hostile territory, coupled with Bavaria's switching of sides against the French just eight days prior to Leipzig, made it almost impossible to replace his army's losses of 150,000 men, 300 guns, and 50,000 sick.

== Prelude ==
With the intention of knocking Prussia out of the war as soon as possible, Napoleon sent Marshal Nicolas Oudinot to take the Prussian capital of Berlin with an army of 60,000. Oudinot was defeated at the Battle of Großbeeren, by the Swedes and Prussians of the Army of the North, just south of the city. Another attempt was made at Berlin on 6 September 1813, this time with Ney in command of 58,000 troops. However, Ney's command disintegrated following a catastrophic defeat at the hands of von Bülow and Charles John at the Battle of Dennewitz. With an intact Army of the North threatening from the direction of Berlin, and Blücher's army moving toward the Elbe, Napoleon was compelled to withdraw westward. He crossed the Elbe with much of his army between late September and early October, and organized his forces around Leipzig, to protect his crucial supply lines and oppose the converging Coalition armies arrayed against him. He deployed his army around the city, but concentrated his force from Taucha through Stötteritz, where he placed his command. The Prussians advanced from Wartenburg, the Austrians and Russians from Dresden (which they had recently retaken, after the Battle of Kulm), and the Swedes from the north.

== Opposing forces ==
The French had around 160,000 soldiers along with 700 guns plus 10,000 Poles, 9,000 Italians, and 19,000 Germans belonging to the Confederation of the Rhine, totalling 198,000 troops. In accordance with other estimates, their combined forces were up to 225,000 whilst the total number of guns brought in for all four days was 900. The Coalition had around 380,000 troops along with 1,500 guns, consisting of 145,000–150,000 Russians, 115,000 Austrians, 75,000–90,000 Prussians, and from 19,000 to 23,000–30,000 Swedes. This made Leipzig the largest battle of the Napoleonic wars, surpassing Borodino, Wagram, Jena and Auerstedt, Ulm, and Dresden.

The Grande Armée, under the command of Napoleon, was in a weakened state. The majority of his troops now consisted of teenagers and inexperienced men conscripted shortly after the near destruction of the Grande Armée in Russia. Napoleon conscripted these men to be readied for an even larger campaign against the newly formed Sixth Coalition and its forces stationed in Germany. While he won several preliminary battles, his army was being steadily depleted as the Allies, closely following the Trachenberg Plan, systematically defeated his marshals with weaker corps, while exhausting Napoleon's corps with chases across Germany. The French Imperial cavalry was similarly insufficient, making it difficult for Napoleon to keep his eyes on his lines of communications or even scout enemy positions, a fact which influenced the outcome of the Battle of Großbeeren and others during the German campaign.

The Coalition army was organized into four army-level commands: the Army of Bohemia under Karl von Schwarzenberg, the Army of Silesia under Blücher, the Army of Poland under Levin August von Bennigsen and the combined Prussian, Russian, and Swedish Army of the North under Crown Prince Charles XIV John. The Swedes also had under their command a company of the British Rocket Brigade armed with Congreve rockets, led by Captain Richard Bogue. (Note: Charles John had asked for a British garrison for Stralsund so as to liberate more Swedish troops for service in Germany. He was sent six battalions under Major-General Gibbs, plus the Rocket Brigade. Only the 2/73rd took to the field under General Wallmoden and were present at the Battle of the Gohrde.)

== Preparations ==
=== French plans ===
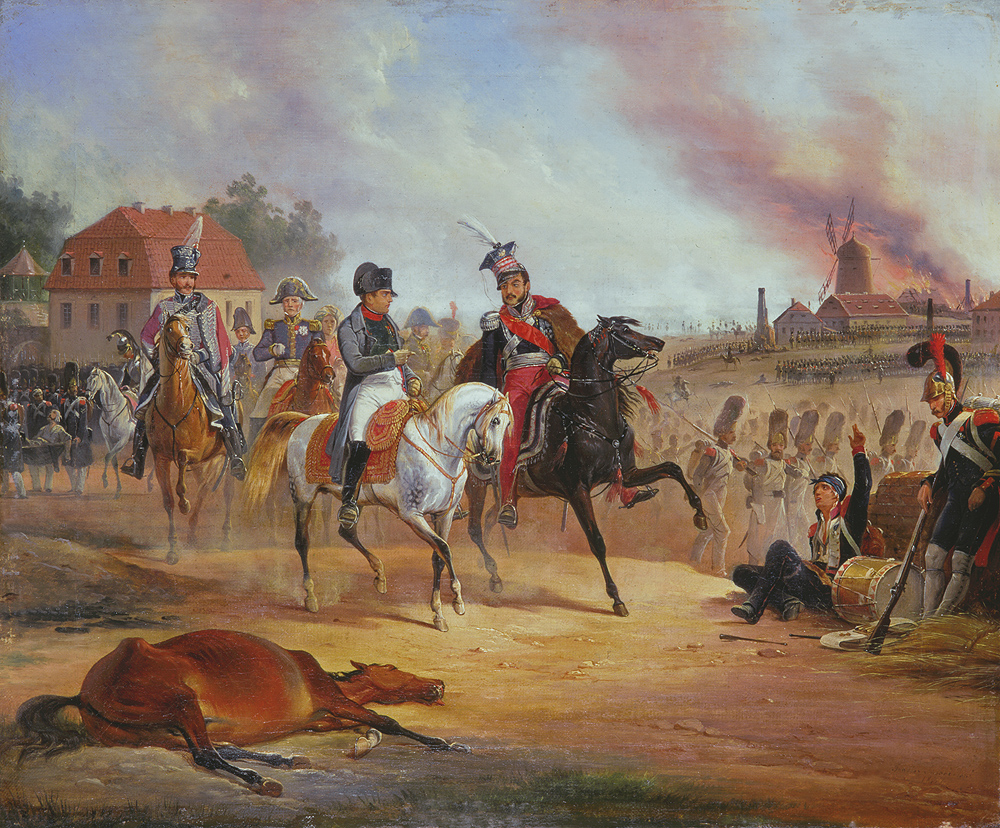
Napoleon and Poniatowski at Leipzig, by January Suchodolski

Despite being outnumbered, Napoleon planned to take the offensive between the Pleiße and the Parthe rivers. The position at Leipzig held several advantages for his army and his battle strategy. The rivers that converged there split the surrounding terrain into four separate sectors. Holding Leipzig and its bridges, Napoleon could shift troops from one sector to another far more rapidly than the Allies could, who had difficulty moving such large numbers of troops into a single sector.

The northern front was defended by Marshals Michel Ney and Auguste de Marmont, and the eastern front by Marshal Jacques MacDonald. The artillery reserve and parks, ambulances, and baggage stood near Leipzig, which Napoleon made his supply base for the battle. The bridges on the Pleisse and White Elster rivers were defended by infantry and a few guns. The main battery stood in reserve, and during battle was to be deployed on the Gallows Height. This battery was to be commanded by the artillery expert Antoine Drouot. The western flank of the French positions at Wachau and Liebertwolkwitz was defended by Prince Józef Poniatowski and Marshal Pierre Augereau and his young French conscripts.

=== Coalition plans ===
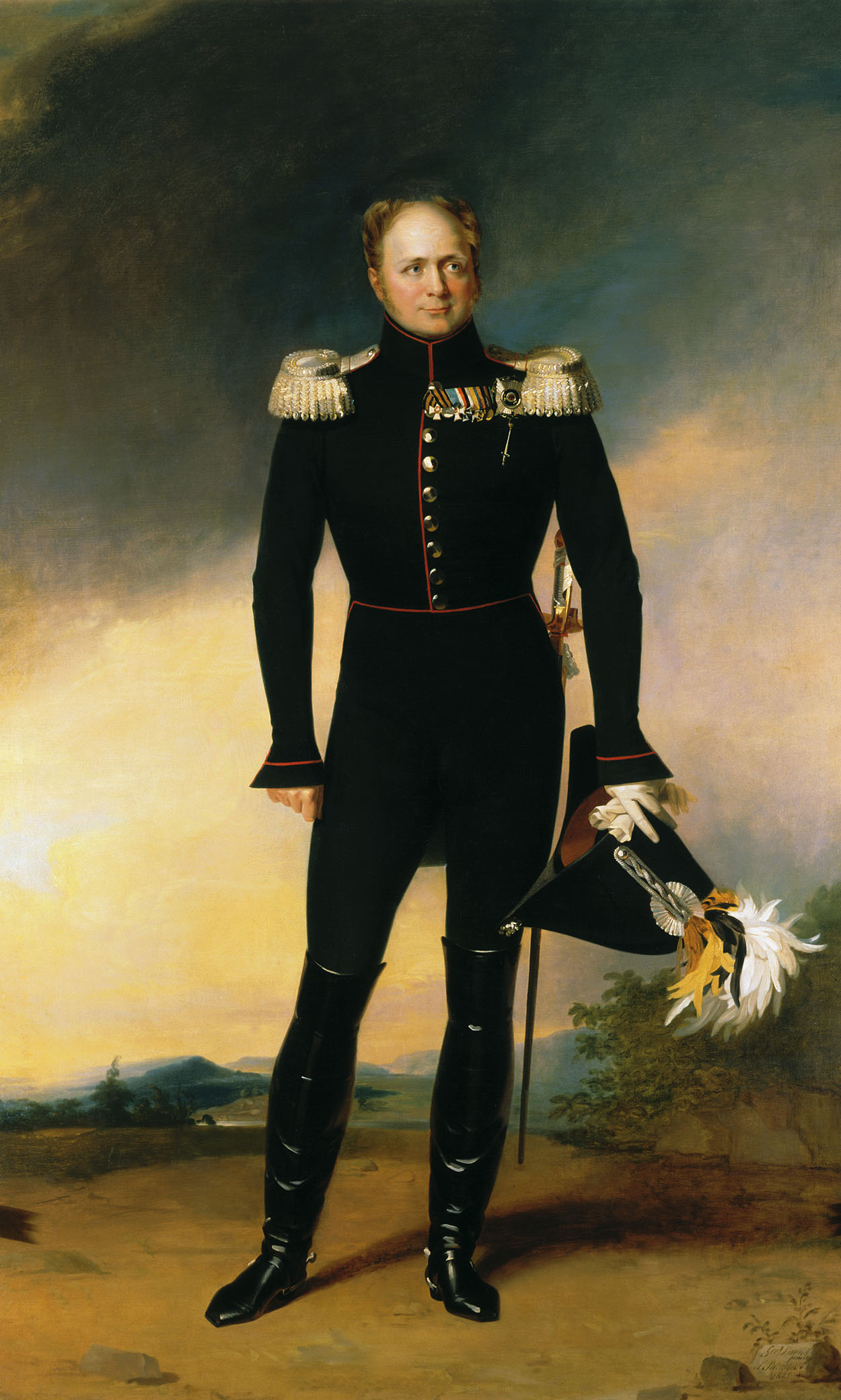
Alexander I, Emperor of Russia and supreme commander of the Coalition armies

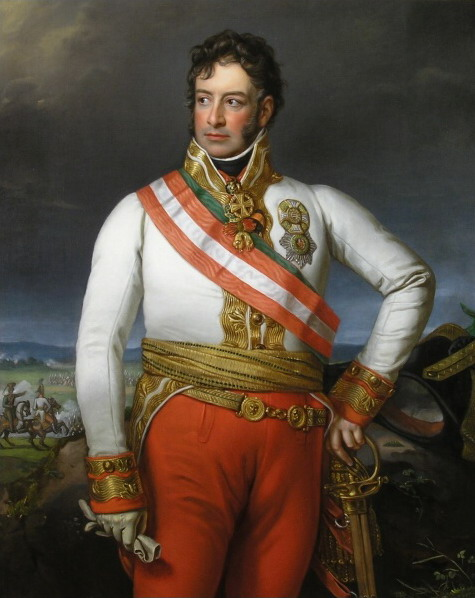
Karl von Schwarzenberg of Austria, commander-in-chief of the Coalition armies

The three monarchs of the Coalition powers were present in the field, with Emperor Alexander I of Russia at the head of the three alongside King Frederick William III of Prussia and Emperor Francis I of Austria. The Swedish regent and crown prince Charles John was also present. Alexander was the supreme commander of the Coalition forces in the eastern front of the war, while Prince Karl von Schwarzenberg of Austria was the commander-in-chief of all Coalition forces in the German theatre.

There was a drafting of the battle plan, with Marshals Prince Volkonsky of Russia, Johan Christopher Toll of Sweden and Karl Friedrich von dem Knesebeck of Prussia taking part in the planning. After the first plan was drafted, Schwarzenberg submitted it to the monarchs. However, Alexander complained about his incompetence in terms of battle planning upon seeing the plan for himself. Upon learning of Schwarzenberg's main plan – to call for a secondary attack on the bridge between Leipzig and Lindenau to be led by Blücher and Gyulay, and a main attack astride the Pleiße River to be led by General Merveldt, Hessen-Homburg and the Prussian Guard, he insisted that this was a disastrous tactic as it would not permit the Coalition armies to outflank and encircle Napoleon's army and destroy it. Alexander thought the plan would potentially allow Napoleon to break the Coalition battle line at one point and then concentrate his forces in the gap created and the weakened sectors. This would possibly give Napoleon a chance to regain the strategic initiative in Germany. Frederick William III attempted to opine to Alexander but could do nothing so he treated the discussion as if it was none of his concern. Later events in the battle proved the Russian emperor's judgments correct. The action he had ordered Blücher to take met with great success north of Leipzig and the actions of the Russian Guard were decisive in halting the all-out French attack on Gulden Gossa in the south. On the other hand, the actions of the Austrians along the Pleiße River, part of Schwarzenberg's initial plan, ended in failure.

However, not willing to plan the battle by himself as he had done during his disastrous defeat at Austerlitz almost a decade earlier, Alexander had Schwarzenberg draft another battle plan based on his thoughts and views. Schwarzenberg then drafted another plan that was largely designed to let everyone do as they pleased. The plan was as follows: Blücher's axis of advance was to be shifted northward to the Halle road, the Russian and Prussian guards and the Russian heavy cavalry was to be amassed at Rotha in general reserve. The Austrian grenadiers and cuirassiers would advance between the rivers. This strategy would ensure the encirclement of the French army in Leipzig and its vicinity, or at least inflict heavy losses upon them to assure the needed decisive results. Seemingly, though somewhat reluctantly, convinced, Alexander soon agreed to his plan, and he then ordered him to tell the other commanders to follow the plan.

== Battle ==
=== 16 October ===
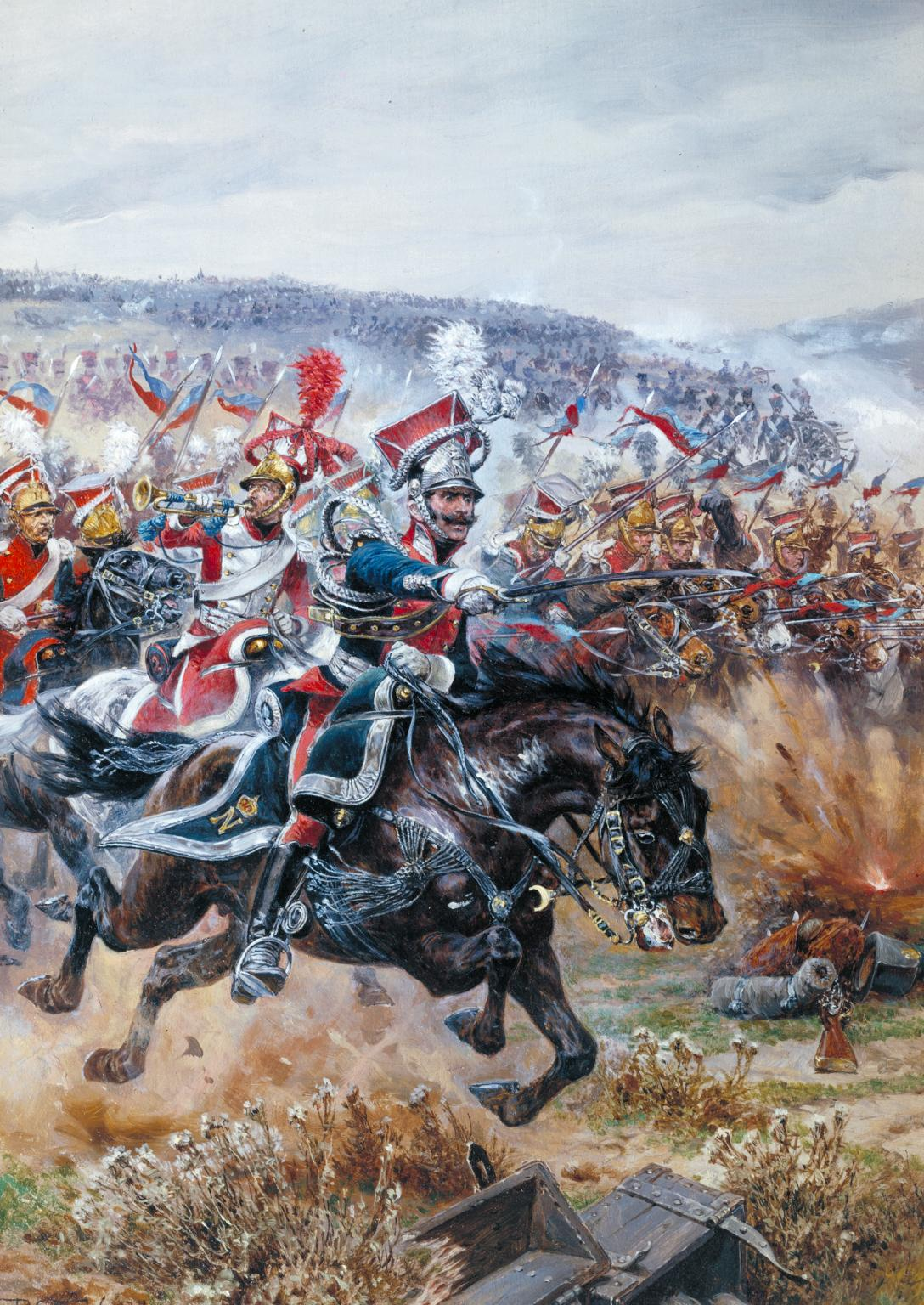
Poniatowski's Last Charge at Leipzig (Richard Caton Woodville Jr., 1912)

The French had gained slight victories at Lindenau and Wachau, and sustained a reverse at Möckern. The Allies had lost approximately 30,000 men, including 2,000 prisoners, the French about 25,000 in all. Despite the French advantage in terms of casualties, the first day ended in a draw. Moreover, the odds seemed to be shifting in the Allies' favor, for while Napoleon could only anticipate the arrival of Jean Reynier's 14,000 men to raise his strength to barely 200,000 troops and 900 cannon, the Allies were awaiting the appearance of Charles John's 70,000 men and a similar number under Bennigsen, and these reinforcements would bring their total strength to over 300,000 and 1,500 guns.

Looking back on the first day's fighting, both sides made mistakes. Napoleon had underestimated Allied aggressiveness and miscalculated the position of Blücher and the Army of Silesia, and his men had suffered a sharp repulse at Möckern as a consequence. As for the Allies, the chaotic nature of their initial attack at Wachau, coupled with the flanking of waiting French forces, nearly led to catastrophe.

==== Action at Dölitz ====
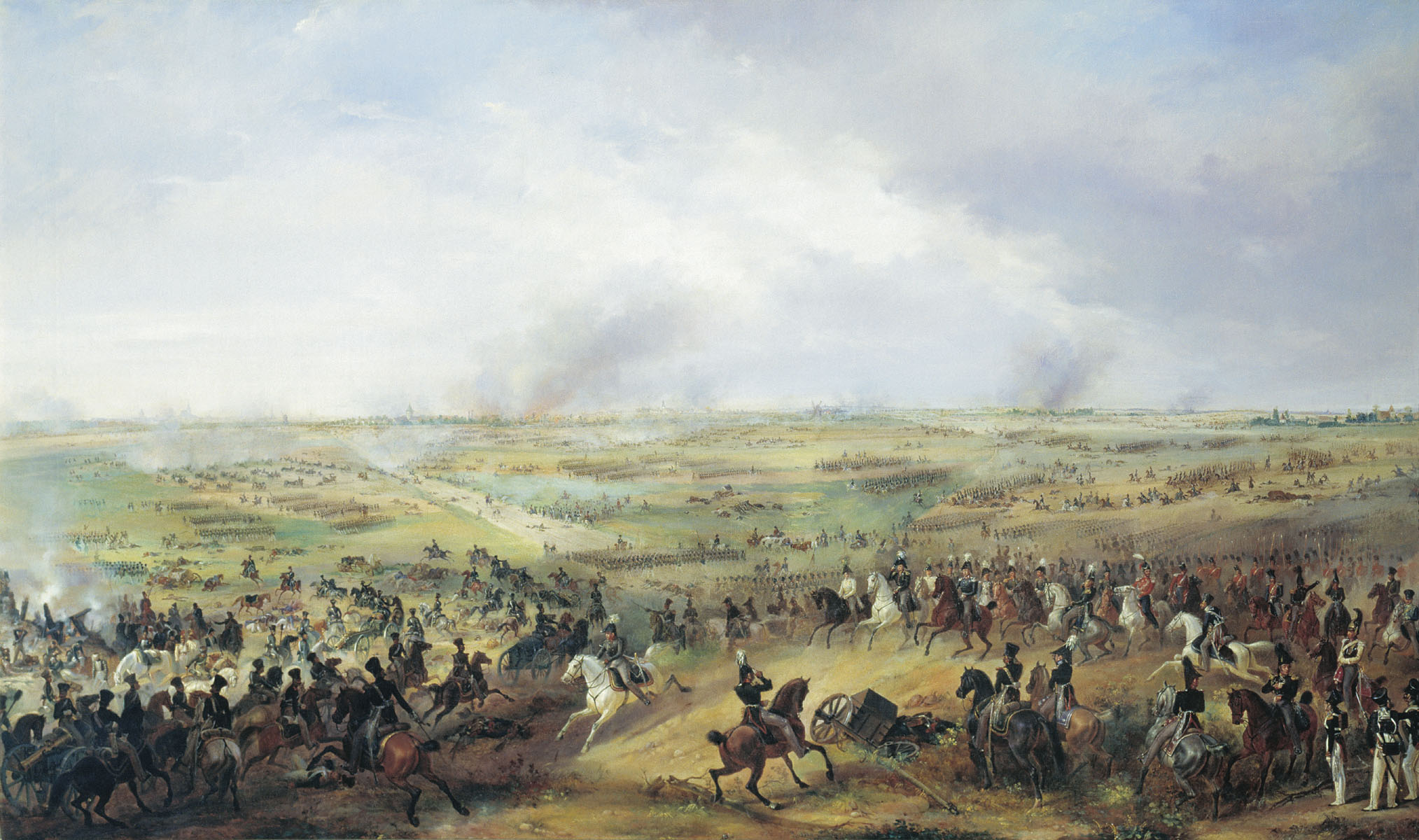
Overview of the battlefield

The Austrian II Corps, commanded by Merveldt, advanced towards Connewitz via Gautzsch and attempted to attack the position. By the time Napoleon arrived on the battlefield along with the Young Guard and some Chasseurs, Merveldt found that the avenue of advance was well covered by the French battery and some skirmishers who had occupied the houses there and did not permit the Austrians to deploy their artillery in support of the attack. Merveldt himself in an unlucky turn was wounded and captured by the French after he went straight into the Saxon-Polish lines at the Pleiße River. Repulsed, the Austrians then moved to attack nearby Dölitz, down a road crossed by two bridges and leading to a manor house and a mill. Two companies of the 24th Regiment ousted the small Polish garrison and took the position. A prompt counterattack by the Saxons and Poles ejected the Austrian troops and the battle seesawed until the Austrians brought up a strong artillery battery and blew the Poles out of the position. The Poles suffered heavy casualties during their furious defense and set fire to both the manor and the mill during their retreat.

==== Action at Markkleeberg ====
Actions as of 16 October

General Kleist, moving along the Pleiße, attacked Poniatowski and Marshal Augereau in the village of Markkleeberg. The Austrians repaired a bridge and took a school building and manor. The French counterattacked, throwing the Austrians out of the school and back over the river. French attacks on the manor only resulted in mounting casualties for the French and Poles. The Russian 14th Division began a series of flanking attacks that forced the Poles out of Markkleeberg. Poniatowski stopped the retreat and the advancing Russians. Catching four battalions of the Prussian 12th Brigade in the open, Poniatowski directed attacks by artillery and cavalry until they were relieved by Russian hussars. Poniatowski retook Markkleeberg, but was thrown out by two Prussian battalions. Austrian grenadiers then formed in front of Markkleeberg and drove the Poles and French out of the area with a flank attack.

==== Action at Wachau ====
The Russian II Corps attacked Wachau near Leipzig with support from the Prussian 9th Brigade. The Russians advanced, unaware that French forces were waiting. The French took them by surprise on the flank, mauling them. The Prussians entered Wachau, engaging in street-to-street fighting. French artillery blasted the Prussians out of Wachau and the French recovered the village.

==== Action at Liebertwolkwitz ====
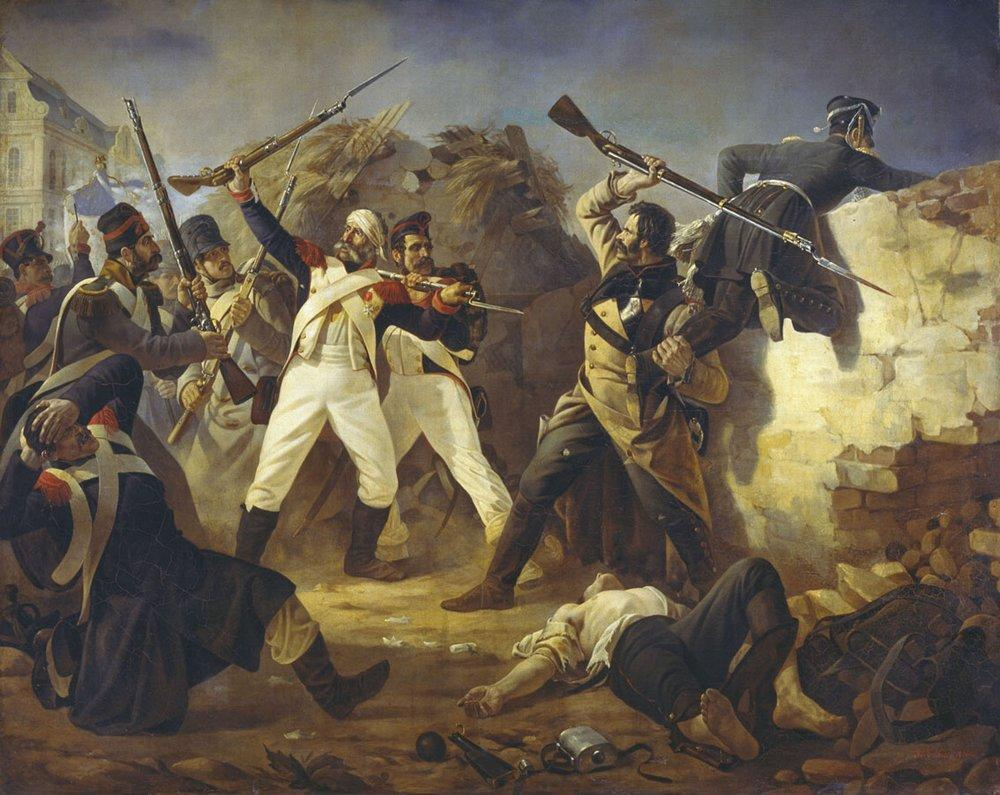
French soldiers sparing the life of Russian soldier Leontiy Korennoy for his bravery

Liebertwolkwitz was a large village in a commanding position, defended by Marshal MacDonald and General Lauriston with about 18,000 men. General von Klenau's Austrian IV Corps attacked with 24,500 men backed up by Pirch's 10th Brigade (4,550) and Zieten's 11th Brigade (5,365). The Austrians attacked first, driving the French out of Liebertwolkwitz after hard fighting, only to be driven out in turn by a French counterattack. Russo-Prussian General Württemberg was notable for his extreme bravery directing his troops under fire. At this point, Napoleon ordered General Drouot to form a grand battery of 150 guns on Gallows hill. This was done and the guns blasted the exposed Russian II Corps, forcing the Prussian battalions supporting it to take cover.

The hole had now been opened as Napoleon wished and at this point, Marshal Murat was unleashed with 10,000 French, Italian, and Saxon cavalry. However, Murat's choice of massive columns for the attack formation was unfortunate for the French force, as smaller mobile formations of Russian, Prussian, and Austrian cavalry were able to successfully harass Murat's division, driving them back to their own artillery, where they were saved by the French Guard Dragoons. The Young Guard was sent in to drive out the allies and give Napoleon his breakthrough. They recaptured both Liebertwolkwitz and Wachau, but the allies countered with Russian Guard and Austrian grenadiers backed by Russian cuirassiers. The units lived up to their elite reputation, forming squares that blasted the French cavalrymen from their horses and overran the French artillery batteries. On the southern front, although Napoleon gained ground, he could not break the Allied lines.

==== Northern attack ====
The northern front opened with the attack by General Langeron's Russian corps on the villages of Groß-Wiederitzsch and Klein-Wiederitzsch in the centre of the French northern lines. This position was defended by General Dąbrowski's Polish division of four infantry battalions and two cavalry battalions. At first sign of the attack, the Polish division attacked. The battle wavered back and forth with attacks and counterattacks. General Langeron rallied his forces and finally took both villages with heavy casualties.

==== Action at Möckern ====
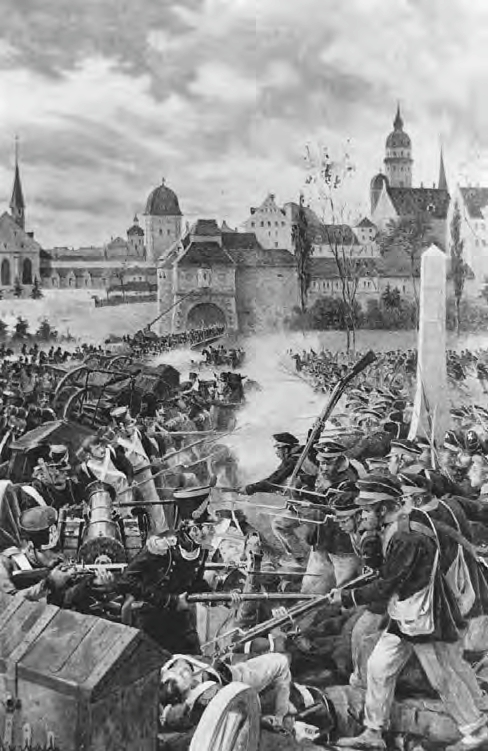
French infantry defending a barricade against a Prussian assault

The northern front was dominated by the Battle of Möckern. This was a four phase battle and saw hard fighting from both sides. A manor, palace, walled gardens, and low walls dominated the village. Each position was turned into a fortress with the walls being loopholed for covered fire by the French. The ground to the west of the position was too wooded and swampy for emplacement of artillery. A dike ran east along the Elster River being four metres high. Marshal Marmont brought up infantry columns behind the positions in reserve and for a quick counter-attack against any fallen position. Blücher commanded Langeron's Russian and Yorck's Prussian corps against Marmont's VI Corps. When the battle hung in the balance, Marmont ordered a cavalry charge, but his commander refused to attack. Later, an attack by Prussian hussars caused serious losses to the French defenders. The battle lasted well into the night. Artillery caused the majority of the 9,000 Allied and 7,000 French casualties, and the French lost another 2,000 prisoners.

==== Action at Lindenau ====
In the western front, the Austrian III Corps under General Gyulay attacked the suburb of Lindenau and had success at first, forcing Marshal Ney to divert General Bertrand's IV Corps to hold the position. But soon the French held, the fighting later ground down into a stalemate, and the Austrians were driven back not far from the village. However, for the French, there was also a negative strategic consequence for this minor success. IV Corps was needed by Napoleon for his attacks on the main Austro-Russian armies positioned at the south, and since they did not take part in the attack as they were that time engaging the Austrians in Lindenau, his attack failed.

=== 17 October ===
There were only two actions on 17 October, one an attack by Russian General Sacken on General Dąbrowski's Polish division at the village of Gohlis. In the end, the numbers and determination of the Russians prevailed and the Poles retreated to Pfaffendorf. Blücher, who was made a field marshal the day before, ordered General Lanskoi's Russian 2nd Hussar Division to attack General Arrighi's III Cavalry Corps. As they had the day before, the Allied cavalry proved to be superior, driving the French away with great losses.

==== Arrival of reinforcements ====
The French received only 14,000 troops as reinforcements. On the other hand, the Allies were strengthened by the arrival of 145,000 troops divided into two armies, one commanded by Bennigsen from the Army of Bohemia's first line and the other, the Army of the North which consisted of Swedish, Russian and Prussian troops, commanded by Charles John.

=== 18 October ===
==== Napoleon's attempt to sue for an armistice ====
It was soon evident that the Allies would encircle Napoleon and his army, and he knew that not retreating from the battle would mean capitulation for his entire army, which by this time were starting to run out of supplies and ammunition. So Napoleon began to examine whether the roads and bridges of Lindenau could be used to withdraw his troops, or at the very least to secure a bridgehead crossing on the Pleiße River. However, he was not yet in the mood for withdrawing as he thought to achieve one more great victory for France. He also thought that a strong, formidable rear guard in Leipzig itself could repulse any Allied assault, which could buy him and his forces more time to withdraw from the battle.

During this time, Napoleon sent Merveldt, who had been captured two days earlier, back to the Allies on parole. Merveldt was given a letter to Alexander I, Francis I, and Frederick William III in which Napoleon offered to surrender to the Allies the fortresses he held along the Oder and Vistula, on the condition that the Allies allow him to withdraw to a position behind the Saale. He added that, if approved, they should sign an armistice and undertake peace negotiations. However, all three monarchs declined the offer.

==== Coalition armies encircle Napoleon ====
Actions as of 18 October

The Allies launched a huge assault from all sides, this time completely encircling Napoleon's army. In over nine hours of fighting, in which both sides suffered heavy casualties, the French troops were slowly forced back towards Leipzig. The Allies had Blücher and Charles John to the north, Barclay de Tolly and Bennigsen, and Prince von Hesse-Homburg to the south, as well as Gyulay to the west.

==== Actions at Wachau, Lössnig (Lößnig), and Dölitz ====
The Prussian 9th Brigade occupied the abandoned village of Wachau while the Austrians, with General Bianchi's Hungarians, threw the French out of Lößnig. The Austrians proceeded to give a demonstration of combined arms cooperation as Austrian cavalry attacked French infantry to give the Austrian infantry time to arrive and deploy in the attack on Dölitz, but the Young Guard threw them out. At this point, three Austrian grenadier battalions began to contest for the village with artillery support.

==== Action at Probstheida ====
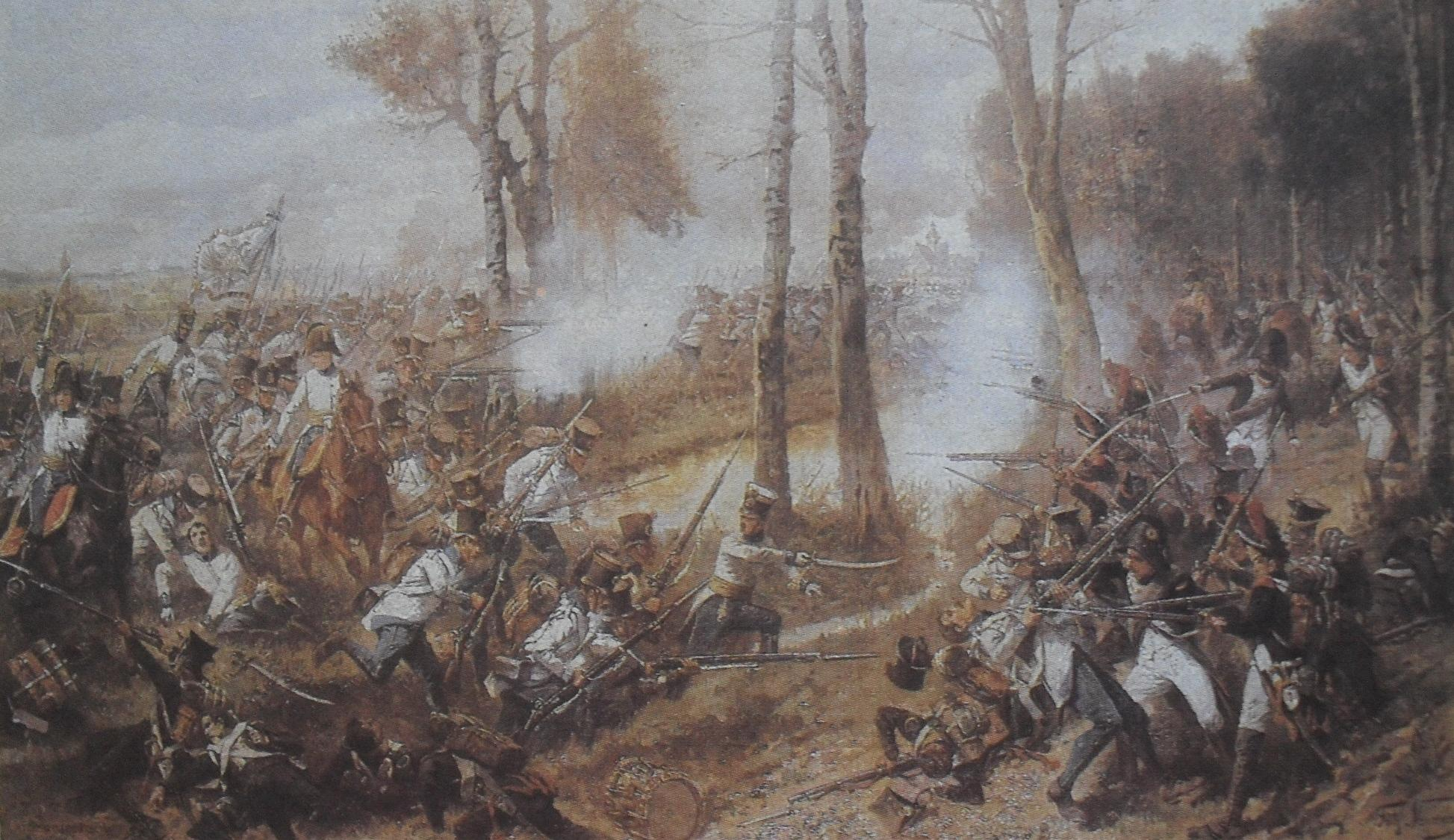
Troops of the 19th Hungarian Regiment engaging French infantry

The bloodiest fighting of the battle occurred in Probstheida, a village just southeast of Leipzig. Here, about 60,000 soldiers under Barclay were marching and advancing towards the village in two columns, one under von Kleist advancing through Wachau, and one under General Wittgenstein advancing through Liebertwolkwitz. Barclay was pressured by the monarchs, especially Alexander I, to take the village since it was the key to the positions of Napoleon's troops, and although von Kleist opposed this, the monarchs' orders were paramount, so Barclay had to follow their orders anyway.

The French dispositions at the village, however, were heavily fortified, thanks to the high and thick garden walls that gave excellent protection for the French infantry. The defense was also strengthened with artillery and strong infantry reserves behind the village. A day earlier, the Russians had taken most of the losses incurred during the battle, so it was the Prussians who took the initiative.

Prussian jägers attempted to enter the village by storm but were quickly driven back. Then the artillery of both sides opened fire upon the village; despite the enormous amount of artillery that the Allies had brought with them, the more powerful French Imperial Guard artillery gradually gained the upper hand. The Prussians conducted a series of attacks against the French positions at the village, but because the French artillery repulsed each attack, their efforts were in vain. French cuirassiers, under Murat, charged upon the weakened Prussian lines and drove them back. Counter-charges by the numerous Russian cavalry saved the infantry by repeatedly driving back the French cavalry, albeit with heavy losses. The Prussians again conducted a charge upon French lines, but this charge was less successful than the first one. The third assault was now conducted, this time, by the Russians, commanded by General Raevsky, the hero of Borodino who had arrived a few days earlier from Russia after a delay due to sickness. The assault on the village was somewhat more successful than the first two, taking the gardens and destroying several French infantry units, but it was eventually driven back by the French Imperial Guard, who had just arrived at the scene. Despite Schwarzenberg's request that Alexander send the Russian Imperial Guard, the Russian emperor ordered that more assaults were to be undertaken against the village. However, despite their successful, stubborn defense, the French were now in dire straits as they were dangerously short of manpower, and thus the fighting became only a hollow tactical victory for them.

==== Actions at Paunsdorf and Schönefeld ====
During that morning, Charles John and Blücher held a conference in Breitenfeld. It was agreed that Charles John's Army of the North would pass the Parthe River at Taucha with a reinforcement of 30,000 men drawn from Blücher's Army of Silesia. Blücher agreed to dispatch Langeron's army corps, and to renounce his rank and his rights as army commander, putting himself at the head of his Prussians. The advance of the Army of the North towards Leipzig had been slow, purportedly because Charles John had received word that Napoleon planned a renewed attack towards Berlin after his marshals' failure to take the city in the battles of Großbeeren and Dennewitz.

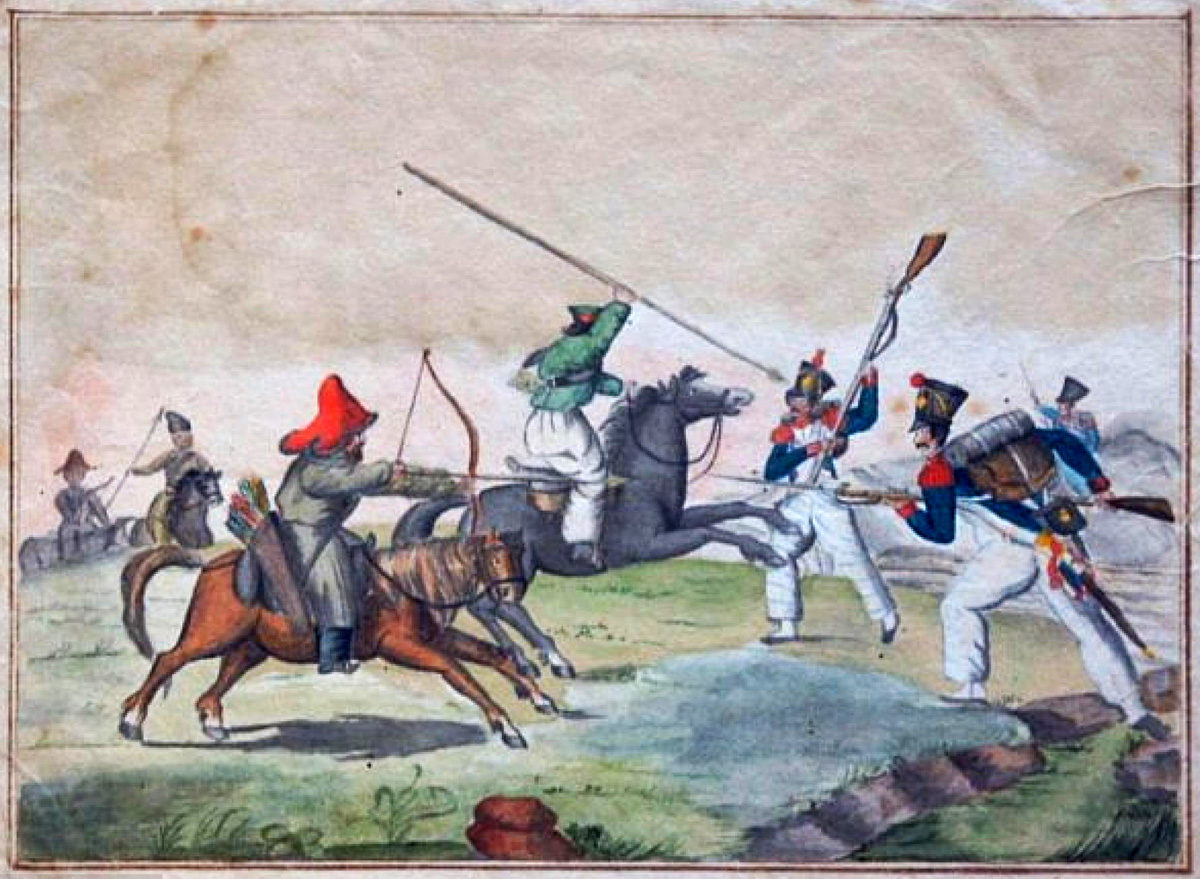
French soldiers in skirmish with Bashkirs and Cossacks

General Platov's Russian heavy artillery began to fire on the Saxons around Paunsdorf. Langeron placed pontoon bridges over the Parthe River and a flying bridge via Mockau. Large masses of troops had now moved to the east bank of the river. Meanwhile, Russian and Austrian forces began attacking French and Saxon positions in Paunsdorf, but after counterattacks by French infantry and deadly canister shots from Franco-Saxon batteries, were driven back. After their withdrawal, the Allied troops were pursued by French infantry before being counterattacked by Austrian hussar cavalry, in turn driving the French back. The town itself was still held by five Franco-Saxon battalions. Captain Bogue of the British Rocket Brigade, advanced with his unit and began firing Congreve rockets into the town, causing the defenders to fall back in disorder. Bogue, seizing the moment, charged at the head of his escort squadron of cavalry. This small force was in turn being driven out of Paunsdorf, but a barrage of rockets fired in close support again caused the French troops to break ranks. The French fell back to Sellerhausen pursued by two Prussian battalions, while the Rocket Brigade formed on the left of a Russian battery and began firing on the retreating columns, causing near-panic. At this time, Captain Bogue was shot in the head and killed by a skirmisher. Shortly after, the reserve French Young and Old Guard drove the Allies out of Paunsdorf again, but eventually Ney judged the position untenable and ordered a withdrawal.

More heavy fighting occurred in Schönefeld. Allied troops repeatedly assaulted French positions there, but were forced back. French infantry attacks on Allied positions produced similar results. Repeated assaults by Russian musketeers and grenadiers under Langeron finally drove the French out of Schönefeld. The heavy fighting in Paunsdorf and Schönefeld set both villages on fire.

==== Action at Lindenau ====
On the western front, the French IV Corps under Bertrand finally drove the Austrian III Corps under Gyulay away from Lindenau. This broke the encirclement which the Allied forces earlier had made against the Grande Armée, clearing the way for its retreat which would take place later the next day.

==== Pro-Napoleonic Germans defect to the Coalition ====
During the fighting, 5,400 Saxons of General Reynier's VII Corps defected to the Coalition, specifically Charles John's Army of the North due to the esteem the Saxons had for the former French marshal. Four years prior, Charles John, while still a Marshal of the French Empire, had commanded the wholly Saxon IX Corps during the Battle of Wagram where his mild and courteous behavior toward them in the weeks prior, along with a controversial Order of the Day praising their courage after the battle, greatly endeared Charles John to them. At first, French officers saw the Saxons' rushing towards the advancing Prussians as a charge, but treachery became evident as they saw the Saxons asking the Prussians to join with them for the impending assault. Reynier himself witnessed this, and he rallied the remaining Saxons at his disposal, but to no avail, because Württemberg's cavalry also deserted from the French, forcing the French line in Paunsdorf to fall back.

==== The Grande Armée begins to retreat ====
The battle during the day of 18 October was one of attrition. French troops held on to their respective positions, but were steadily being worn out and depleted by fierce and intensifying Allied attacks throughout the day. The French artillery had only 20,000 rounds left. Later that night, Napoleon was treating the battle as a lost cause. At this time, he promoted Poniatowski to the rank of Maréchal d'Empire, the only foreigner of all his marshals who was given this title, and the latter swore that he would fight to the last stand, which he did. After this, the emperor began to stage the retreat for the Grande Armée westward across the White Elster River.

During the night the French army had been ordered to withdraw silently from Connewitz, Probstheida, Stotteritz, Volkmansdorf, and Reudnitz, all to cross the river via Leipzig and the single bridge in the river. Those in Lindenau were to move to Weissenfels. Weak rear guards occupied the villages in order to conceal the retreat, and support troops were placed in the outer suburbs by the wind mills and near the walls of the city. The garden and cemetery walls by the Grimma Gate were pierced with loopholes as well as the gates themselves. Skirmishers were posted in the farm houses, in the brush, in the parks, and everywhere possible. Leipzig was to be occupied by Reynier's VII Corps, Poniatowski's VIII Corps and MacDonald's XI Corps. They were ordered to hold it for a day or a bit longer, in order to allow the rest of the army, its artillery, and its equipment sufficient time to evacuate. The Allied cavalry advance posts were ordered to attack without relief the French advanced posts during the night to determine whether or not the French were attempting to withdraw. However, they failed to realize that the French were, in fact, pulling out from the battle area. Therefore, the evacuation continued throughout the night.

=== 19 October ===
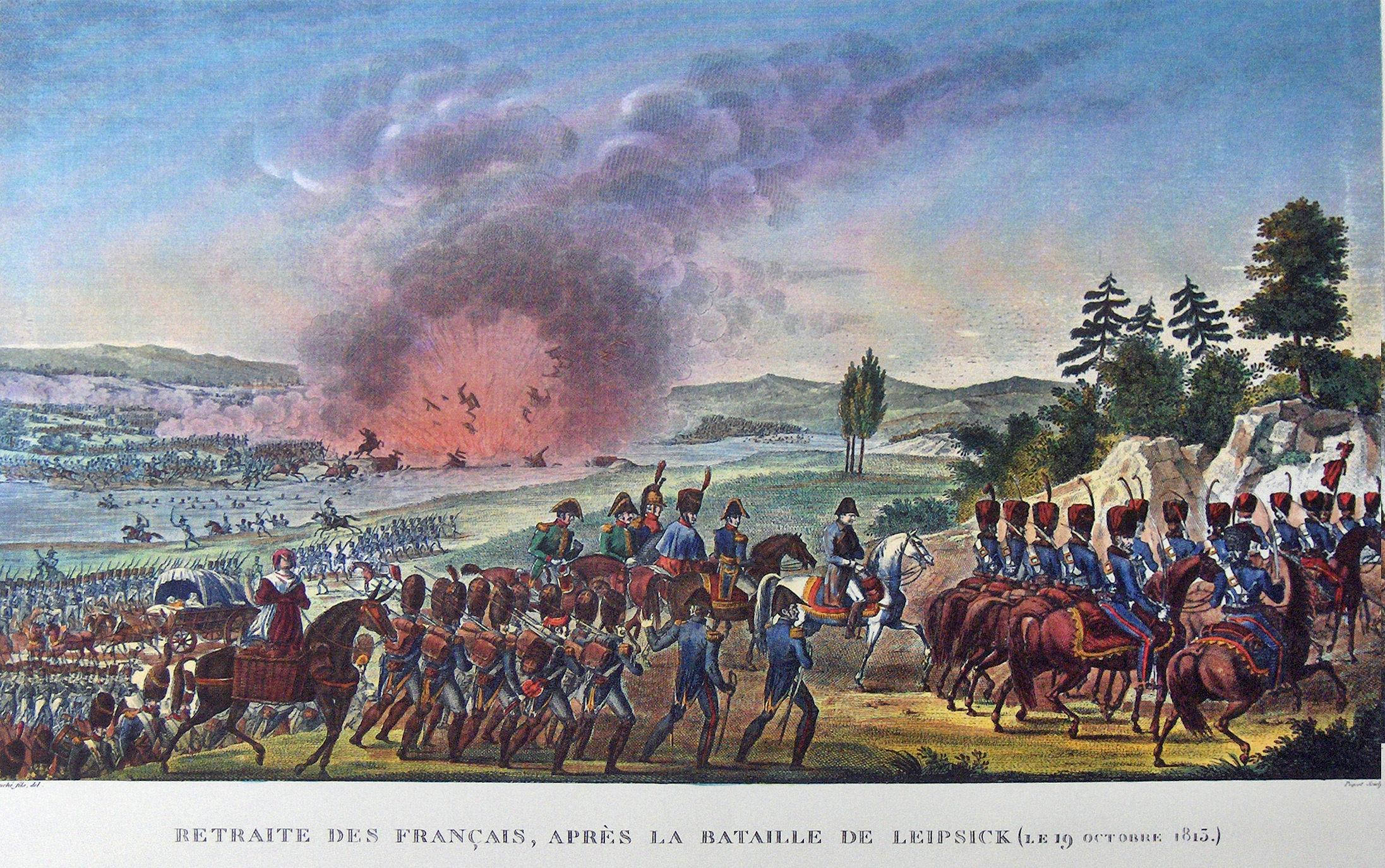
Napoleon's retreat on 19 October 1813, showing the explosion of the bridge

The Allies had only learned of the French evacuation at 7:00 on the morning of 19 October. Soon thereafter between 8:00–9:00 am they launched a full-scale assault from the north, south, and east against the retreating French. But they were held up in Leipzig because of a ferocious street-to-street rearguard action fought by Marshal Oudinot's 30,000 troops. As the Russians and Prussians entered the city through the Halle and Grimma gates they fell upon barricades and houses full of French soldiers. Civilians were forced into hiding as the bloody urban combat raged throughout the city.

==== Sweden fully participates ====
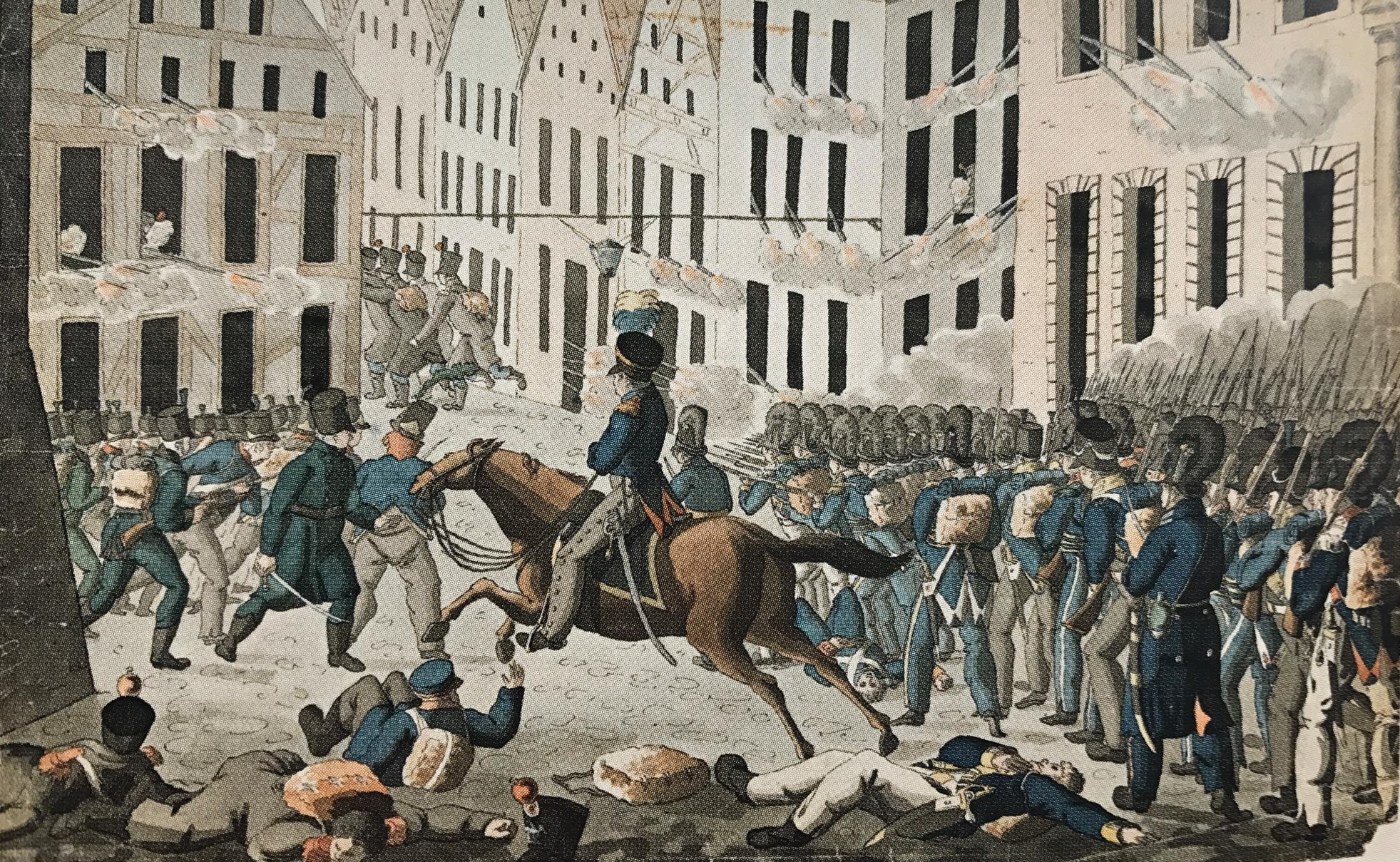
Swedish troops assaulting Leipzig

In the meantime, at the behest of his officers, who felt embarrassed that they had not participated in the battle, Charles John gave the order for his light infantry to participate in the final assault on Leipzig itself. The Swedish jägers performed very well, losing only 35 men dead and 173 wounded while capturing 647 French prisoners.

=== French Withdrawal ===
Napoleon's disorganized retreat, where he failed to order the building of more bridges for the French retreat, continued until early afternoon when General Dulauloy, tasked with destroying the only bridge over the Elster, delegated the task to Colonel Montfort. The colonel then passed this responsibility to a corporal, who was unaware of the carefully planned time schedule. The corporal ignited the fuses at 1:00 in the afternoon while the bridge was still crowded with retreating French troops and Oudinot's rearguard was still in Leipzig. The explosion and subsequent panic caused a rout that resulted in the deaths of thousands of French troops and the capture of 30,000 others. Both Oudinot and MacDonald managed to swim their way across but Poniatowski, hampered by his wounds, was one of the many who drowned while attempting to cross the river.

== Conclusion ==
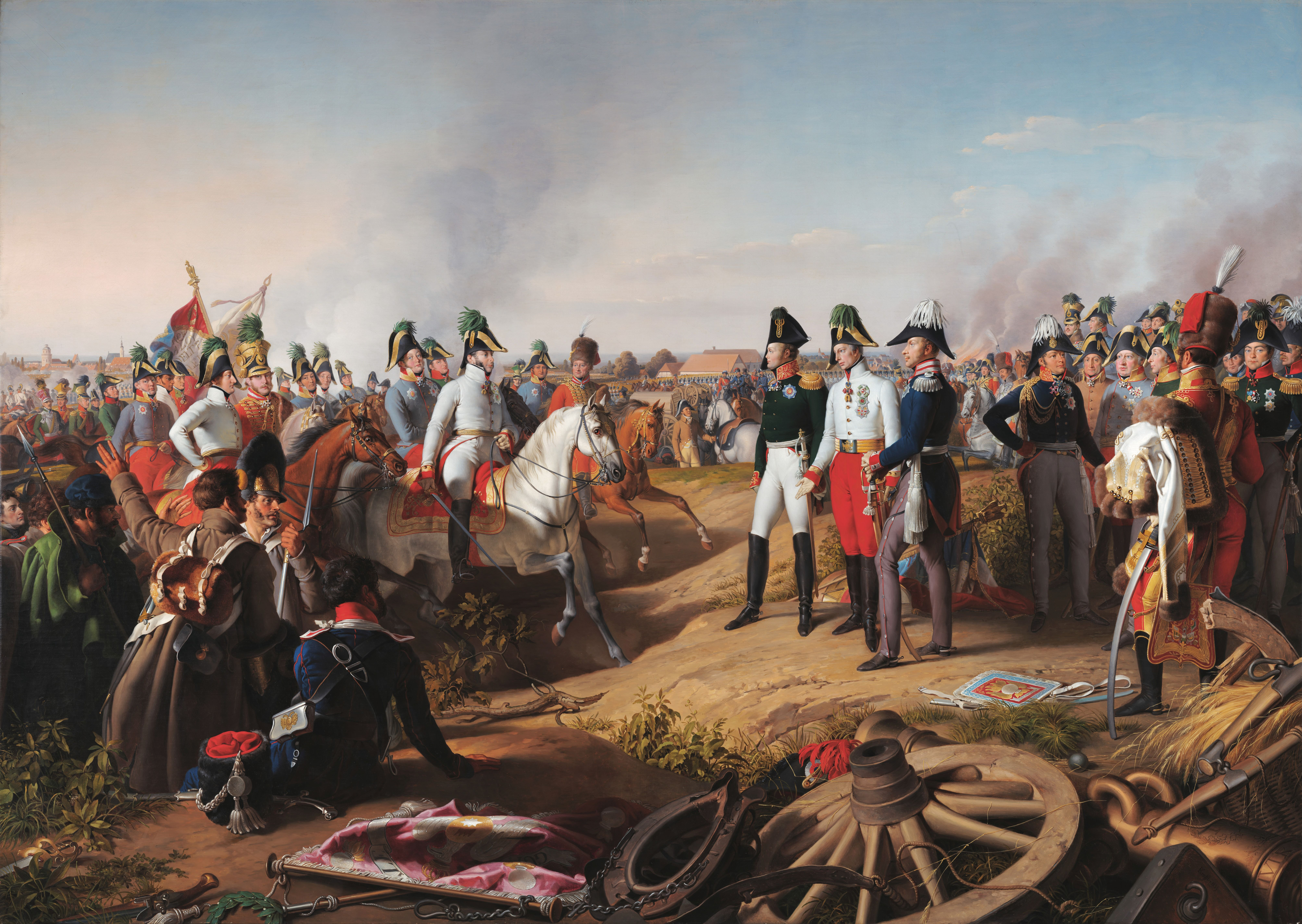
The Declaration of Victory After the Battle of Leipzig by Johann Peter Krafft, 1839.Alexander I of Russia, Francis I of Austria, and Frederick William III of Prussia meeting after the battle

By the end of the battle on the afternoon of 19 October, the remnants of the Grande Armée had crossed the Elster River and begun a well-ordered retreat. The battle had ended conclusively and decisively with the nations of the Coalition as the victors, and the German Campaign was a complete failure for the French, although they achieved a minor victory when the Bavarian Army attempted to block the retreat of the Grande Armée at Hanau. The heavy casualties the Coalition armies had incurred and their exhaustion from the bloody 4-day battle they fought made it impossible for them to promptly pursue the retreating Grande Armée. The French were also exhausted after the battle, and were themselves retreating at a fast pace towards the Rhine.

== Casualties ==
The Battle of Leipzig was the bloodiest of the Napoleonic Wars, with over 400,000 rounds of artillery ammunition having been expended. Casualties on both sides were astoundingly high, such that locals had difficulty disposing of the corpses, with some still visible the following year. Estimates range from 80,000 to 110,000 total killed, wounded, or missing.

Napoleon lost about 38,000 killed and wounded and likely thousands of horses. In Napoleon's disastrous disorganized retreat, the Allies captured 15,000 able-bodied Frenchmen, 21,000 wounded or sick, 325 guns, 28 eagles, standards, or colours, and most of the French supply trains. Six French generals were killed, 12 wounded, and 36 captured including Lauriston and Reynier.

Out of a total force of 360,000, the Allies suffered approximately 54,000 casualties. Schwarzenberg's Army of Bohemia lost 34,000, Blücher's Army of Silesia lost 12,000, while Charles John's Army of the North and Bennigsen's Army of Poland lost about 4,000 each.

== Aftermath ==
A year ago all Europe marched with us; today all Europe marches against us.

— Napoleon

The battle ended the French Empire's presence east of the Rhine and brought secondary German states (e.g. Baden, Saxony, and Württemberg) over to the Coalition with the largest German states of Austria and Prussia. It also dealt a harsh blow to Napoleon himself, who had a second French army destroyed in as many years, and was decisively defeated in battle again, repeating such defeats as the one suffered in 1809 at the Battle of Aspern-Essling, severely damaging his reputation of invincibility. Alexander I now urged all of his subordinate commanders including those of Austria, Prussia, and other nations to push the gigantic Coalition army on the offensive after the battle, and, having decisively won the battle, was more than ever determined to carry the war onto French soil.

Three weeks after Leipzig, having won the Battle of Hanau, Napoleon arrived at Saint-Cloud to organize the defense of France. When he went back to Paris at the year's end, his first words on entering the Senate, after his return from the battle disaster, sad and low in mood, were, "A year ago all Europe marched with us; today all Europe marches against us." Half a million troops had been lost in the German Campaign of 1813.

With the Confederation of the Rhine dissolved and Prussia once again becoming one of the continent's great powers after its severe setbacks in 1806, the Coalition armies pressed the advantage and invaded France in early 1814. Napoleon engaged some of their units during his counter-offensive campaign. After Paris fell to the Coalition on 31 March, he abdicated on 6 April. Forced into exile on the island of Elba Napoleon arrived there on 30 May.

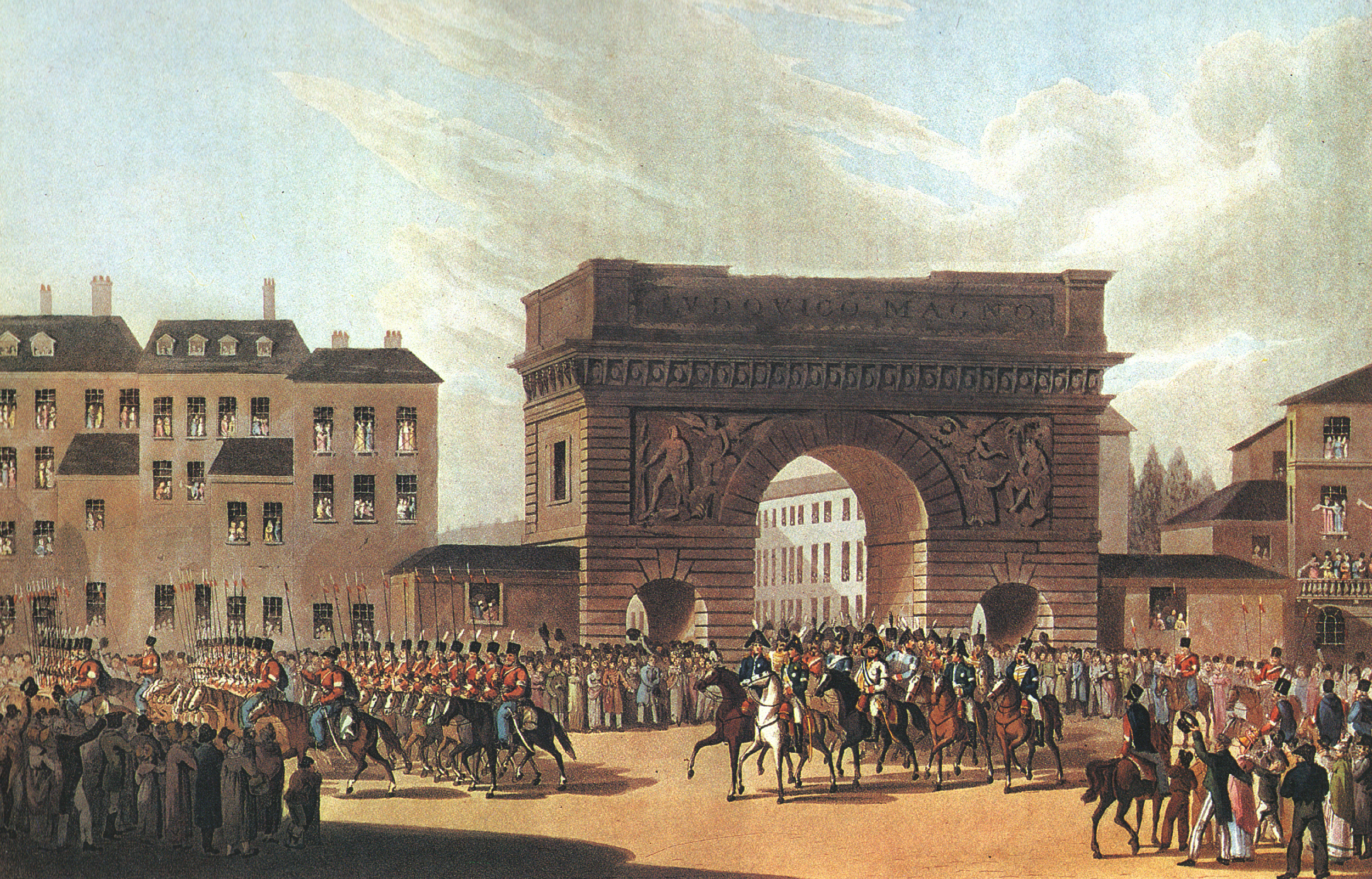
The Russian Army entering Paris, 1814

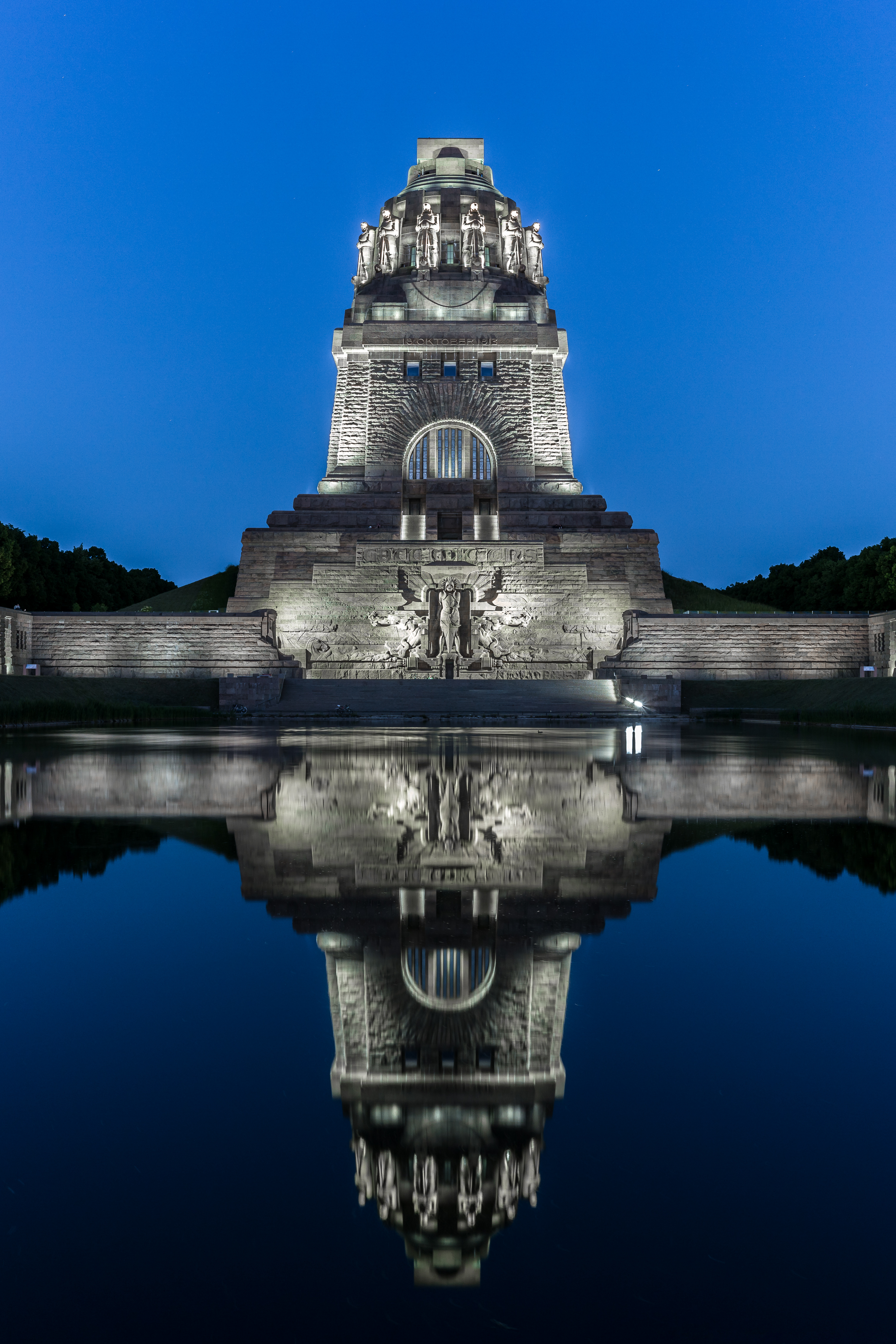
Völkerschlachtdenkmal: Monument to the Battle of the Nations in Leipzig, completed in 1913

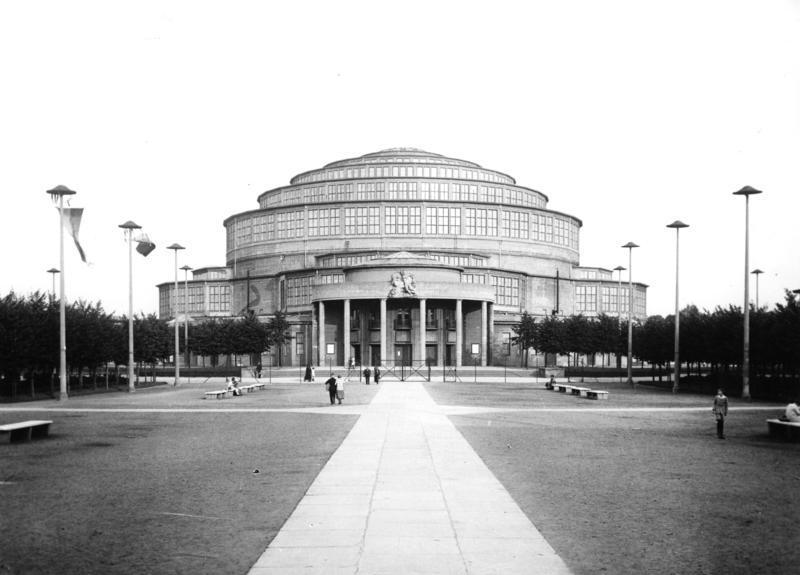
Jahrhunderthalle in Breslau (Wrocław in Poland), also completed in 1913

== Legacy ==
In 1863, exactly 50 years after the battle, a Bridge blasting monument was inaugurated in Leipzig.

The 91-metre (299 ft) Monument to the Battle of the Nations (Völkerschlachtdenkmal) was completed in 1913 according to a design by Bruno Schmitz at a cost of six million German gold marks. The Russian Memorial Church was also dedicated to coincide with the hundredth anniversary of the battle and honored the Russian troops who fought in the battle. The course of the battle in the city of Leipzig is marked by numerous monuments and the 50 Apel-stones that mark important lines of the French and Allied troops.

The 1913 Centennial Exhibition was held in Breslau (now Wrocław), for which was built an extensive venue centered around the Centennial Hall. It was listed as a UNESCO World Heritage Site in 2006.

== See also ==
- Military career of Napoleon Bonaparte
- Battle of Dresden
- Battle of Waterloo
- German campaign of 1813
- Volunteer Riflemen Corps von Schmidt

== Notes ==
Preceded by Battle of the Bidassoa	Napoleonic Wars; Battle of Leipzig	Succeeded by Battle of Hanau
