= Matthias Rentzsch =

German politician (born 1977)

Member of the Bundestag
- Incumbent
- Assumed office 25 March 2025
- Preceded by: Lars Rohwer
- Constituency: Dresden II – Bautzen II

Personal details
- Born: 1977 (age 48–49)
- Party: Alternative for Germany

Matthias Rentzsch (born 1977) is a German politician who was elected as a member of the Bundestag in 2025. From 2019 to 2024, he was a city councillor of Dresden.
