= Wie ein Fest nach langer Trauer =

Christian hymn

- Christian hymn
- English: "Like a feast after long mourning"
- Written: 1988
- Text: by Jürgen Werth
- Language: German
- Melody: by Johannes Nitsch
- Composed: 1988

"Wie ein Fest nach langer Trauer" (Like a feast after long mourning) is a 1988 Christian song with text by Jürgen Werth, with a melody by Johannes Nitsch. The hymn of the genre Neues Geistliches Lied is contained in several hymnals and songbooks. It is also known by its refrain, "So ist Versöhnung" (Such is reconciliation).

== History ==
The text of "Wie ein Fest nach langer Trauer" was written by Jürgen Werth. The melody was composed by Johannes Nitsch. The hymn of the genre Neues Geistliches Lied is contained in several hymnals and songbooks. It is also known by its refrain, "So ist Versöhnung" (Such is reconciliation).
