= Kleine Röder =

Kleine Röder is the name of the following rivers in Germany:

- Kleine Röder (Große Röder), right tributary of the Große Röder near Cunnersdorf, municipality of Ottendorf-Okrilla, county of Bautzen, Saxony
- Kleine Röder (Black Elster) or Schwarzgraben, left tributary of the Black Elster near Zobersdorf, borough of Bad Liebenwerda, county of Elbe-Elster, Brandenburg
