= Kleine Röder (Große Röder) =

River in Germany

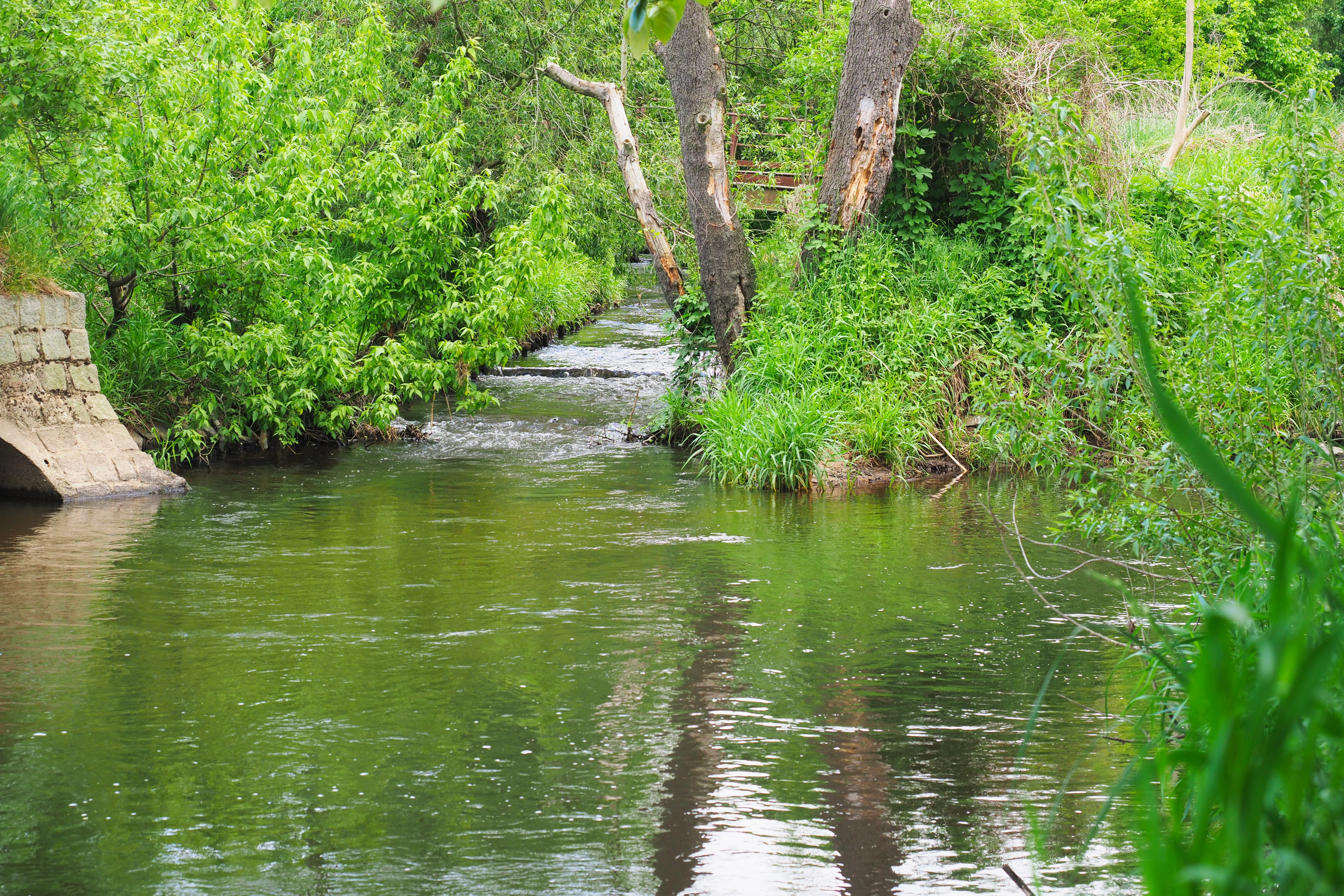
- Confluence with the Große Röder at Ottendorf-Okrilla

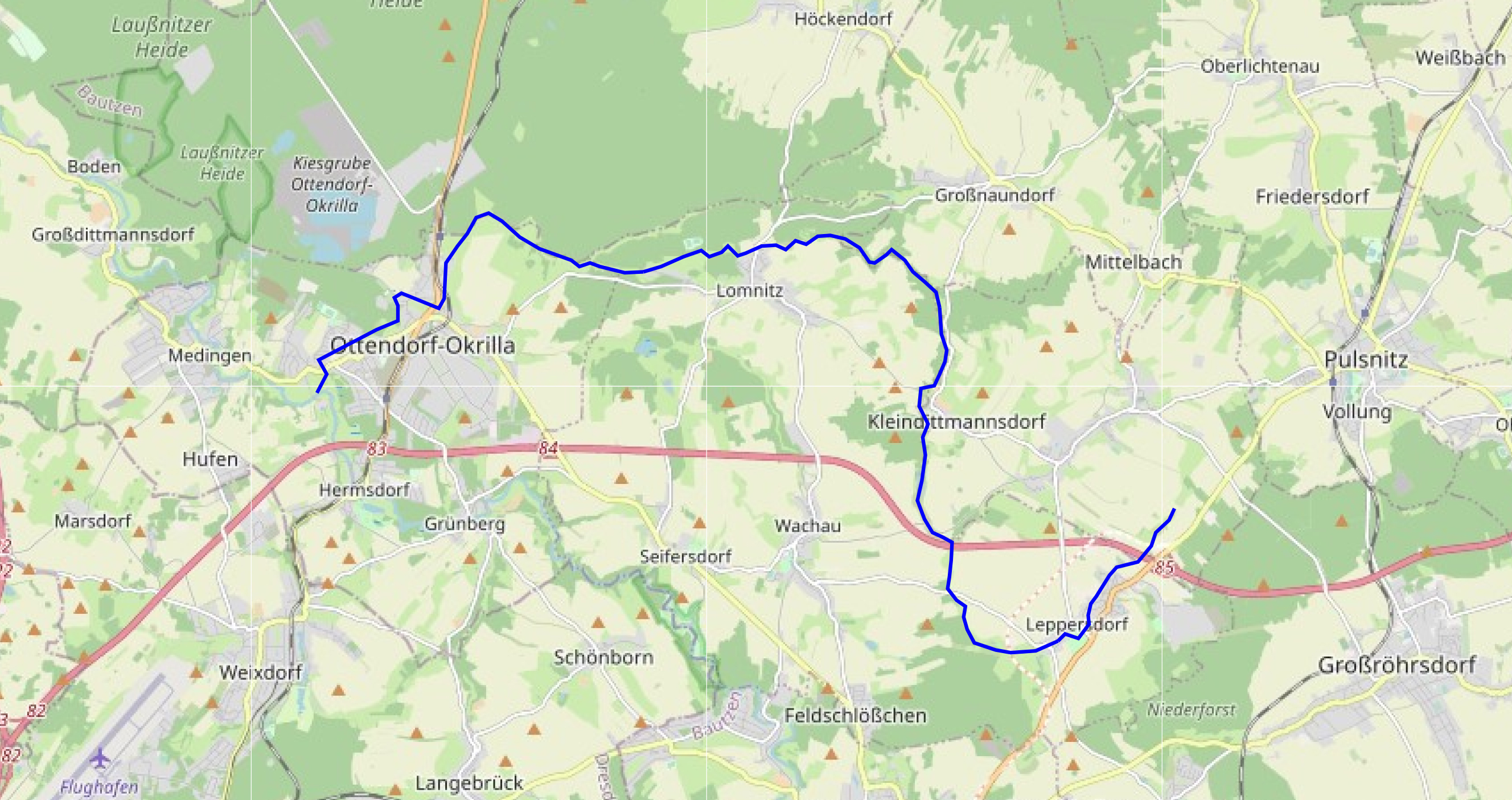
- Course from its source north of Leppersdorf to its confluence with the Große Röder at Ottendorf-Okrilla

Location
- Location: Bautzen, Saxony, Germany
- Reference no.: DE: 53844

Physical characteristics
- Source
  - location: source: on the Eierberg near Lichtenberg
  - coordinates: 51°10′12″N 13°58′47″E
  - elevation: 302 m above sea level (NN)
- Mouth
  - location: from the right in Cunnersdorf (village in Ottendorf-Okrilla) into the Große Röder
  - coordinates: 51°10′43.52″N 13°48′44.85″E
  - elevation: 162 m above sea level (NN)
- Length: 20 km

Basin features
- Progression: Große Röder → Black Elster → Elbe → North Sea
- River system: Elbe
- Landmarks: Villages: Wachau, Lichtenberg, Ottendorf-Okrilla
- Tributaries
  - left: Orla
  - right: Mittelwasser

The Kleine Röder or Wilde Röder is a river in the eastern German state of Saxony. It is about 20 km (12 mi) long and rises on the southwestern slopes of the Eierberg near Lichtenberg in the district of Bautzen at an elevation of 320 m (1,050 ft).

Below Leppersdorf (a village in the borough of Wachau), the stream changes its course from southwest to north, following the general lie of the land. It flows through Kleindittmannsdorf with its four former water mills. On the edge of the mighty Okrilla Basin Sands (Okrillaer Beckensande) it swings west and discharges into the Große Röder in Cunnersdorf (a village in the borough Ottendorf-Okrilla). Its longest tributaries are, from the south, the Orla and, from the north, the Großnaundorfer Wasser.

There are frequent floods in the catchment area of the Kleinen Röder. Flood damage was recorded in the years 1958, 2002, 2006, 2010, 2011, 2012 and 2013. Ein großes Hochwasser trat am 12. und 13. August 2002 auf. There was particularly serious damage in Leppersdorf and Ottendorf-Okrilla. Additionally, the plunge pool of the Kleindittmannsdorf Reservoir was destroyed.

== See also ==
- List of rivers of Saxony
