= Spellerberg =

Spellerberg is a Danish surname. Notable people with the surname include:

- Bo Spellerberg (born 1979), Danish handball player and coach
- Louise Svalastog Spellerberg (born 1982), Danish handball player
- Merle Spellerberg (born 1996), German politician
