= Appel =

Appel may refer to:

== Places ==
- Appel, Germany, a municipality in Lower Saxony, Germany
- Appel, Netherlands, a hamlet in the Dutch province of Gelderland

== Other uses ==
- Appel (surname), including list of people with the surname
- Appel reaction, an organic chemical reaction
- A fencing term
- Appel, another name for the UFO religion Siderella

== See also ==
- Appell, a surname
- Apel (disambiguation)
- Apple (disambiguation)
- De Appel, a contemporary arts centre, Amsterdam, Netherlands
