= Appell =

Appell is a surname. Notable people with the surname include:

- Dave Appell (1922–2014), American arranger, producer, and musician
- Olga Appell (born 1963), Mexican-American long-distance runner
- Paul Émile Appell or M. P. Appell (1855–1930), French mathematician and rector of the University of Paris
  - Appell polynomials, a polynomial sequence named after Paul Appell
  - Appell's equation of motion, an alternative formulation of classical mechanics

== See also ==
- Apel (disambiguation)
- Appel (disambiguation)
- Apple
- Apple (disambiguation)
