= Arnold Vaatz =

German politician

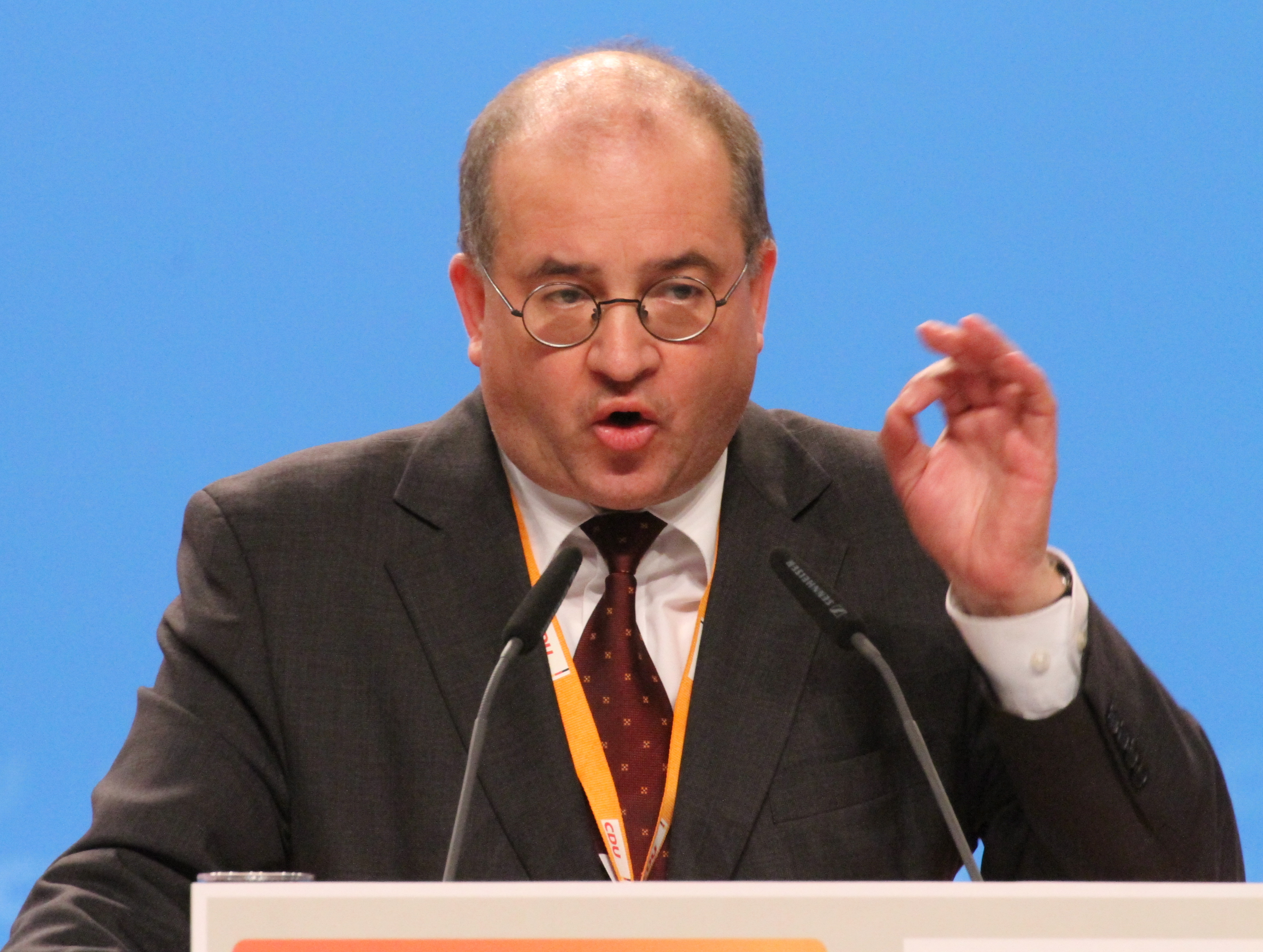
- Arnold Vaatz in 2014

Member of the Bundestag for Dresden II – Bautzen II
- In office 1998–2021

Personal details
- Born: 9 August 1955 (age 71) Weida, East Germany (now Germany)
- Party: CDU

Arnold Vaatz (born 9 August 1955) is a German politician of represents the Christian Democratic Union (CDU) who served as a member of the Bundestag from the state of Saxony from 1998 until 2021.

== Political career ==
Vaatz became a member of the Bundestag after the 1998 German federal election. He was a member of the Committee on Education, Research and Technology Assessment and the Committee on Petitions. Vaatz did not stand for reelection in the 2021 German federal election.
