= Apel (surname) =

Apel is a surname. Notable people with the surname include:

- Erich Apel (1917–1965), German SED politician
- Hans Apel (1932–2011), German SPD politician
- Johann August Apel (1771–1816), German writer
- Karl-Otto Apel (1922–2017), German philosopher
- Katrin Apel (born 1973), former biathlete
- Willi Apel (1893–1988), German-U.S. musicologist
