= Radostowo, Olsztyn County =

Radostowo
- Village
- Location within Poland
- Coordinates: 53°59′6″N 20°36′21″E
- Country: Poland
- Voivodeship: Warmian-Masurian
- County: Olsztyn
- Gmina: Jeziorany
- Population: 1,150

Radostowo [radɔsˈtɔvɔ] is a village in the administrative district of Gmina Jeziorany, within Olsztyn County, Warmian-Masurian Voivodeship, in northern Poland.
