= Merle Spellerberg =

German politician (born 1996)

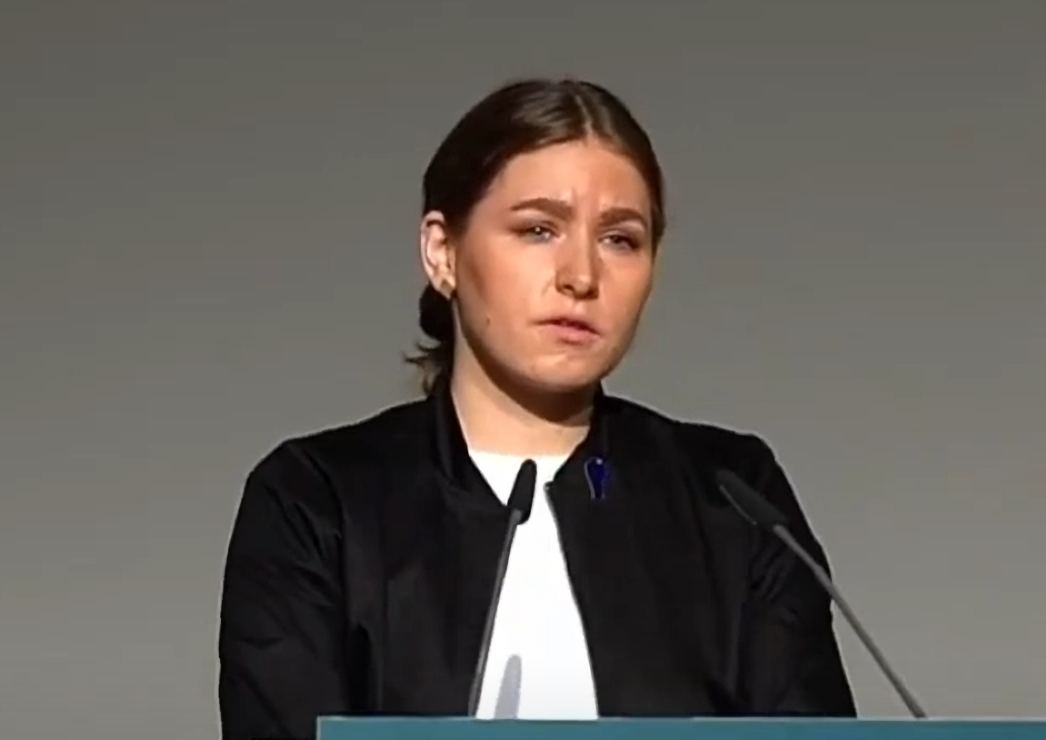
- Spellerberg in 2021

Member of the Bundestag
- In office 26 October 2021 – 25 March 2025

Personal details
- Born: 13 November 1996 (age 29) Höxter, Germany
- Party: Alliance 90/The Greens

Merle Spellerberg (born 13 November 1996) is a German politician of the Alliance 90/The Greens. She was a member of the Bundestag from 2021 to 2025, representing the Dresden II – Bautzen II constituency.

== Early life and education ==
Spellerberg attended the König-Wilhelm-Gymnasium Höxter, where she received her Abitur in 2016. She studied at the TU Dresden.

== Political career ==
In parliament, Spellerberg serves on the Committee on Foreign Affairs, the Defence Committee and the Subcommittee on Disarmament, Arms Control and Non-Proliferation.

In addition to her committee assignments, Spellerberg has been an alternate member of the German delegation to the Parliamentary Assembly of the Council of Europe (PACE) since 2022. In the Assembly, she serves on the Committee on Equality and Non-Discrimination and the Sub-Committee on Gender Equality. She has also been a member of the German delegation to the NATO Parliamentary Assembly, where she is part of the Defence and Security Committee and the Political Committee.

== Other activities ==
- Federal Academy for Security Policy (BAKS), Member of the Advisory Board (since 2022)
