= Johannes Nitsch =

Former German politician (born 1937)

Member of the Volkskammer
- In office 18 March 1990 – 2 October 1990
- Succeeded by: Legislature dissolved

Member of the Bundestag for Dresden II constituency
- In office 3 October 1990 – 16 October 1998
- Preceded by: Seat created
- Succeeded by: Arnold Vaatz

Personal details
- Born: 24 March 1937 (age 89) Freudenberg, Germany (now Radostowo, Poland)
- Party: East German Christian Democratic Union (1989–1990); Christian Democratic Union of Germany (1990–present)
- Children: 3
- Education: Technische Universität Ilmenau

Johannes Nitsch (born 24 March 1937) is a German politician and former member of the Bundestag and member of the Volkskammer. Born in Freudenberg, Germany (now Radostowo, Poland), he moved to Saxony-Anhalt after the end of the Second World War. He graduated from the Technische Universität Ilmenau in 1962 as an electrical engineer. From 1962 until 1990, Nitsch worked at a state-owned electricity plant in Dresden. In the 1990 East German general election, Nitsch was elected to the Volkskammer as a member of the East German Christian Democratic Union (East German CDU). In 1990, he was named deputy chairman of the CDU/DA parliamentary group in the Volkskammer. Upon German reunification on 3 October 1990, Nitsch automatically became a member of the Bundestag for the Christian Democratic Union. From 1991 to 1994, Nitsch was the deputy chairman of the CDU/CSU parliamentary group. From 1994 until his retirement in 1998, he was Parliamentary State Secretary at the Ministry for Transport.

== Early life ==
Johannes Nitsch was born on 24 March 1937 in Freudenberg, East Prussia, Germany (now Radostowo, Poland). From 1943 to October 1944, Nitsch attended Volksschule in Freudenberg. His studies were interrupted by the end of the Second World War, which brought fighting to East Prussia. In 1947, he first lived in a refugee camp near Stettin (now Szczecin, Poland) before settling in Zerbst, Saxony-Anhalt. Nitsch resumed his education in Köthen, attending elementary school there and later graduating from the Goethe-Oberschule in 1956. Between 1956 and 1962, he studied high-voltage electrical engineering at Technische Universität Ilmenau.

From his graduation in 1962 until 1990, Nitsch worked for Kombinat Verbundnetze Energie at their Energiebau Dresden electrical plant as an engineer. In 1965 he was promoted to a department head, overseeing operational planning and control. As a representative for the Treuhandanstalt, a newly-formed East German government agency responsible for the privatisation of former state-owned enterprises, he was a trustee for Energiebau Dresden from July to October 1990.

== Political career ==
In January 1989, Nitsch joined the East German CDU, a party formerly part of the Socialist Unity Party-led coalition until 1989. He had been recommended to join the party and get involved in politics by a colleague. He had previously been unaffiliated with any party. That autumn, Nitsch took part in several protests in central Dresden, around the city's train station and along Prager Straße, from which the Group of 20 was created. In October of the same year, he signed a petition calling for the resignation of the CDU's old executive committee and for a special party conference to be held. The petition was successful; in December Nitsch was sent as a delegate to that special party conference. That month he was named as a member of the party's executive committee, a post he held until September 1990.

In February 1990 Nitsch was elected as a member of the CDU's Dresden North district association board. He was elected to East Germany's legislature, the Volkskammer, in the 1990 East German general election as part of the state list for Bezirk Dresden. Nitsch stated in an interview that he had not expected to have been actually elected, as he was so far down the party's state list. He was elected as a member of the CDU/Democratic Awakening parliamentary group. In the Volkskammer, Nitsch became the deputy chairman of the CDU/DA parliamentary group as well as their spokesman for economic policy. He was a member of the committees for economic affairs and German reunification. While in the Volkskammer, his primary focus was on energy policy. His work in the last Volkskammer was under a constant rush; laws were sometimes passed with only one day of consultation and debate. The political infrastructure was so undeveloped in East Germany that he would have to walk daily to the Reichstag building in West Berlin to make calls to his counterpart in the West.

On 3 October 1990, the day of German reunification, Nitsch automatically joined the Bundestag representing the Dresden II constituency. As a member of the Bundestag, Nitsch was a member of the chamber's economic affairs committee. He was also a member of the Economic Council Germany's branch in Saxony, sitting as a state board member. He took a strong position in favour of moving the capital of Germany from Bonn, as it was in West Germany, back to Berlin. When the decision was put to a vote in the Bundestag on 20 June 1991, he voted to move the capital to Berlin, saying that the reconstruction of the new states would be helped greatly by moving the seat of government to the east.

From January 1991 to October 1994, Nitsch was the deputy chairman of the CDU/CSU parliamentary group in the Bundestag. The same year, he also became the chairman of the Commission for the Reconstruction of the New States in the CDU/CSU. During a 1994 Bundestag meeting, Nitsch underlined his support for the development of the new states and demanded special conditions for the lignite industry in Saxony. In 1994, Nitsch was named Parliamentary State Secretary at the Ministry for Transport, a position he held until 1998. Nitsch represented Germany as a signatory for a German–Slovak travel agreement in 1996. Nitsch retired from the Bundestag in 1998.

== Personal life ==
Nitsch is Catholic. He is married and has three daughters. As of February 2013, Nitsch lives in Dresden. He also has an interest in amateur beekeeping.

== Electoral history ==
Election	Constituency	Mandate	Votes	Result
1990 (Volkskammer)	Bezirk Dresden	State list	44.9%	Elected
1990 (Bundestag)	Dresden II	Direktmandat	46.5%	Elected
1994 (Bundestag)	Dresden II	Direktmandat	46.9%	Elected
