= Apel-stones =

Stones marking events during the Battle of Leipzig

Coordinates: 51°15′54″N 12°26′49″E

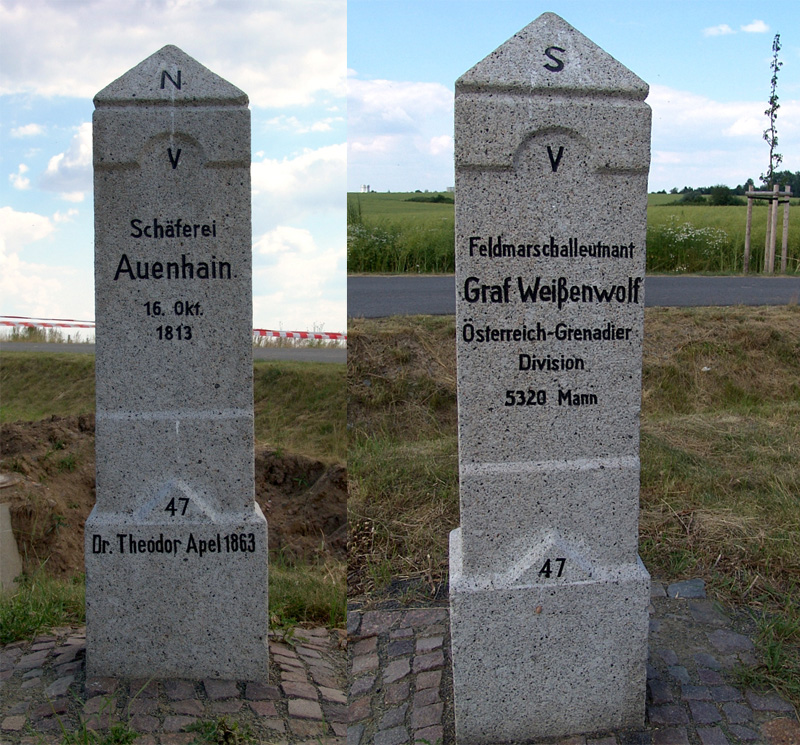
Two sides of Apel-stone number 47.

The Apel-stones, named after the writer Theodor Apel from Leipzig who commissioned them, mark important events during the Battle of Leipzig. There are 50 in total. They were sculpted by A. F. Aster, and put up between 1861 and 1865.
