= Lars Rohwer =

German politician

Member of the Bundestag
- Incumbent
- Assumed office 2021

Personal details
- Born: 1 February 1972 (age 54) Dresden, East Germany (now Germany)
- Party: CDU

Lars Rohwer (born 1 February 1972) is a German banker and politician of the Christian Democratic Union (CDU) who has been serving as a member of the Bundestag since 2021.

== Early life and career ==
Rohwer was born 1972 in the East German city of Dresden.

== Political career ==
Rohwer was first elected in 2021 for the Dresden II – Bautzen II constituency in the Bundestag.

In the negotiations to form a Grand Coalition under the leadership of Friedrich Merz's Christian Democrats (CDU together with the Bavarian CSU) and the SPD following the 2025 German elections, Rohwer was part of the CDU/CSU delegation in the working group on climate protection and energy policy, led by Andreas Jung, Martin Huber and Olaf Lies.

== Other activities ==
- LEAG, Member of the Supervisory Board (since 2022)
- Landesbank Baden-Württemberg (LBBW), Member of the Advisory Board on East Germany
- IG Bergbau, Chemie, Energie (IG BCE), Member
