= Ottendorf-Okrilla =

- Municipality
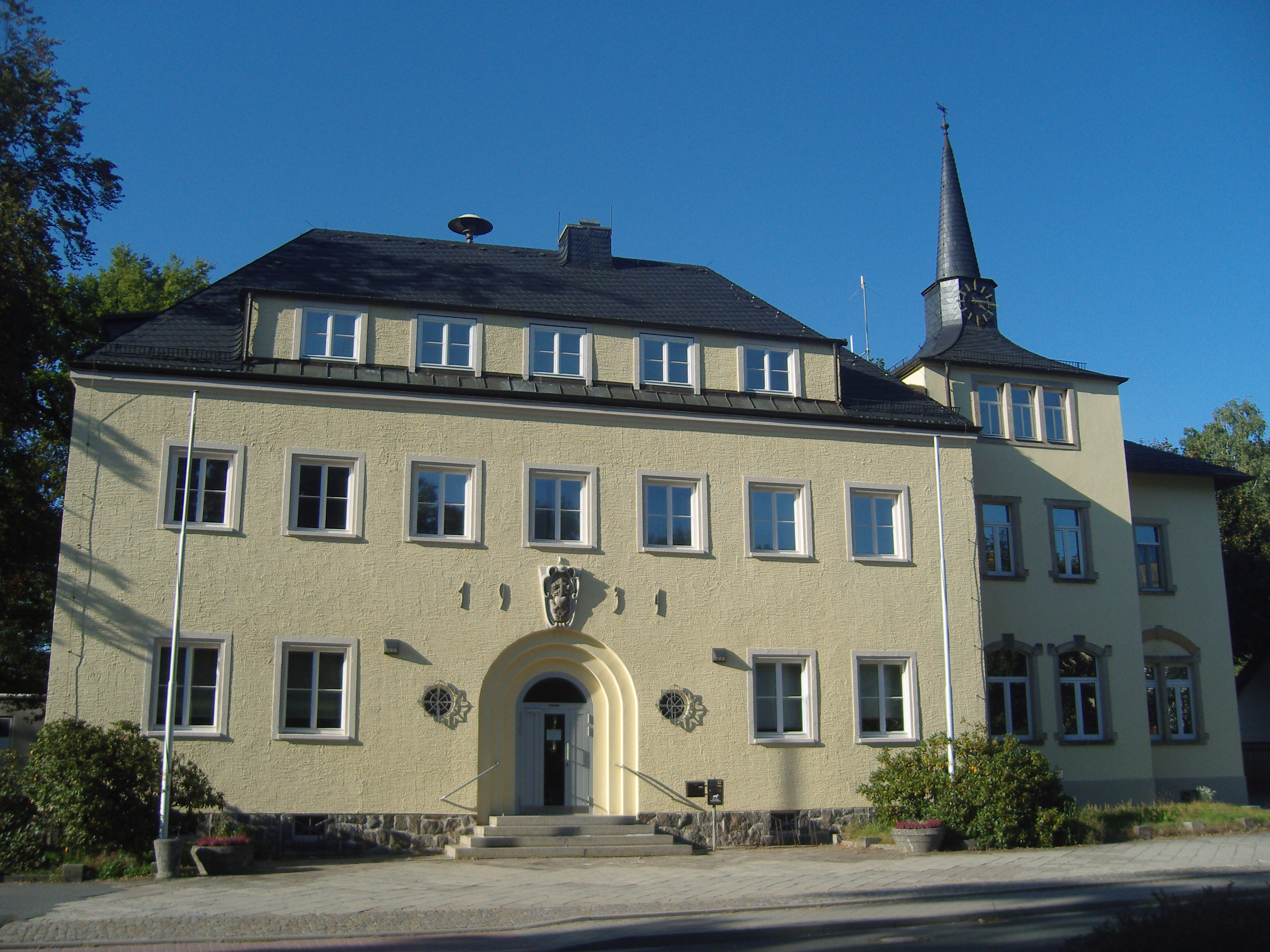
- Town hall

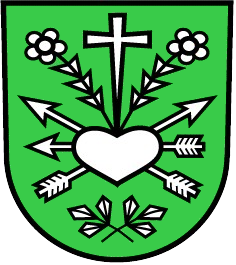
- Coat of arms

- Location of Ottendorf-Okrilla within Bautzen district
- Interactive map of Ottendorf-Okrilla
- Location within Germany Location within Saxony
- Coordinates: 51°10′45″N 13°49′34″E
- Country: Germany
- State: Saxony
- District: Bautzen
- Subdivisions: 3

Government
  - Mayor (2020–27): Rico Pfeiffer (Ind.)

Area
  - Total: 25.88 km^{2} (9.99 sq mi)
- Elevation: 180 m (590 ft)

Population (2025-12-31)
  - Total: 9,880
  - Density: 382/km^{2} (989/sq mi)
- Time zone: UTC+01:00 (CET)
  - Summer (DST): UTC+02:00 (CEST)
- Postal codes: 01458
- Dialling codes: 035205
- Vehicle registration: BZ, BIW, HY, KM
- Website: www.ottendorf-okrilla.de

Ottendorf-Okrilla is a municipality in the Bautzen district, Saxony, Germany. It is located 20 km northeast of Dresden.

== Geography ==
The area of the municipality is 25.88 km², of which 1.58 km² are commercially used. The length from north to south is 6 km and the east to west length is 7 km. The municipality is subdivided into the Ortsteile Grünberg, Hermsdorf, Medingen and Ottendorf-Okrilla. It has two exits on the motorway A4 (Dresden - Görlitz) and four stations on the railway from Dresden to Königsbrück.

== History ==
Ottendorf was first mentioned in 1346. The municipality Ottendorf-Okrilla was formed in 1921 by the merger of the former municipalities Ottendorf, Moritzdorf, Großokrilla, Kleinokrilla and Cunnersdorf. In 1994 Grünberg joined the municipality, and in 1999 Hermsdorf and Medingen.

== Population ==
Population (31 December)
1998 - 10,253; 1999 - 10,363; 2000 - 10,343	2001 - 10,255; 2002 - 10,273; 2003 - 10,184	2011 - 9,826

== Economy ==
Ottendorf-Okrilla has about 6,500 jobs in about 700 companies. It is also the location of the letter processing center of the Deutsche Post for the Dresden area.
