= Wachau, Saxony =

Wachau
- Municipality
- Coat of arms

- Location of Wachau within Bautzen district
- Interactive map of Wachau
- Location within Germany Location within Saxony
- Coordinates: 51°9′36″N 13°54′14″E
- Country: Germany
- State: Saxony
- District: Bautzen
- Subdivisions: 5

Government
  - Mayor (2022–29): Veit Künzelmann (CDU)

Area
  - Total: 38.11 km^{2} (14.71 sq mi)
- Elevation: 223 m (732 ft)

Population (2025-12-31)
  - Total: 4,226
  - Density: 110.9/km^{2} (287.2/sq mi)
- Time zone: UTC+01:00 (CET)
  - Summer (DST): UTC+02:00 (CEST)
- Postal codes: 01454
- Dialling codes: 03528, 035205
- Vehicle registration: BZ, BIW, HY, KM
- Website: www.wachau.de

Wachau (German: [ˈvaxaʊ]; Upper Sorbian: Wachow [ˈwaxɔf]) is a municipality in the district of Bautzen in Saxony, Germany.
