= List of 1960s musical artists =

Popular music artists of the decade

A list of musical groups and artists who were active in the 1960s and associated with music in the decade:

== A ==
- ? & The Mysterians
- The 13th Floor Elevators
- 1910 Fruitgum Company
- 3's a Crowd
- The 31st of February
- A Passing Fancy
- Aaron Neville
- Ace Cannon
- The Action
- Adam Faith
- Adam Wade
- The Ad Libs
- Adge Cutler
- The Aerovons
- Agincourt
- Alan Price
- Albert Collins
- Al Green
- Al Hirt
- Al Kooper
- Al Martino
- Albert King
- Alice Cooper
- The Allman Brothers Band
- The Allman Joys
- Alma Cogan
- Alvin and the Chipmunks
- The Amboy Dukes
- Ambrose Slade
- Amen Corner
- The American Breed
- The Ames Brothers
- Amon Düül II
- The Andrew Oldham Orchestra
- Andromeda
- Andy Kim
- Andy Stewart (musician)
- Andy Williams
- The Angels
- The Animals
- Anita Bryant
- The Anita Kerr Singers
- Annette Funicello
- Ann-Margret
- Apple
- The Applejacks
- April Wine
- Archie Bell & the Drells
- The Archies
- Aretha Franklin
- Arlo Guthrie
- Art
- Arthur Lyman
- Arthur Alexander
- Arthur Conley
- The Artwoods
- Asha Bhosle
- The Association
- The Atlantics
- The Attack
- The Avant-Garde
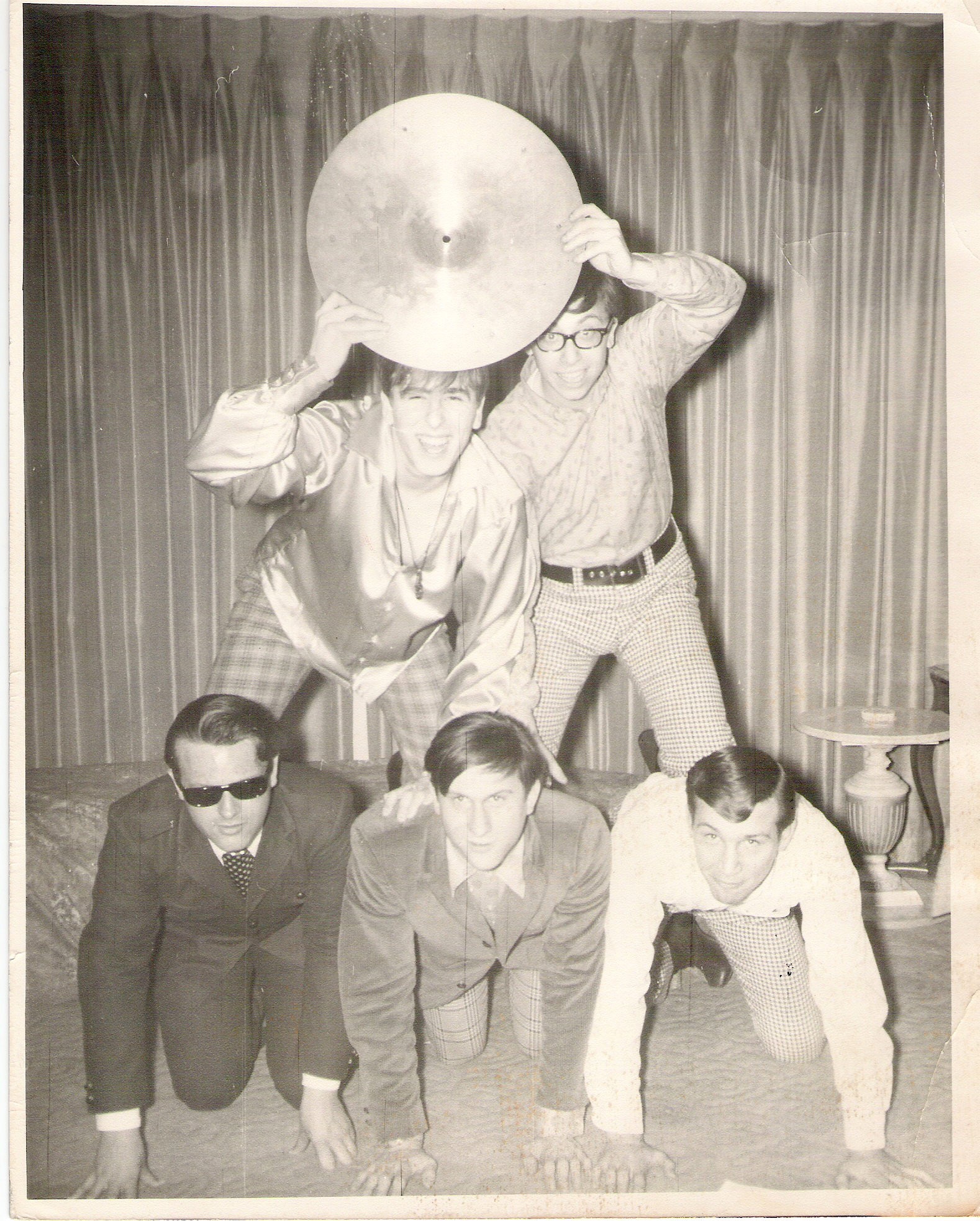
1910 Fruitgum Company

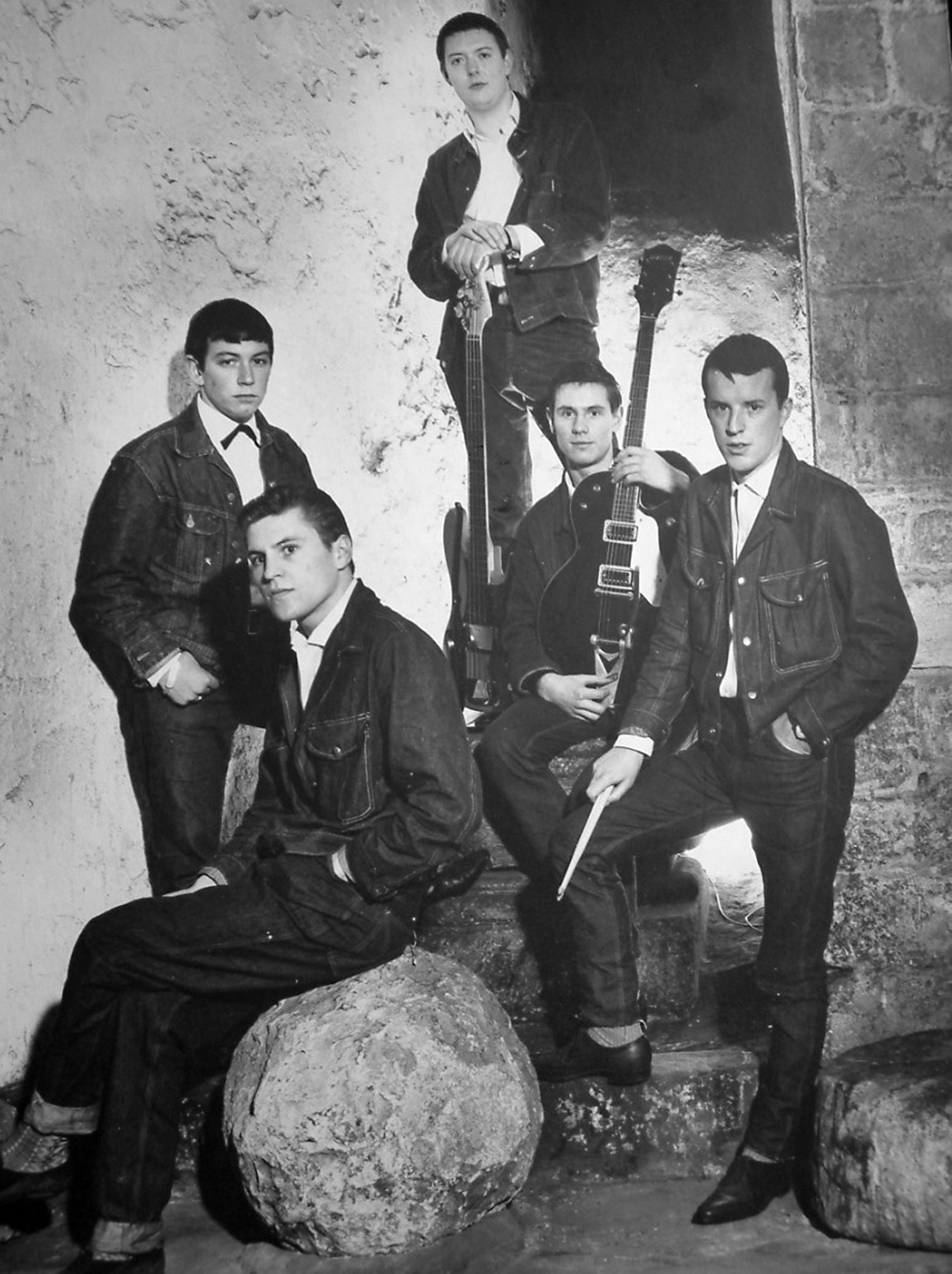
The Animals

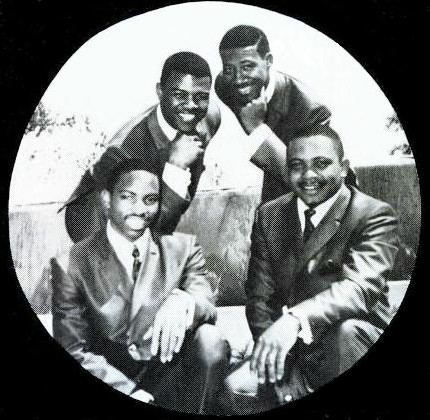
Archie Bell & the Drells

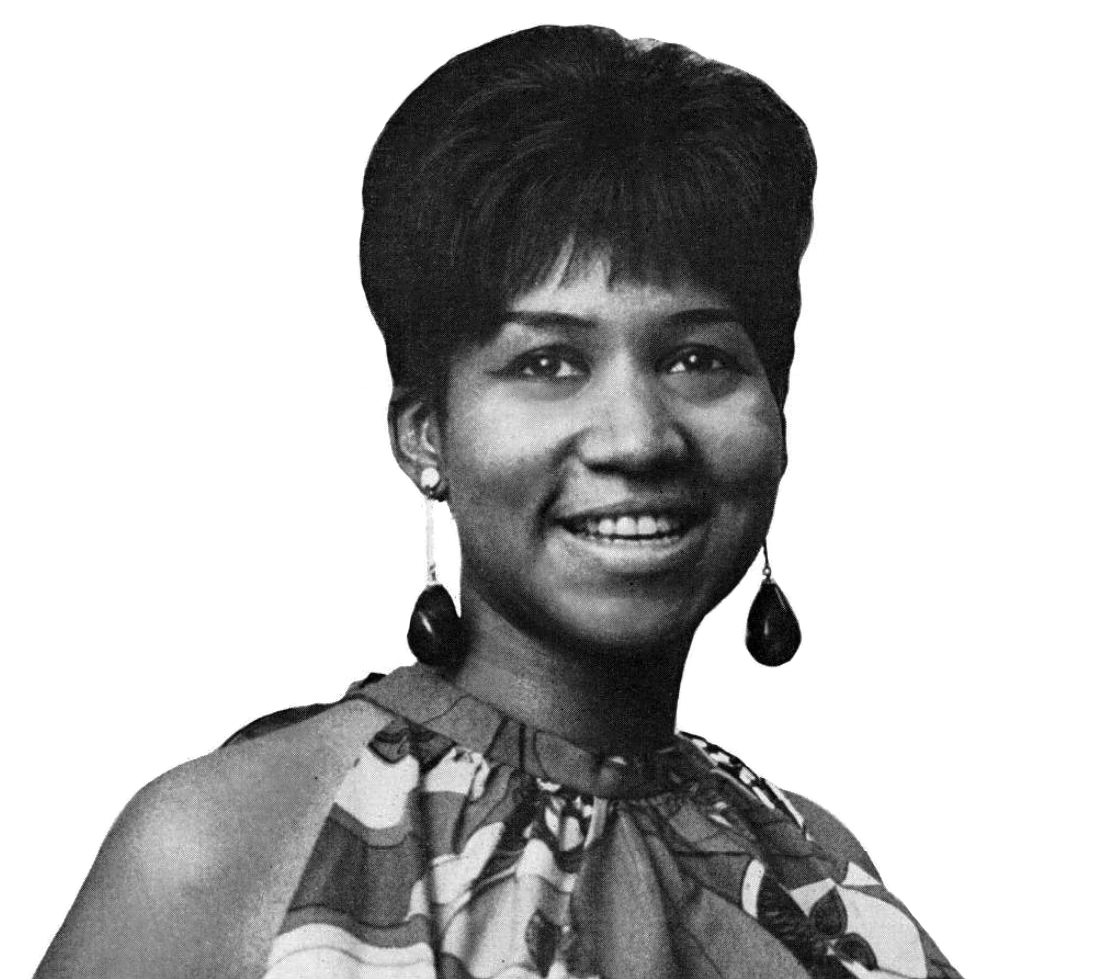
Aretha Franklin

== B ==
- Baby Washington
- B.B. King
- B. Bumble and the Stingers
- Bachdenkel
- The Bachelors
- Badfinger
- The Balloon Farm
- The Banana Splits
- The Band
- A Band of Angels
- Band of Joy
- Bangor Flying Circus
- Barbara Acklin
- Barbara George
- Barbara Lewis
- Barbara Lynn
- Barbara Mason
- Barbra Streisand
- The Barbarians
- Barclay James Harvest
- The Bar-Kays
- Barney Kessel
- Barrett Strong
- The Barron Knights
- Barry & the Tamerlanes
- Barry McGuire
- Barry Ryan
- Barry Sadler
- The Beach Boys
- Beacon Street Union
- The Beatles
- The Beau Brummels
- Beaver & Krause
- Bee Gees
- Ben E. King
- Bent Fabric
- Bert Kaempfert
- Bert Sommer
- Bettye Swann
- Betty Everett
- Beverley Martyn
- Big Brother and the Holding Company
- Big Dee Irwin
- Big Joe Turner
- The Big Three
- Bill Anderson
- Bill Black's Combo
- Bill Evans
- Bill Haley & His Comets
- Bill Pursell
- Billie Davis
- Billy J. Kramer
- Billy Joe Royal
- Billy Fury
- Billy Preston
- Billy Stewart
- Billy Vaughn
- Bing Crosby
- The Birds
- The Birdwatchers
- B.J. Thomas
- Blind Faith
- Blodwyn Pig
- Blood, Sweat & Tears
- Blossom Toes
- The Blossoms
- Blue Cheer
- Blue Mink
- Blues Creation
- The Blues Image
- Blues Incorporated
- Blues Magoos
- Blues Project
- The Bobbettes
- Bob B. Soxx & the Blue Jeans
- The Bob Crewe Generation
- Bo Diddley
- Bob Dylan
- Bob Luman
- Bob Marley & the Wailers
- Bob Seger
- Bobbie Gentry
- Bobby "Blue" Bland
- Bobby "Boris" Pickett
- Bobby Darin
- Bobby Freeman
- The Bobby Fuller Four
- Bobby Goldsboro
- Bobby Hebb
- Bobby Lewis
- Bobby Moore & the Rhythm Aces
- Bobby Rydell
- Bobby Sherman
- Bobby Vee
- Bobby Vinton
- Bobby Womack/Valentinos
- Bodast
- Bonzo Dog Doo-Dah Band
- The Boogie Kings
- Booker T. & The MG's
- Boots Randolph
- The Box Tops
- Boyce and Hart
- The Boys
- The Braillettes
- Los Bravos
- Brenda Holloway
- Brenda Lee
- Brenton Wood
- Brett Marvin and the Thunderbolts
- Brewer & Shipley
- Brian Auger and the Trinity
- Brian Hyland
- The Brogues
- Brook Benton
- The Brooklyn Bridge
- The Brothers Four
- The Browns
- Bruce & Terry
- Bruce Channel
- Brutus
- Bubble Puppy
- The Buckinghams
- Buck Owens
- Buddy Guy
- Budgie
- Buffalo Springfield
- Buffy St. Marie
- The Buggs
- Bull & the Matadors
- Bunny Sigler
- Burt Bacharach
- Burton Cummings
- Buster Brown
- Buzz Clifford
- The Byrds
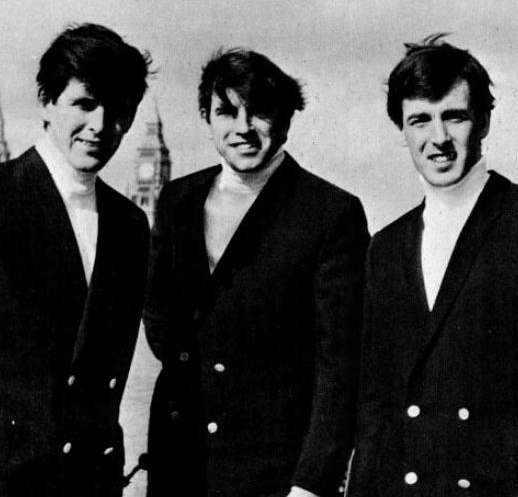
The Bachelors

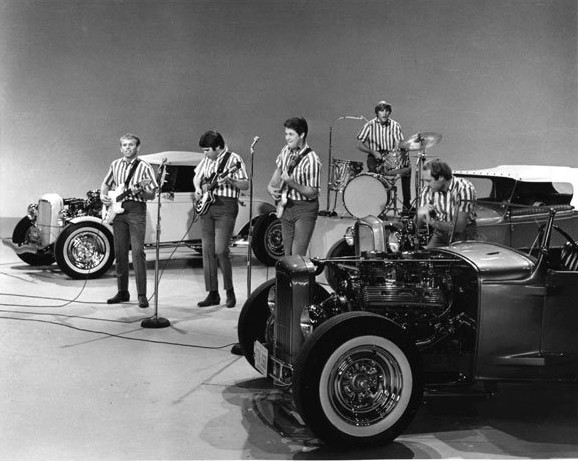
The Beach Boys

The Beatles

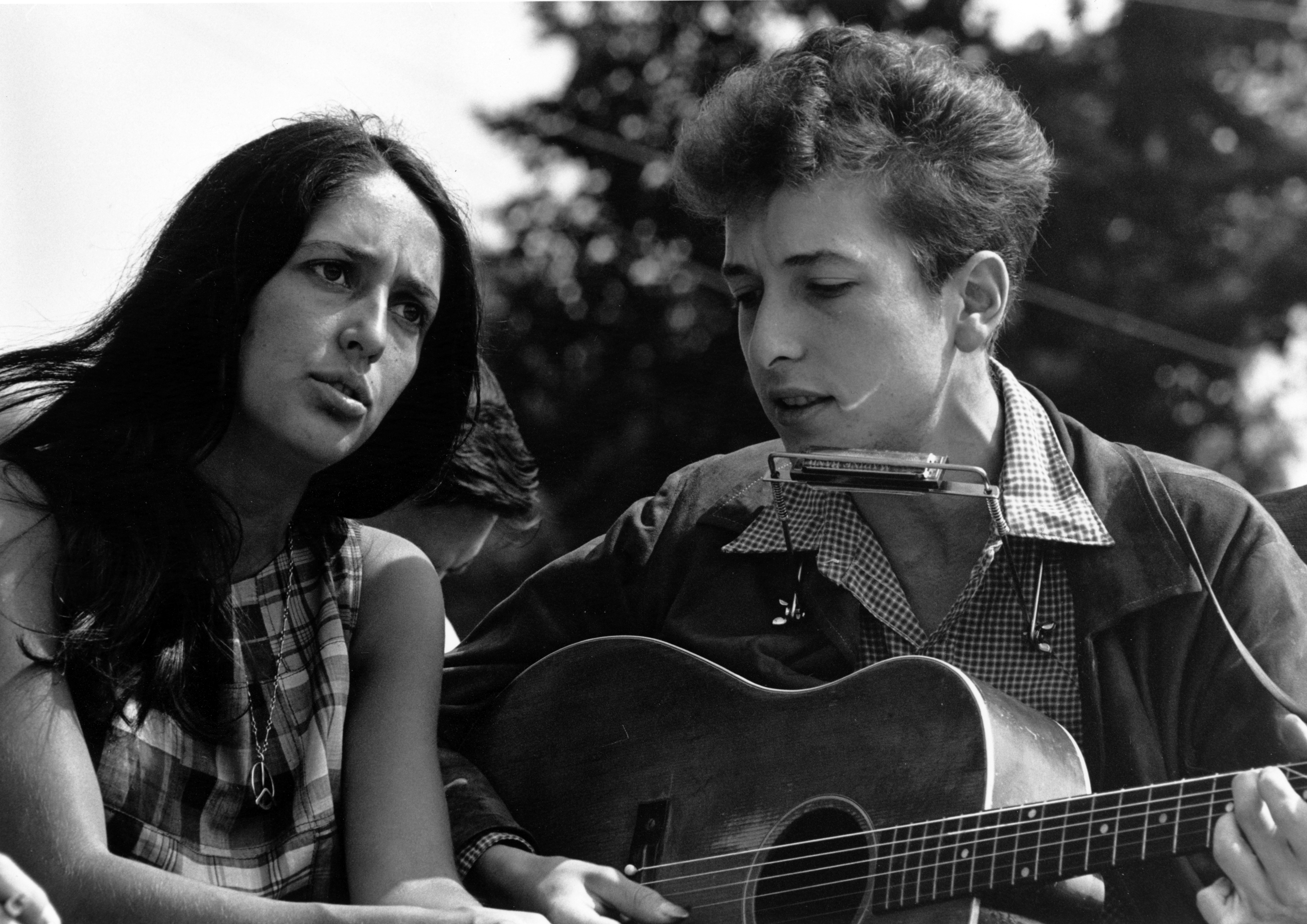
Bob Dylan

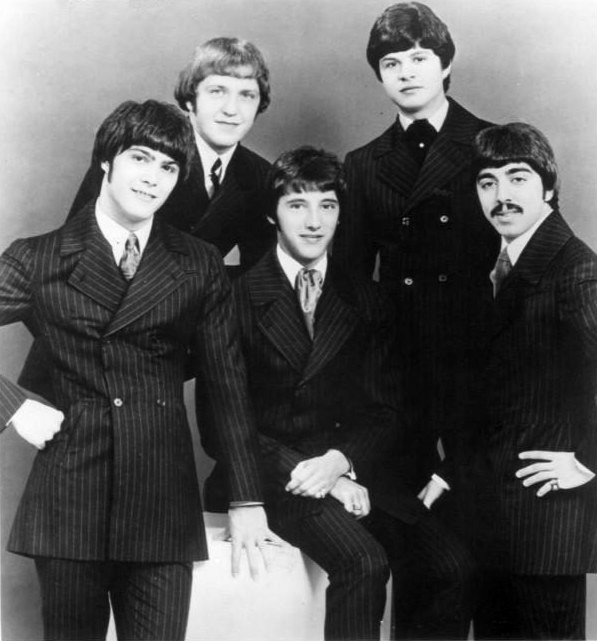
The Buckinghams

== C ==
- The Cake
- The Canadian Sweethearts
- Canned Heat
- Cannibal & the Headhunters
- The Capitols
- Captain Beefheart
- Caravan
- The Caravelles
- Carla Thomas
- Carlos Santana
- Carole King
- The Carpenters
- Carl Perkins
- Carter-Lewis and the Southerners
- Cartoone
- The Cascades
- The Casinos
- The Castaways
- The Castells
- Cat Mother & the All Night Newsboys
- Cat Stevens
- Cathy Carroll
- Chad & Jeremy
- Chad Mitchell Trio
- Charlie Rich
- Chairmen of the Board
- The Chambers Brothers
- The Champs
- The Chantays
- The Chantels
- The Charlatans
- Charles Mingus
- Charles Wright & the Watts 103rd Street Rhythm Band
- The Chartbusters
- Checkmates, Ltd.
- Chet Atkins
- Chicago
- Chicago Loop
- Chicken Shack
- The Chiffons
- The Chimes
- The Chocolate Watchband
- The Choir
- Chris Andrews
- Chris Montez
- Chubby Checker
- Chuck Berry
- Chuck Israels
- Chuck Jackson
- The Churchills
- Cilla Black
- Circus Maximus
- Clarence Carter
- Clarence "Frogman" Henry
- Classics IV
- Claude King
- Claudine Longet
- Clear Light
- The Cleftones
- Cliff Bennett and the Rebel Rousers
- Cliff Nobles
- Cliff Richard
- Climax Blues Band
- The Clique
- Clouds
- Clubsound
- Clyde McPhatter
- The Coasters
- Cold Blood
- The Collectors
- The Comfortable Chair
- Connie Francis
- Connie Stevens
- The Contours
- Conway Twitty
- The Cookies
- The Corsairs
- Count Five
- Country Joe and the Fish
- Coven
- The Cowsills
- Crazy Elephant
- The Crazy World of Arthur Brown
- Cream
- The Creation
- Creedence Clearwater Revival
- The Crests
- Crispian St. Peters
- The Critters
- Crosby, Stills, Nash & Young
- Crow
- The Crusaders
- The Cryin' Shames
- The Crystals
- The Cuff Links
- Cupid's Inspiration
- Curtis Lee
- Cyrus Faryar
- The Cyrkle
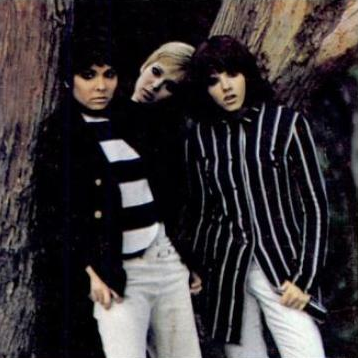
The Cake

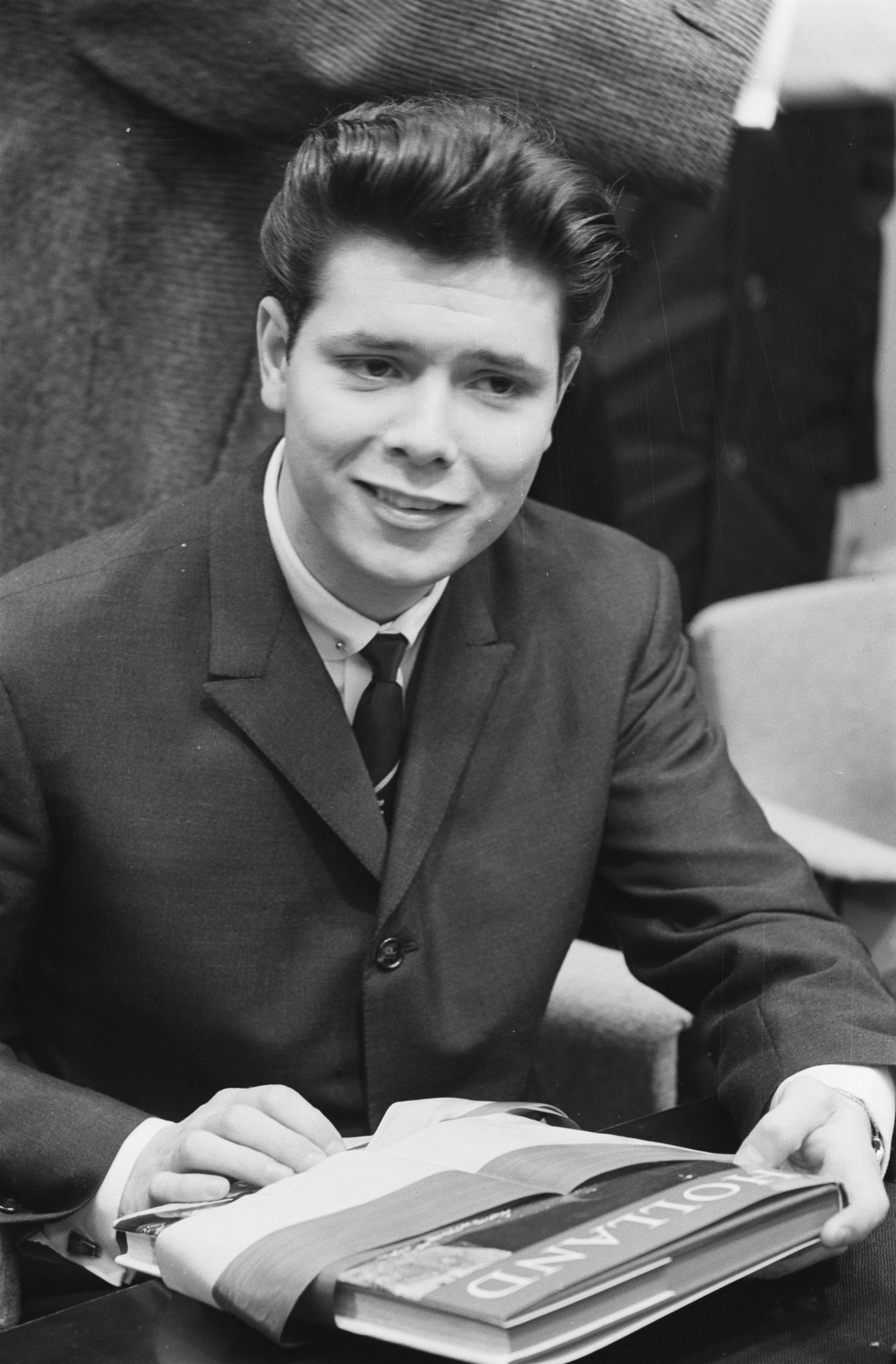
Cliff Richard

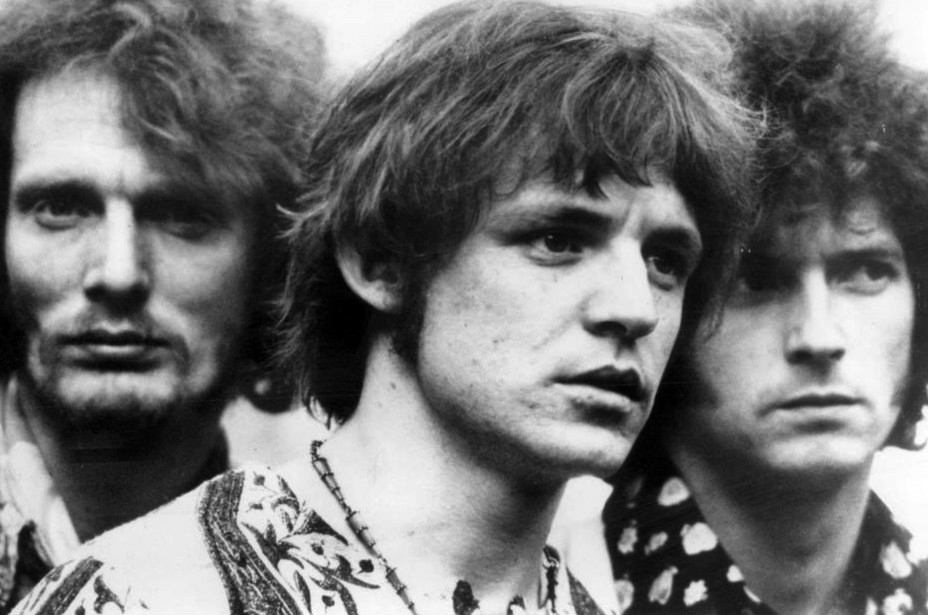
Cream

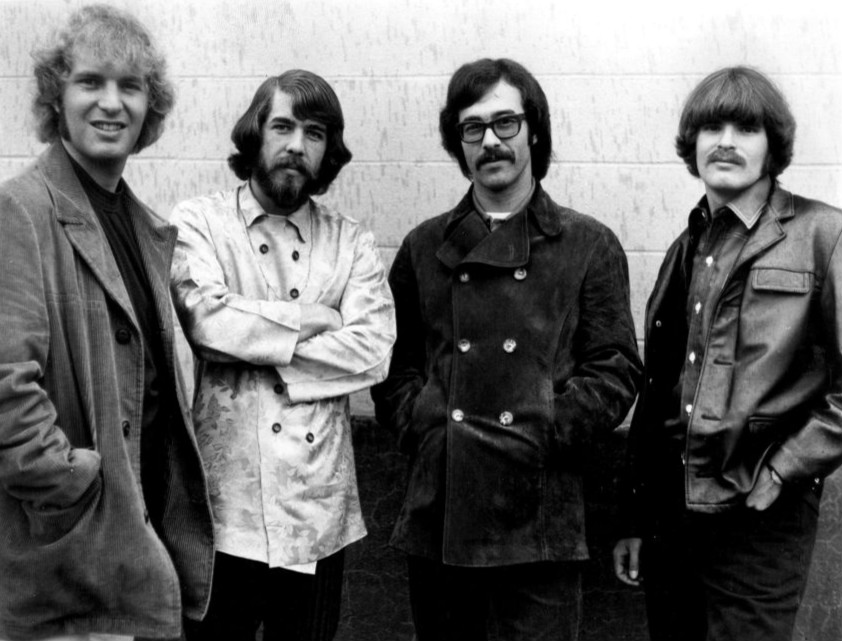
Creedence Clearwater Revival

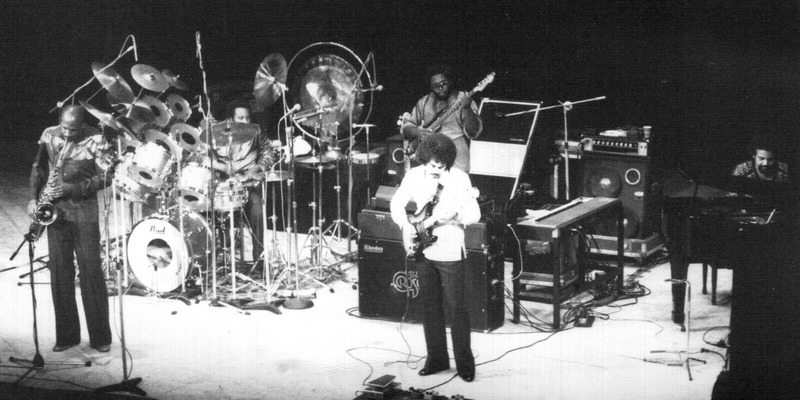
The Crusaders

== D ==
- The Dakotas
- Danny & the Juniors
- Danny Diaz & The Checkmates
- Danny and The Velaires
- Darlene Love
- The Dartells
- Dave "Baby" Cortez
- Dave Berry
- Dave Brubeck
- The Dave Clark Five
- Dave Dee, Dozy, Beaky, Mick & Tich
- David & Jonathan
- David Bowie
- David Rose
- David Ruffin
- David Houston
- Davie Allan & The Arrows
- The Deakins
- Dean Martin
- Dee Clark
- Dee Dee Sharp
- Dee Dee Warwick
- Deep Purple
- Delaney & Bonnie
- The Delfonics
- Delivery
- The Dells
- Del Shannon
- The Del-Vetts
- Kurt Demmler
- Deon Jackson
- Desmond Dekker & the Aces
- The Devotions
- Dexter Gordon
- Diana Ross
- Diane Renay
- Dick & Dee Dee
- Dick Dale
- Dickey Lee
- Dinah Washington
- Dino, Desi & Billy
- Dion & the Belmonts
- Dionne Warwick
- The Dixiebelles
- The Dixie Cups
- The Dixie Nightingales
- The D-Men
- Dobie Gray
- Don Covay
- Don Fardon
- Donovan
- Doodletown Pipers
- The Doors
- Doris Day
- Doris Troy
- Dorsey Burnette
- The Dovells
- Downliners Sect
- The Drifters
- Dr. John
- Dr. Strangely Strange
- Dr. West's Medicine Show and Junk Band
- Duane Eddy
- Duke Ellington
- The Duprees
- Dusty Springfield
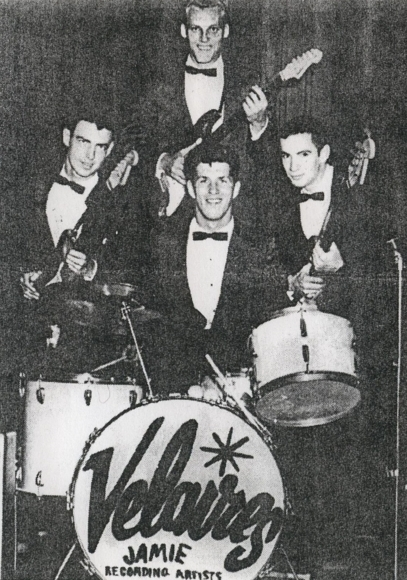
Danny and The Velaires

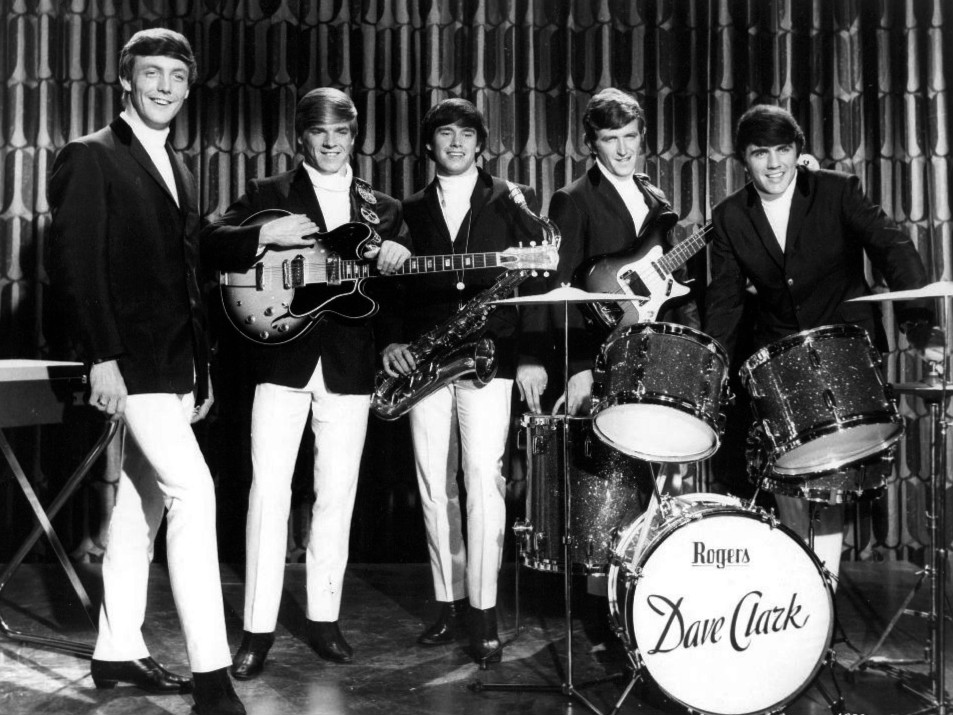
The Dave Clark Five

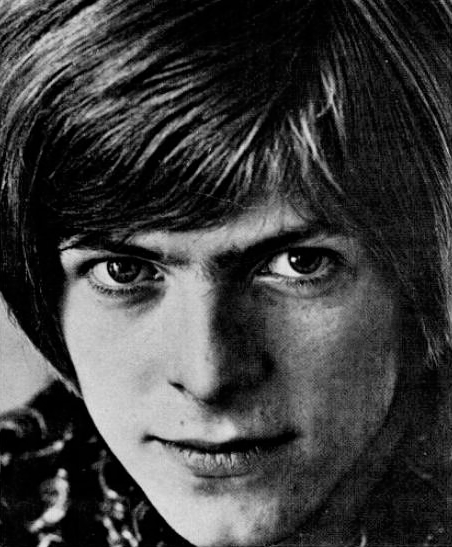
David Bowie

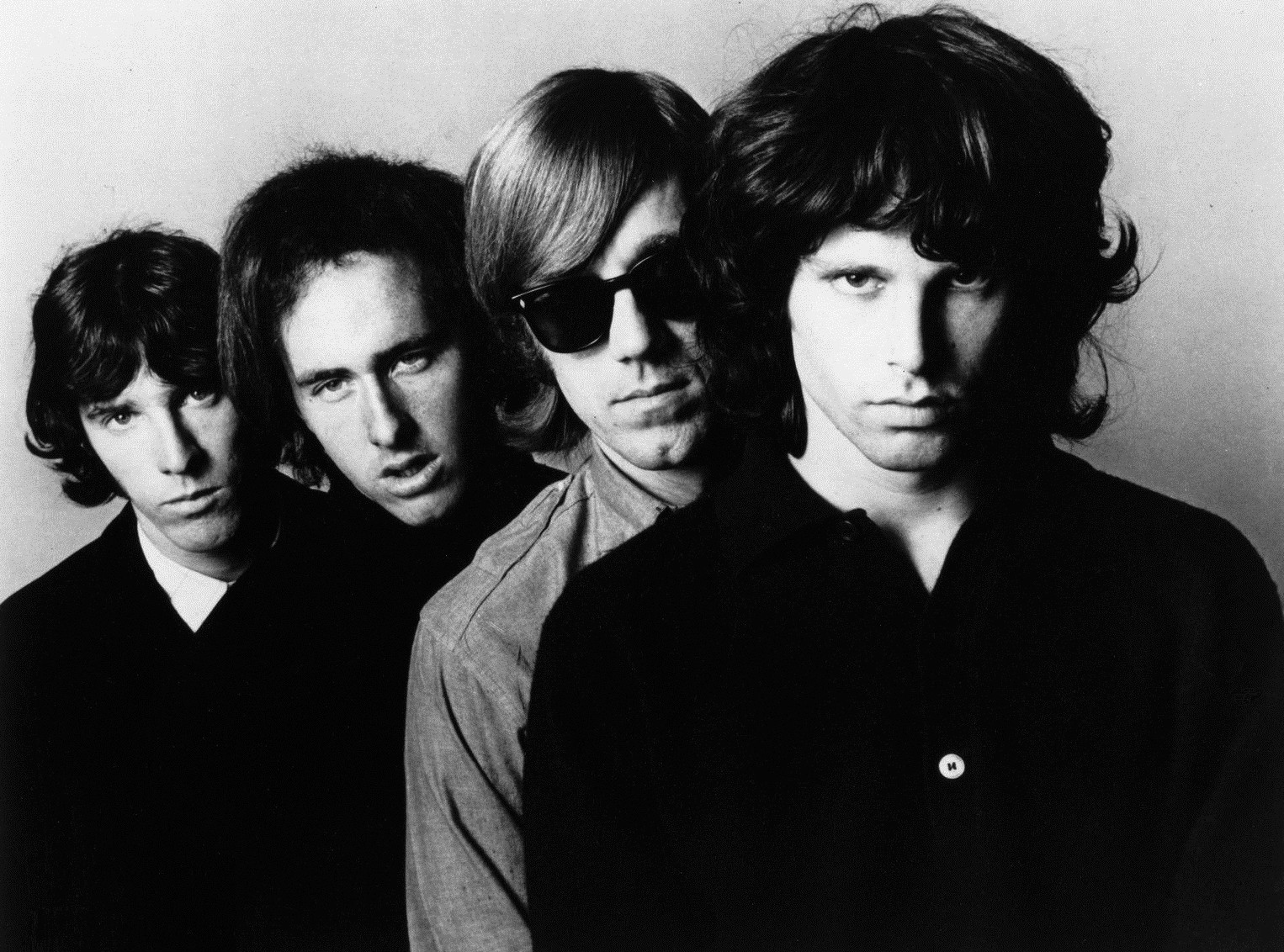
The Doors

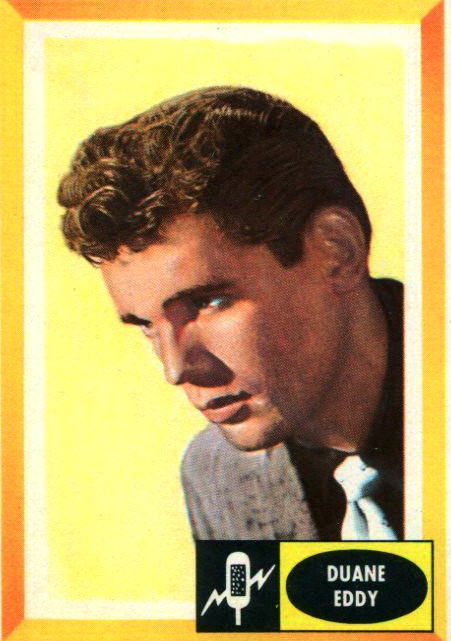
Duane Eddy

== E ==
- The Eagles (UK band)
- The Earls
- Earth Opera
- The Easybeats
- The Echoes
- Eclection
- Ed Ames
- Eddie & the Showmen
- Eddie Cochran
- Eddie Fisher
- Eddie Floyd
- Eddie Hodges
- Eddie Holman
- Edgar Broughton Band
- Edgar Winter
- Edwin Hawkins
- Edwin Starr
- Egg
- Eire Apparent
- El Tri
- The Electric Flag
- The Electric Indian
- The Electric Prunes
- The Elgins
- Ella Fitzgerald
- Elmore James
- Elton John
- Elvis Presley
- Emile Ford
- The End
- Engelbert Humperdinck
- Ennio Morricone
- Episode Six
- The Equals
- Ernie Maresca
- The Escorts
- The Esquires
- The Essex
- Esther Phillips
- Etta James
- Euphoria
- Even Dozen Jug Band
- The Everly Brothers
- Every Mother's Son
- The Exciters
- Eydie Gormé
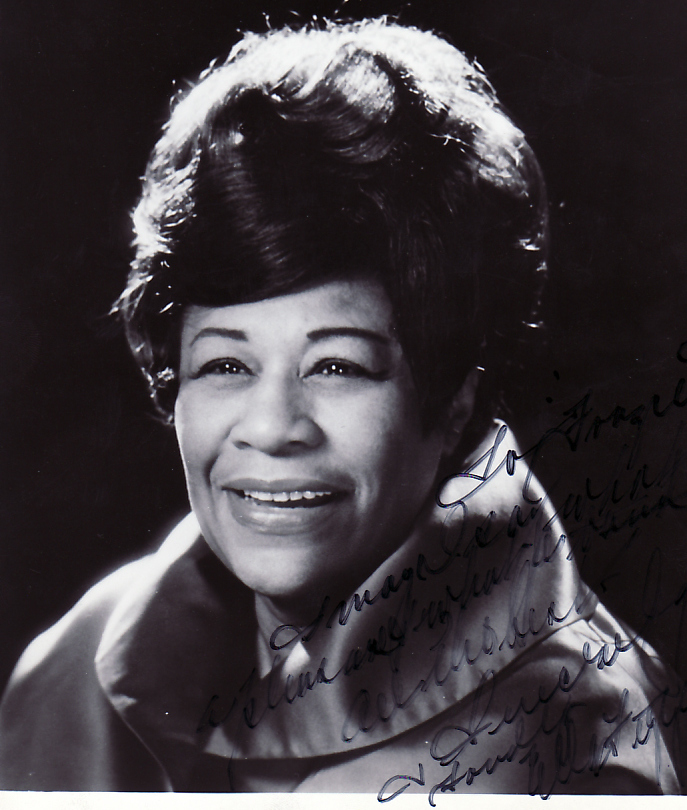
Ella Fitzgerald

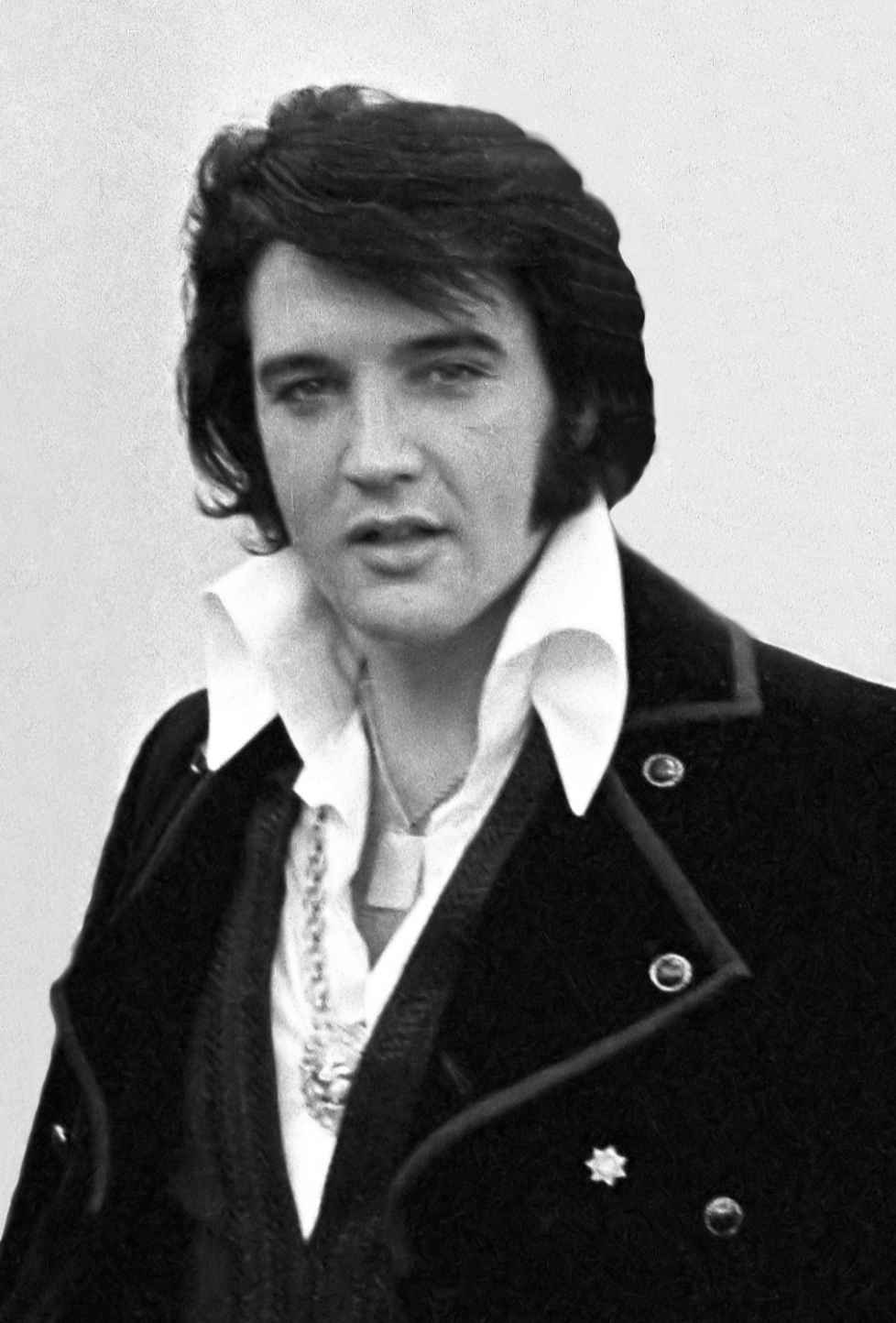
Elvis Presley

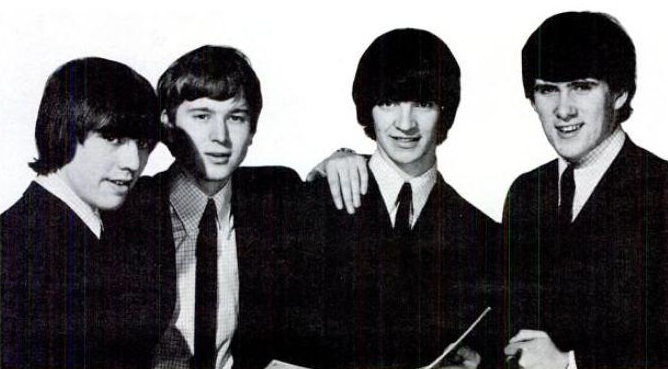
The Escorts

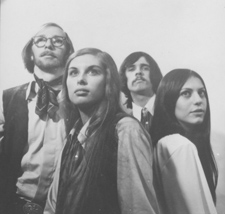
Euphoria

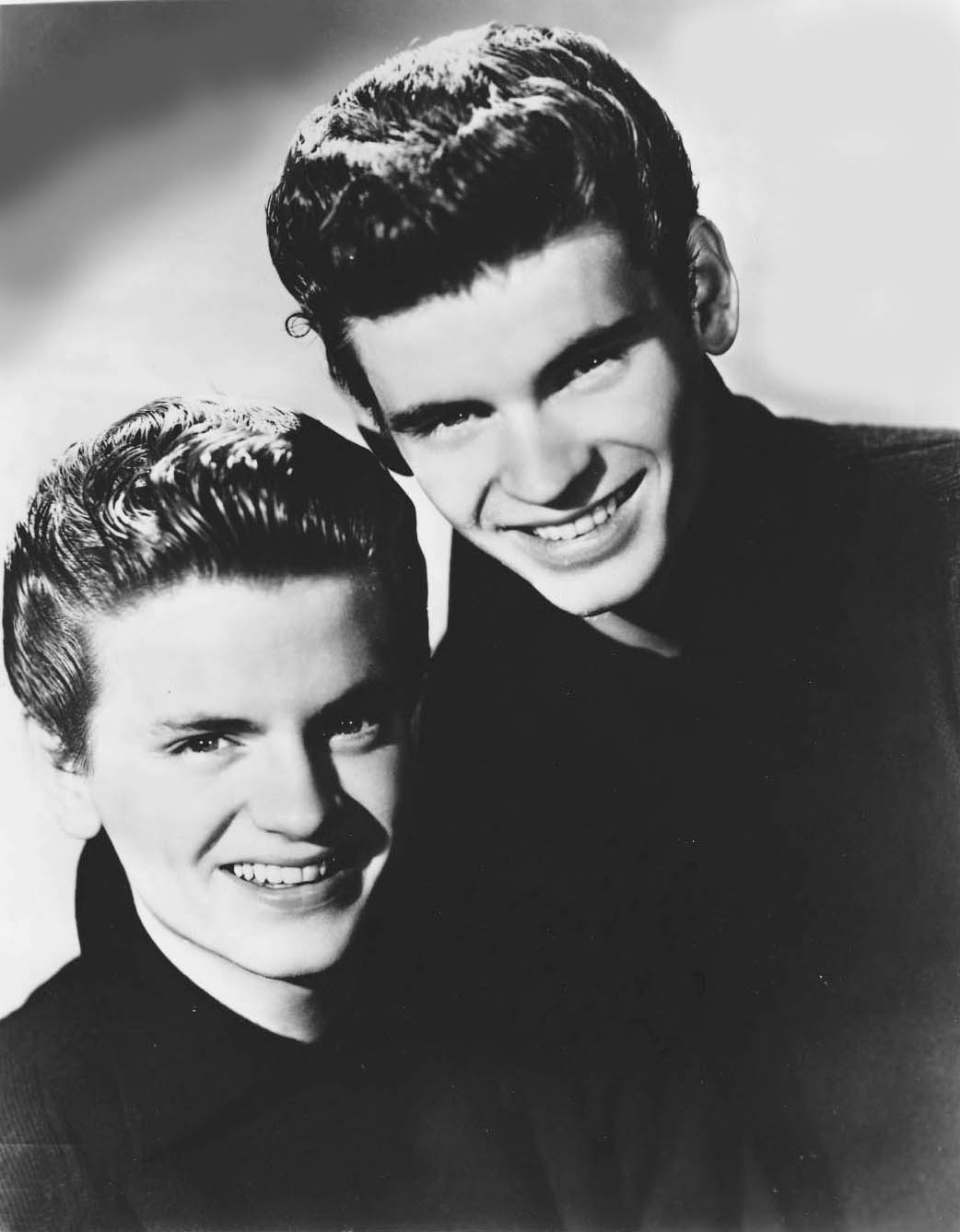
The Everly Brothers

== F ==
- The Faces
- Fairport Convention
- The Falcons
- Family
- The Family Dogg
- Fats Domino
- Fear Itself
- The Fendermen
- Ferrante & Teicher
- Fever Tree
- The Fifth Dimension
- The Fifth Estate
- Fifty Foot Hose
- Fire
- The Fireballs
- The First Edition
- Five Americans
- The Flames
- The Flamin' Groovies
- Flaming Youth
- The Flamingos
- Fleetwood Mac
- The Fleetwoods
- Les Fleur de Lys
- The Flirtations
- Floyd Cramer
- The Flower Pot Men
- The Flying Burrito Brothers
- The Flying Circus
- The Flying Machine
- The Fontane Sisters
- Fontella Bass
- The Fortunes
- The Foundations
- The Four Freshmen
- The Four Pennies
- The Four Preps
- The Four Seasons
- The Four Tops
- The Fourmost
- Frank Ifield
- Frank Sinatra
- Frank Zappa
- Frankie Avalon
- Frankie Lymon & the Teenagers
- Fraternity of Man
- Freddie & the Dreamers
- Freddie Scott
- Freddy Cannon
- Freddy King
- Freddie Mack
- Free
- The Free Design
- The Freshmen
- Friend and Lover
- The Friends of Distinction
- Frijid Pink
- Max Frost and the Troopers
- The Frost
- Frumious Bandersnatch
- The Fugs
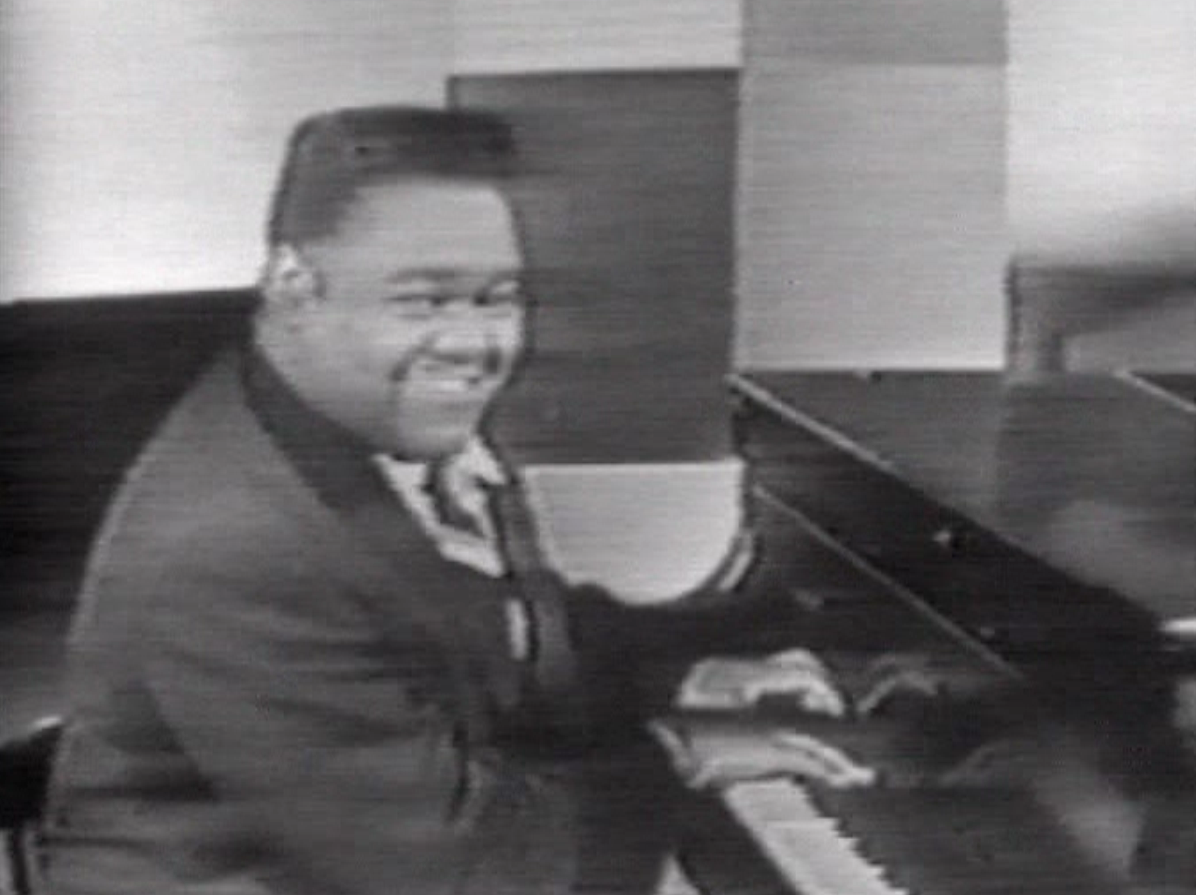
Fats Domino

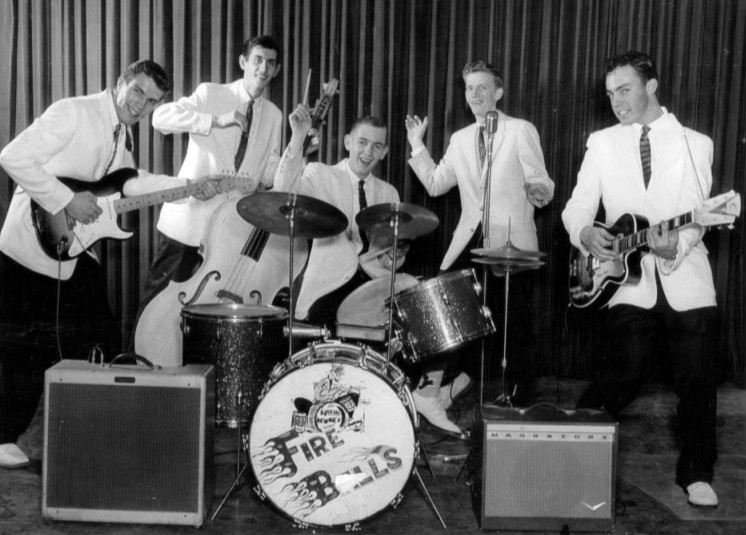
The Fireballs

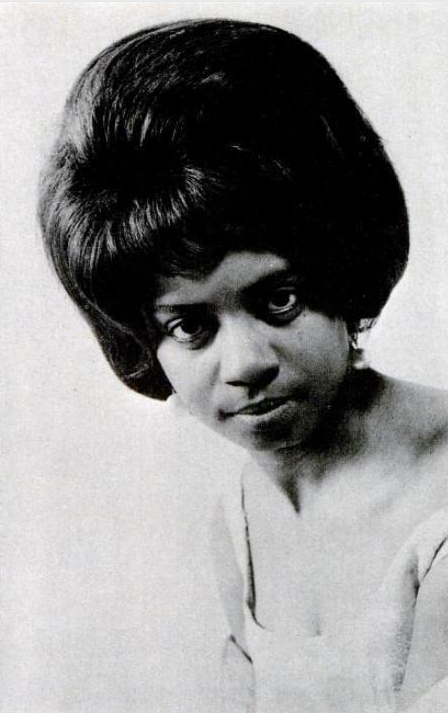
Fontella Bass

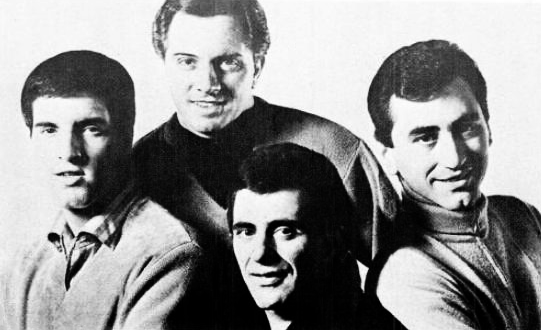
The Four Seasons

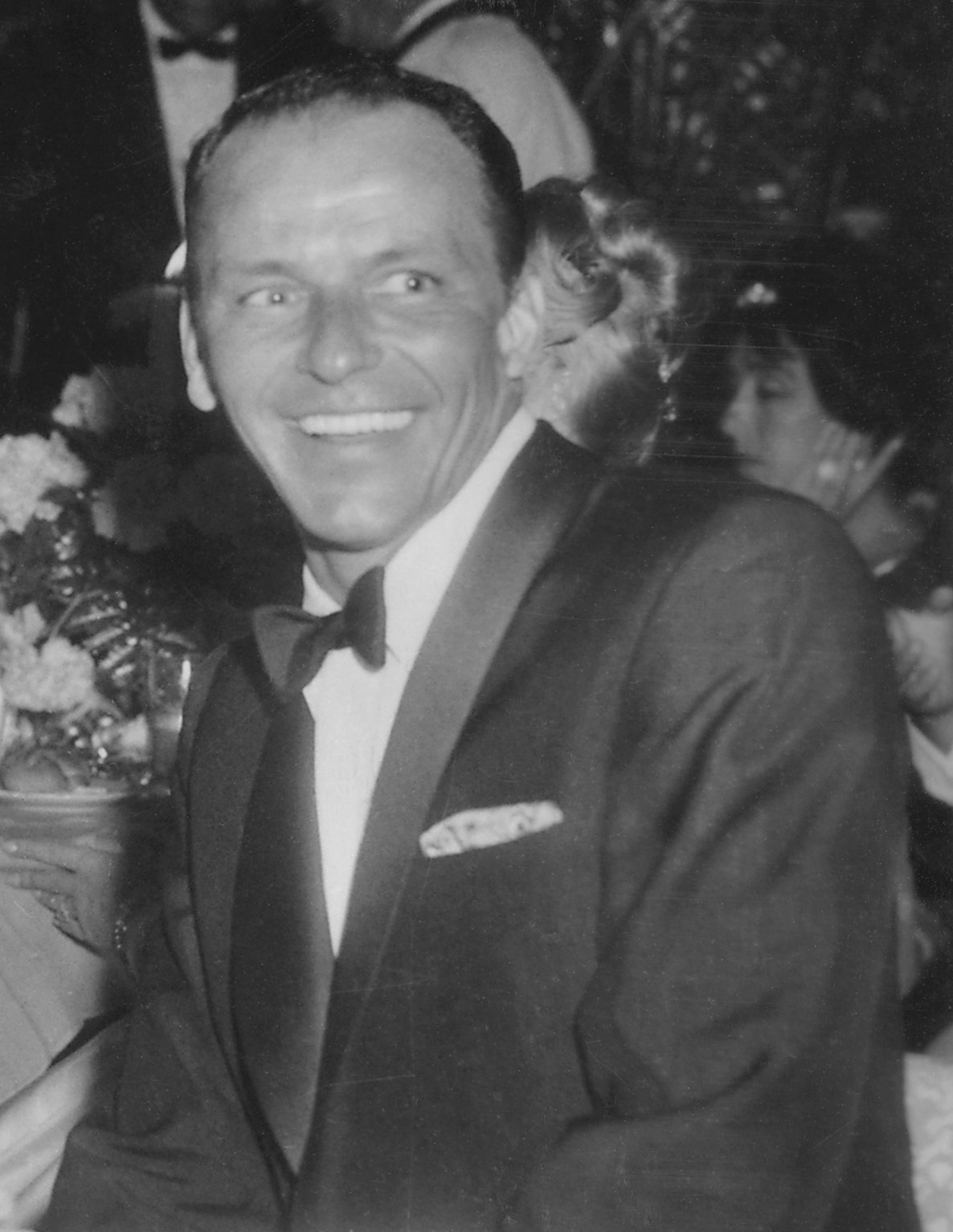
Frank Sinatra

== G ==
- Gale Garnett
- The Gants
- Garland Green
- Garnett Mimms & The Enchanters
- Garry Miles
- Gary and the Hornets
- Gary Lewis & the Playboys
- Gary Puckett & the Union Gap
- Gary U.S. Bonds
- Gene & Debbe
- Gene Chandler
- Gene McDaniels
- Gene Pitney
- Gene Vincent
- Genesis
- Geno Washington & The Ram Jam Band
- The Gentrys
- George Jones
- George Harrison
- Georgie Fame
- Gerry & The Pacemakers
- Giles, Giles and Fripp
- The Girls
- Gladys Knight & the Pips
- Glass Harp (band)
- Glen Campbell
- Glenn Yarbrough
- The Go-Go's
- The Godz
- The Goldebriars
- Golden Earring
- The Golliwogs
- Gong (band)
- Gordon Lightfoot
- Gran Coquivacoa
- Grand Funk Railroad
- Grant Green
- Grapefruit
- The Grass Roots
- The Grateful Dead
- The GTOs
- The Guess Who
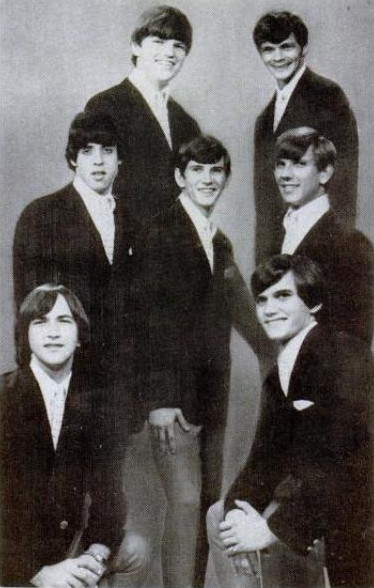
The Gentrys

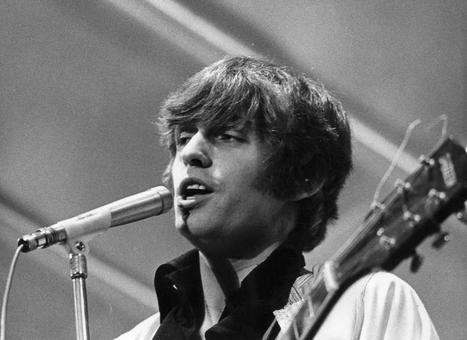
Georgie Fame

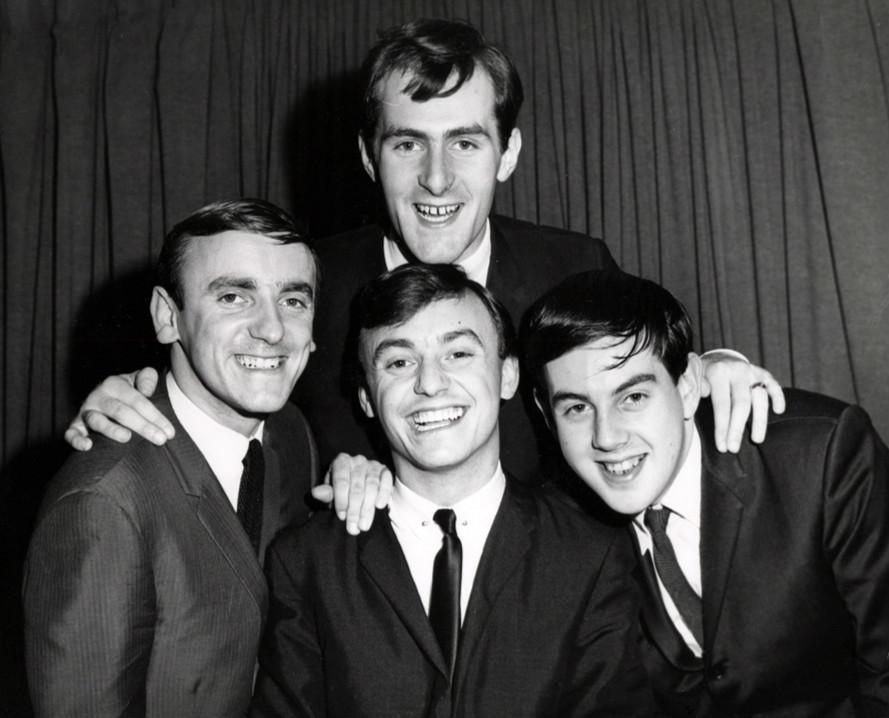
Gerry & The Pacemakers

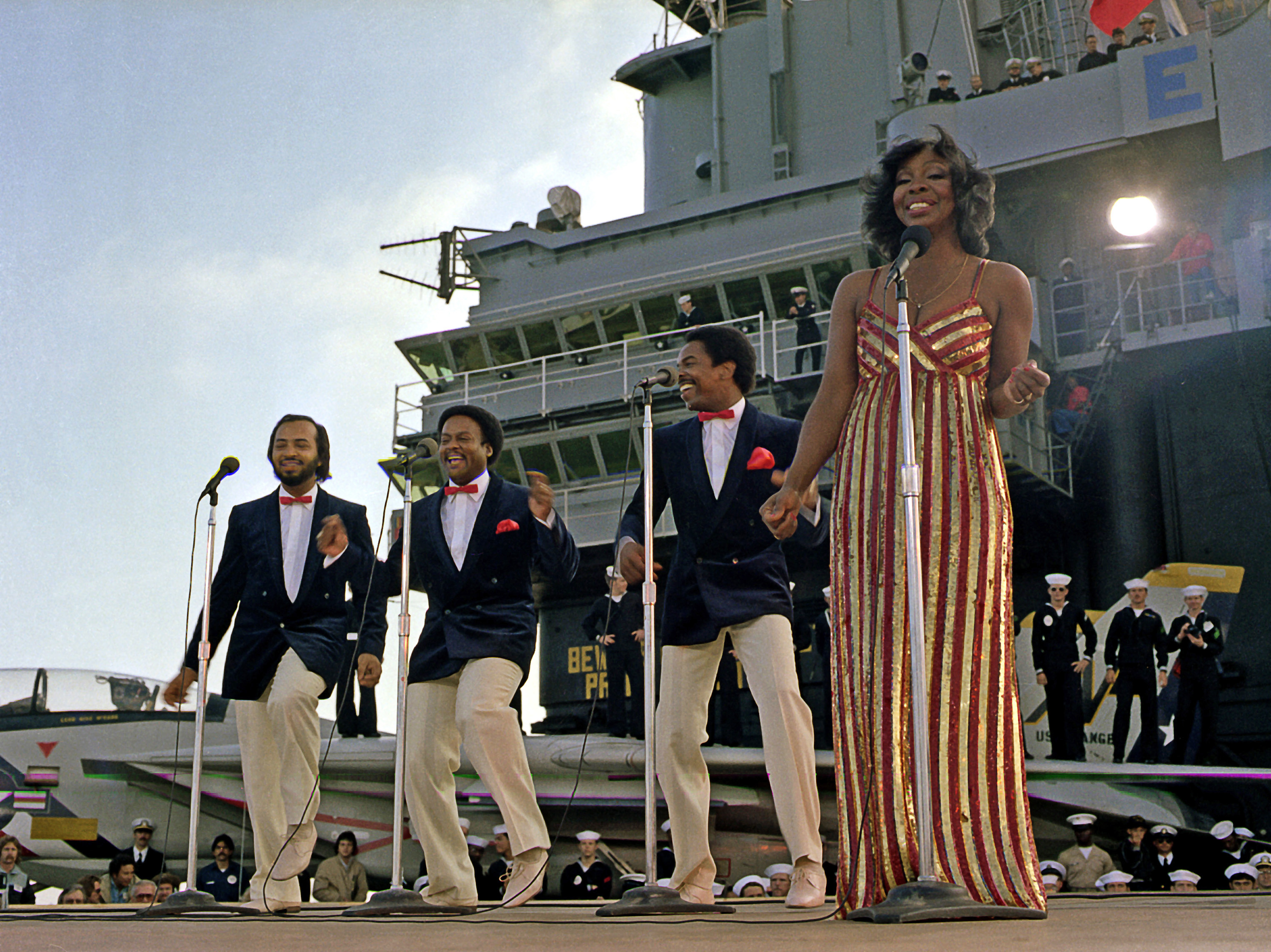
Gladys Knight & the Pips

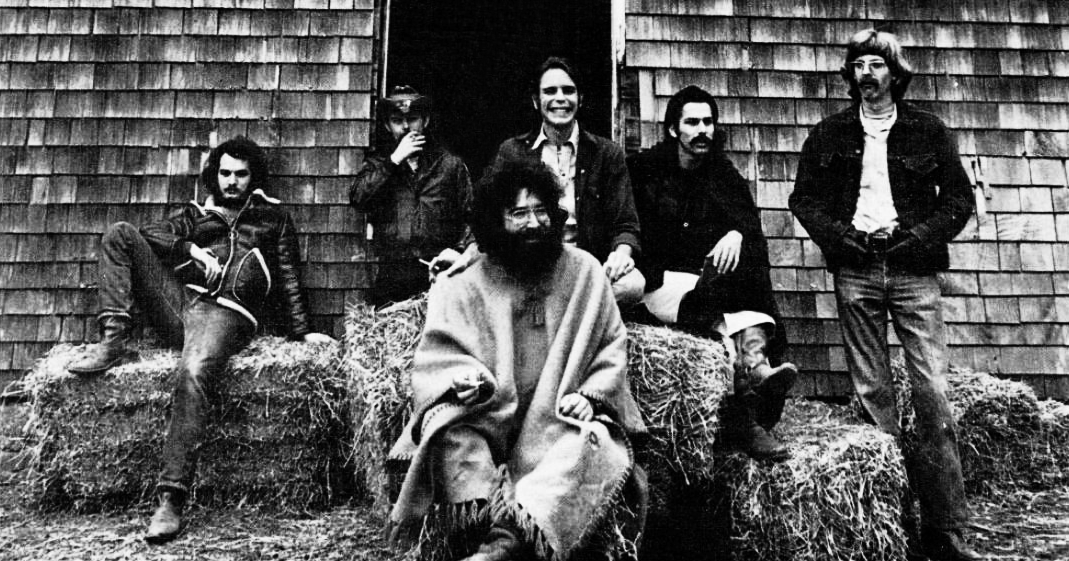
Grateful Dead

== H-J ==
- Hank Ballard & The Midnighters
- The Happenings
- Harpers Bizarre
- Harry Belafonte
- Harry Nilsson
- The Heard
- Helen Shapiro
- Henry Mancini
- Herb Alpert & The Tijuana Brass
- The Herd
- Herman's Hermits
- The Hesitations
- The Highwaymen
- The Holy Modal Rounders
- The Hollies
- The Hollywood Argyles
- Honeybus
- The Honeycombs
- Horst Jankowski
- Howard Tate
- Howlin' Wolf
- H.P. Lovecraft
- Hugh Masekela
- The Human Beinz
- Humble Pie
- Ian & Sylvia
- Ian Whitcomb
- Ike & Tina Turner
- The Ikettes
- The Impressions
- The Incredible String Band
- The Intruders
- The Irish Rovers
- Iron Butterfly
- Irma Thomas
- Isaac Bitton
- Isaac Hayes
- The Isley Brothers
- It's A Beautiful Day
- Ivory Joe Hunter
- The Ivy League
- J. Frank Wilson & the Cavaliers
- J.J. Jackson
- Jack Jones
- Jack Nitzsche
- Jackie DeShannon
- Jackie Ross
- Jackie Wilson
- The Jackson 5
- Jackson C. Frank
- James & Bobby Purify
- James Brown
- James Carr
- James Darren
- James Taylor
- Jan & Dean
- Jane Birkin/Serge Gainsbourg
- Janis Ian
- Janis Joplin
- Jay & the Americans
- Jay & the Techniques
- The Jaynetts
- Jeannie C. Riley
- The Jeff Beck Group
- Jefferson Airplane
- The Jelly Beans
- Jerry Butler
- Jerry Jeff Walker
- Jerry Lee Lewis
- Jerry Wallace
- Jethro Tull
- Jewel Akens
- Jim Hall
- Jim Reeves
- Jimi Hendrix/The Jimi Hendrix Experience
- Jimmy Clanton
- Jimmy Cliff
- Jimmy Hughes
- Jimmy Jones
- Jimmy McCracklin
- Jimmy Reed
- Jimmy Ruffin
- Jimmy Soul
- The Jive Five
- Joan Baez
- Joanie Sommers
- Joe Brown
- Joe Cocker
- Joe Dassin
- Joe Dolan
- Joe Dowell
- Joe Jones
- Joe Pass
- Joe Simon
- Joe South
- Joe Tex
- Joey Dee & The Starliters
- John Coltrane
- John Denver
- John P. Hammond
- John Leyton
- John D. Loudermilk
- John Fred
- John Lee Hooker
- John Fahey
- John Lennon
- John Mayall's Bluesbreakers
- John McLaughlin
- Johnnie Taylor
- Johnny Adams
- Johnny & the Hurricanes
- Johnny Burnette
- Johnny Cash
- Johnny Crawford
- Johnny Cymbal
- Johnny Horton
- Johnny Kidd & The Pirates
- Johnny Maestro & the Brooklyn Bridge
- Johnny Mathis
- Johnny Nash
- Johnny Preston
- Johnny Rivers
- Johnny Thunder
- Johnny Tillotson
- Johnny Winter
- John's Children
- Jonathan King
- Joni Mitchell
- Jose Feliciano
- Judy Collins
- Julie London
- Julie Rogers
- Junior Walker & The All-Stars
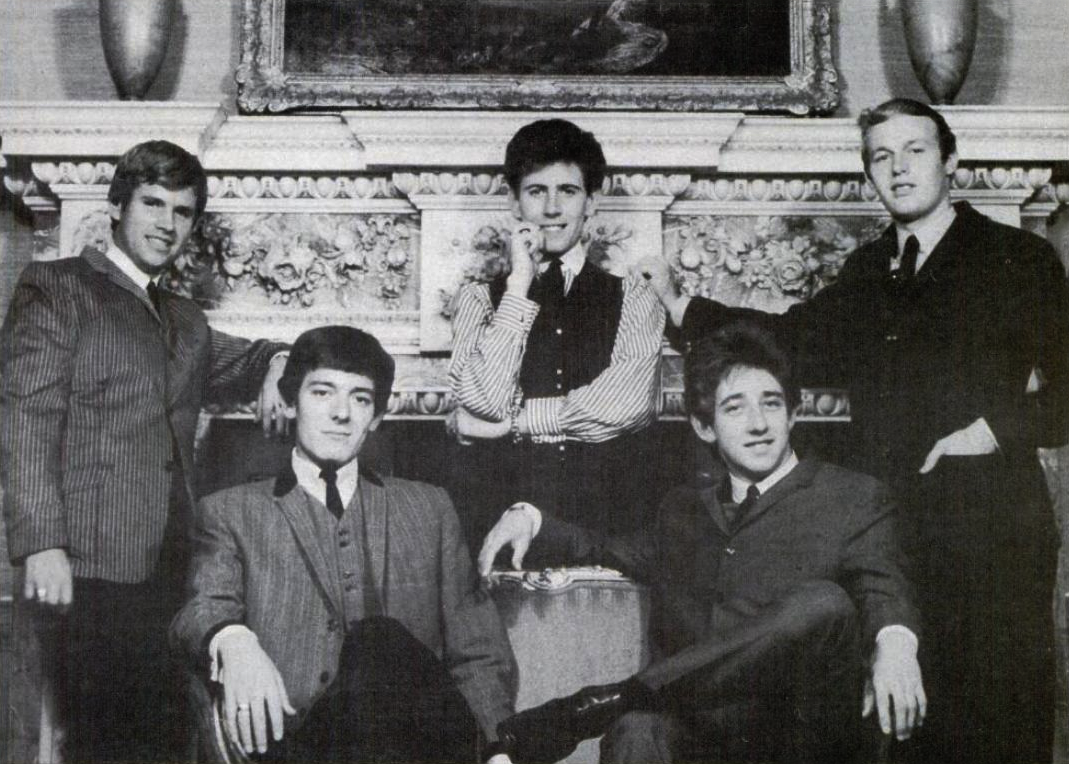
The Hollies

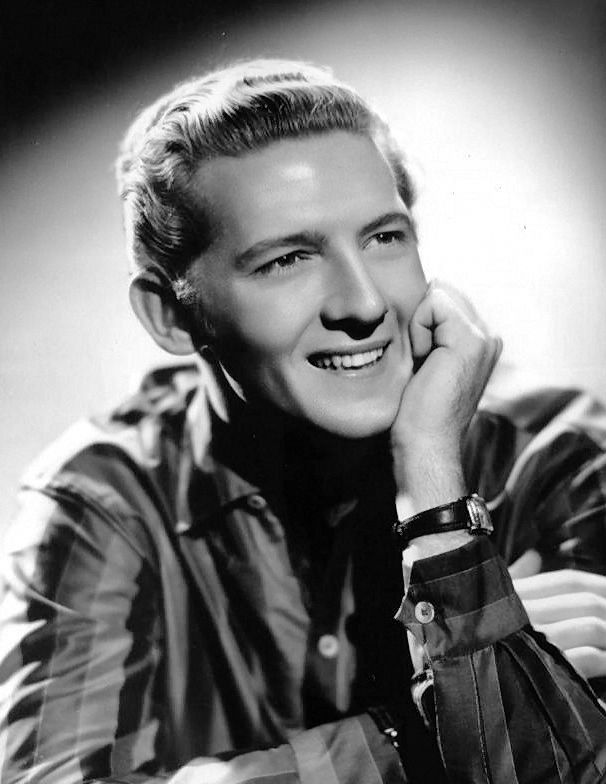
Jerry Lee Lewis

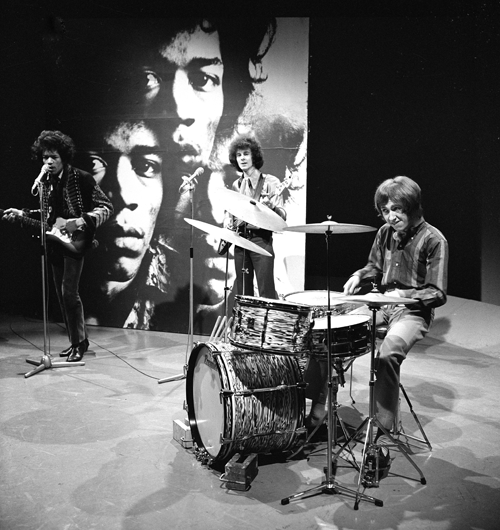
The Jimi Hendrix Experience

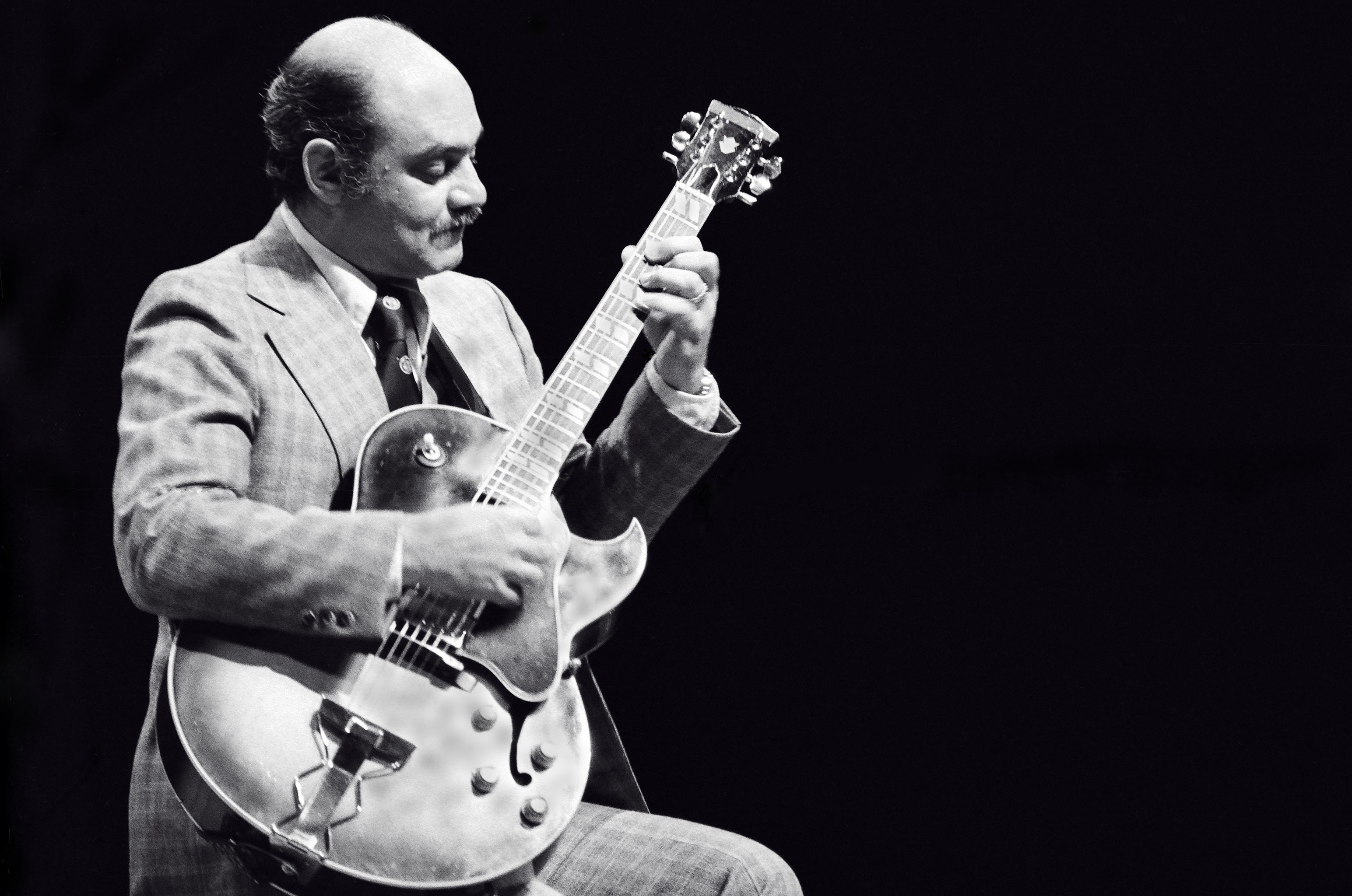
Joe Pass

== K-N ==
- Kai Winding
- Kaleidoscope
- Keef Hartley Band
- Keith
- Ken Dodd
- Kenny and the Kasuals
- Kenny Ball
- Kenny Rogers
- The Kim Sisters
- Kim Weston
- King Crimson
- King Curtis
- The Kingsmen
- Kingston Trio
- The Kinks
- Kishore Kumar
- The Knickerbockers
- Kyu Sakamoto
- Lainie Kazan
- Larry Bunker
- Larry Coryell
- Larry Norman
- Larry Verne
- Laura Nyro
- LaVern Baker
- The Leaves
- Led Zeppelin
- Lee Dorsey
- Lee Hazlewood
- The Left Banke
- The Lemon Pipers
- Len Barry
- Lennie Tristano
- Leon Russell
- Leonard Cohen
- The Lettermen
- Leroy Van Dyke
- Les Cooper & the Soul Rockers
- Lesley Gore
- The Limeliters
- Linda Ronstadt
- Linda Scott
- Link Wray
- Little Anthony & The Imperials
- Little Eva
- Little Richard
- Lloyd Price
- Long John Baldry
- Lonnie Donegan
- Lonnie Mack
- Lorraine Ellison
- Loretta Lynn
- Lotti Golden
- Lou Christie
- Lou Rawls
- Louis Armstrong
- Love
- Love Affair
- The Lovin' Spoonful
- Lulu
- Lynn Anderson
- Major Lance
- The Mamas & the Papas
- Manfred Mann
- The Manhattans
- Manna Dey
- The Marcels
- Marcie Blane
- Marianne Faithfull
- The Marketts
- The Mar-Keys
- The Marmalade
- Martha & The Vandellas
- Marty Robbins
- Marty Wilde
- The Marvelettes
- Marvin Gaye
- Marv Johnson
- Mary Hopkin
- Mary Wells
- Mashmakhan
- Mason Williams
- Matt Monro
- Maurice Williams & The Zodiacs
- Maxine Brown
- MC5
- The McCoys
- The McGuire Sisters
- Melanie
- Mercy
- Merle Haggard
- Merle Travis
- The Merseybeats
- The Meters
- Mickey & Sylvia
- Mighty Clouds of Joy
- Mike Bloomfield
- Miles Davis
- Millie Small
- The Miracles
- Miriam Makeba
- Mitch Ryder & The Detroit Wheels
- Mitty Collier
- Moby Grape
- The Monkees
- The Moody Blues
- Mose Allison
- Motherlode
- The Mothers of Invention
- Mountain
- The Move
- The Moving Sidewalks
- Mr. Acker Bilk
- Muddy Waters
- The Murmaids
- The Music Machine
- Nancy Sinatra
- Napoleon XIV
- The Nashville Teens
- Nazz
- Neil Christian
- Neil Diamond
- Neil Sedaka
- Neil Young
- The Neon Philharmonic
- The Newbeats
- The New Lost City Ramblers
- The New Vaudeville Band
- The Nice
- Nico
- Nina Simone
- Nino Tempo & April Stevens
- Norma Tanega
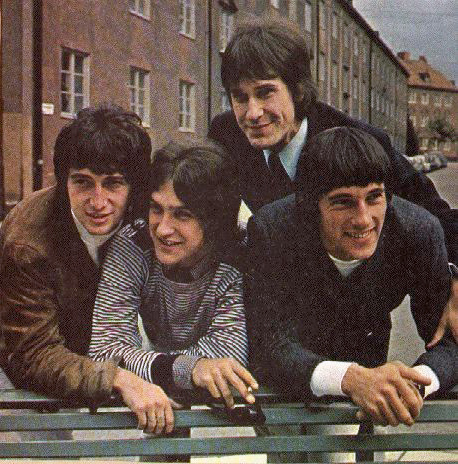
The Kinks

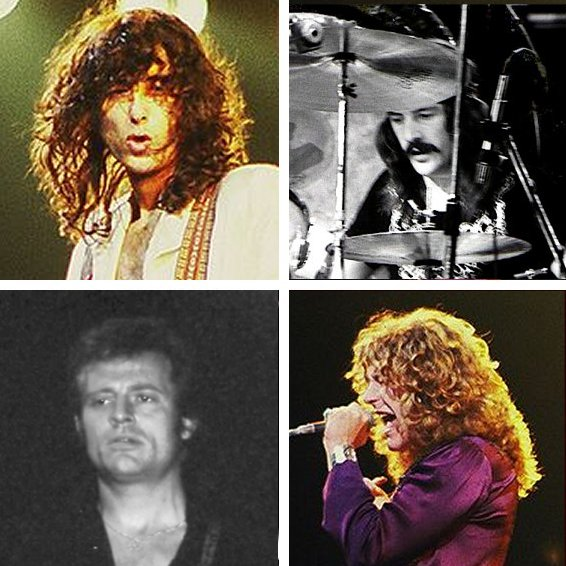
Led Zeppelin

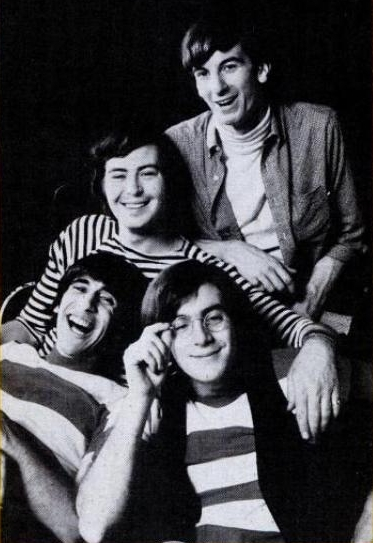
The Lovin' Spoonful

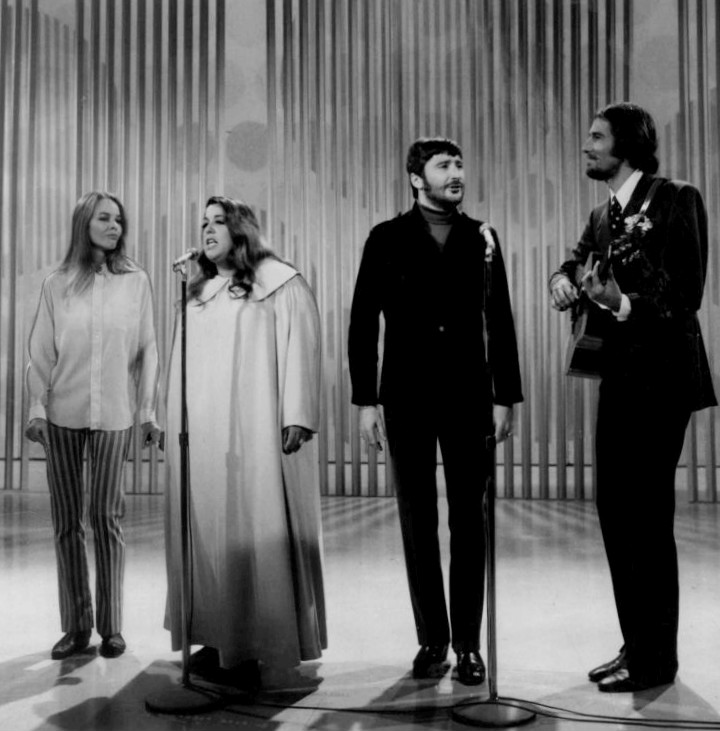
The Mamas & the Papas

== O-R ==
- O.C. Smith
- Ohio Express
- The O'Jays
- The O'Kaysions
- Oliver
- The Olympics
- The Originals
- The Orlons
- Orpheus
- Os Mutantes
- Oscar Brand
- Otis Blackwell
- Otis Redding
- Otis Rush
- The Outsiders
- O.V. Wright
- Paco de Lucía
- The Paris Sisters
- The Parliaments
- The Paupers
- Pat Boone
- Patsy Cline
- Patti LaBelle & the Bluebelles
- Paul & Barry Ryan
- Paul & Paula
- Paul Anka
- Paul Butterfield Blues Band
- Paul Jones
- Paul Mauriat
- Paul Petersen
- Paul Revere & The Raiders
- Peaches & Herb
- Pearl Carr and Teddy Johnson
- Pearls Before Swine
- Peggy Lee
- Peggy March
- Pentangle
- People (band)
- Percy Faith
- Percy Sledge
- Perrey and Kingsley
- Perry Como
- Pete Drake
- Peter & Gordon
- Peter Jay and the Jaywalkers
- Peter, Paul & Mary
- Pete Seeger
- Petula Clark
- Phil Keaggy
- Phil Ochs
- Pic-Nic
- The Piltdown Men
- Pink Floyd
- P.J. Proby
- Plastic Ono Band
- The Platters
- P.P. Arnold
- The Premiers
- The Pretty Things
- The Pyramids
- Procol Harum
- Quicksilver Messenger Service
- The Radiants
- Rahul Dev Burman
- The Raindrops
- Ralph Mctell
- The Ramrods
- Ramsey Lewis
- The Ran-Dells
- Randy & the Rainbows
- Rare Earth
- The Rascals
- Ravi Shankar
- Ray Brown & The Whispers
- Ray Charles
- Ray Columbus & the Invaders
- Ray Peterson
- Ray Price
- Ray Stevens
- The Reflections
- The Regents
- The Remains
- Richard Harris
- Richie Havens
- Ricky Nelson
- The Righteous Brothers
- The Rip Chords
- The Rivieras
- The Rivingtons
- Roberta Flack
- Robert Conti
- Robert Knight
- Robert Parker
- Robin Ward
- The Rockin' Berries
- The Rockin' Rebels
- The Rocky Fellers
- Roger Miller
- Roger Williams
- The Rolling Stones
- The Ronettes
- Ronnie Dove
- Ronny & the Daytonas
- The Rooftop Singers
- Rory Gallagher
- Rosie & the Originals
- Rotary Connection
- The Royalettes
- The Royal Guardsmen
- Roy Clark
- Roy Head & The Traits
- Roy Orbison
- Roy Young Band
- Ruby & the Romantics
- Rufus Thomas
- The Rugbys
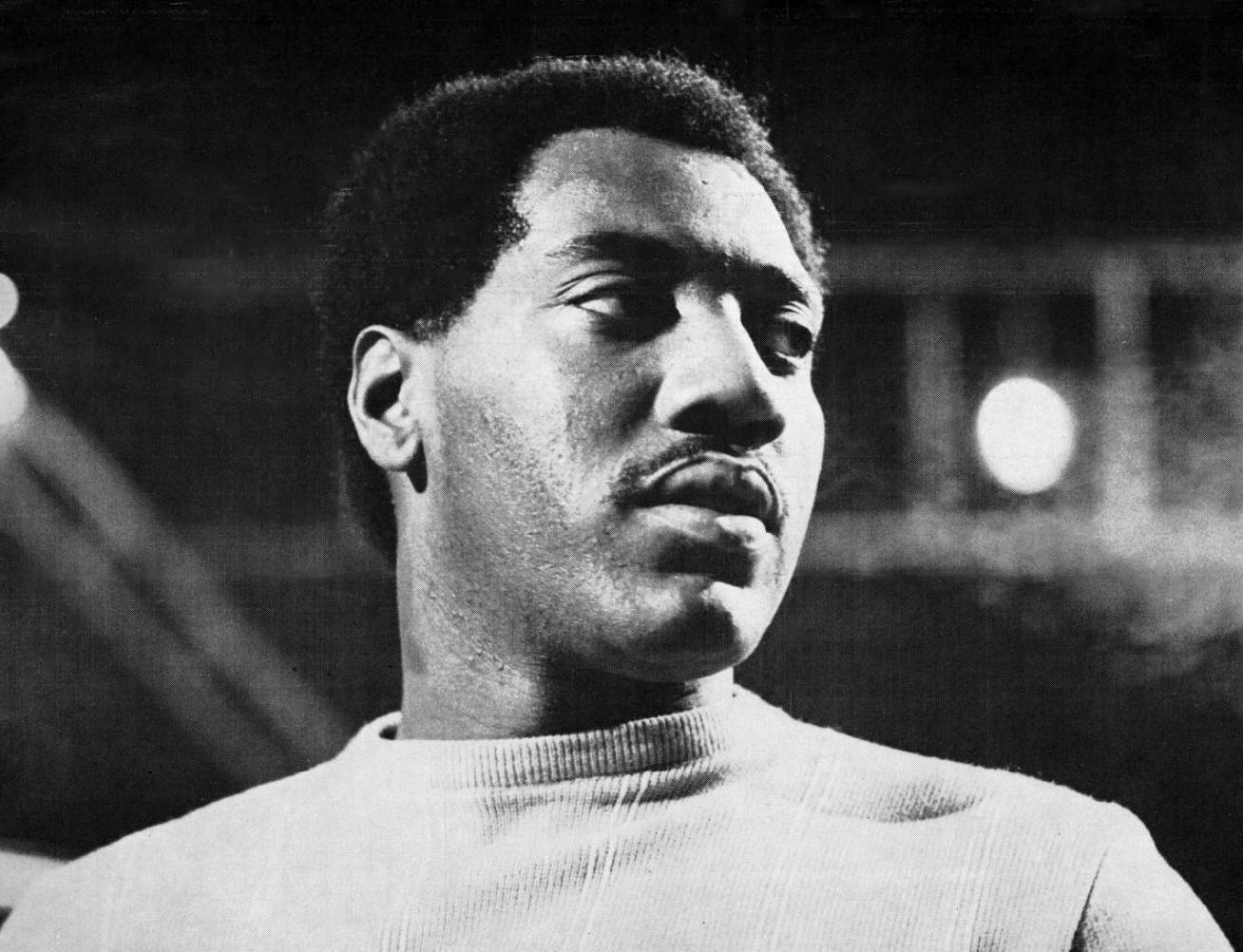
Otis Redding

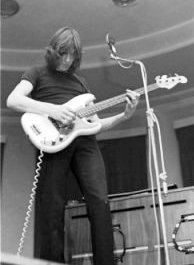
Pink Floyd

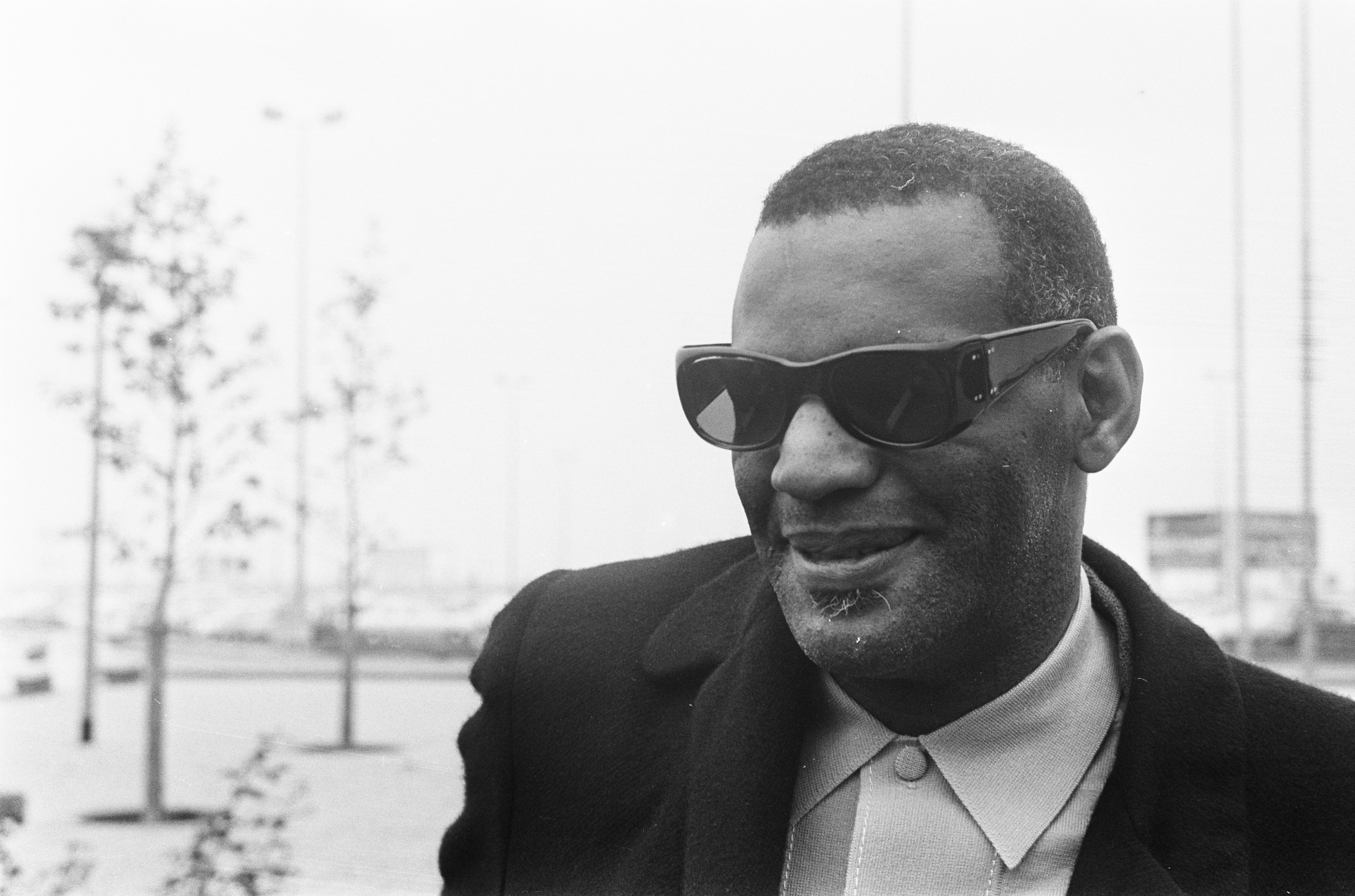
Ray Charles

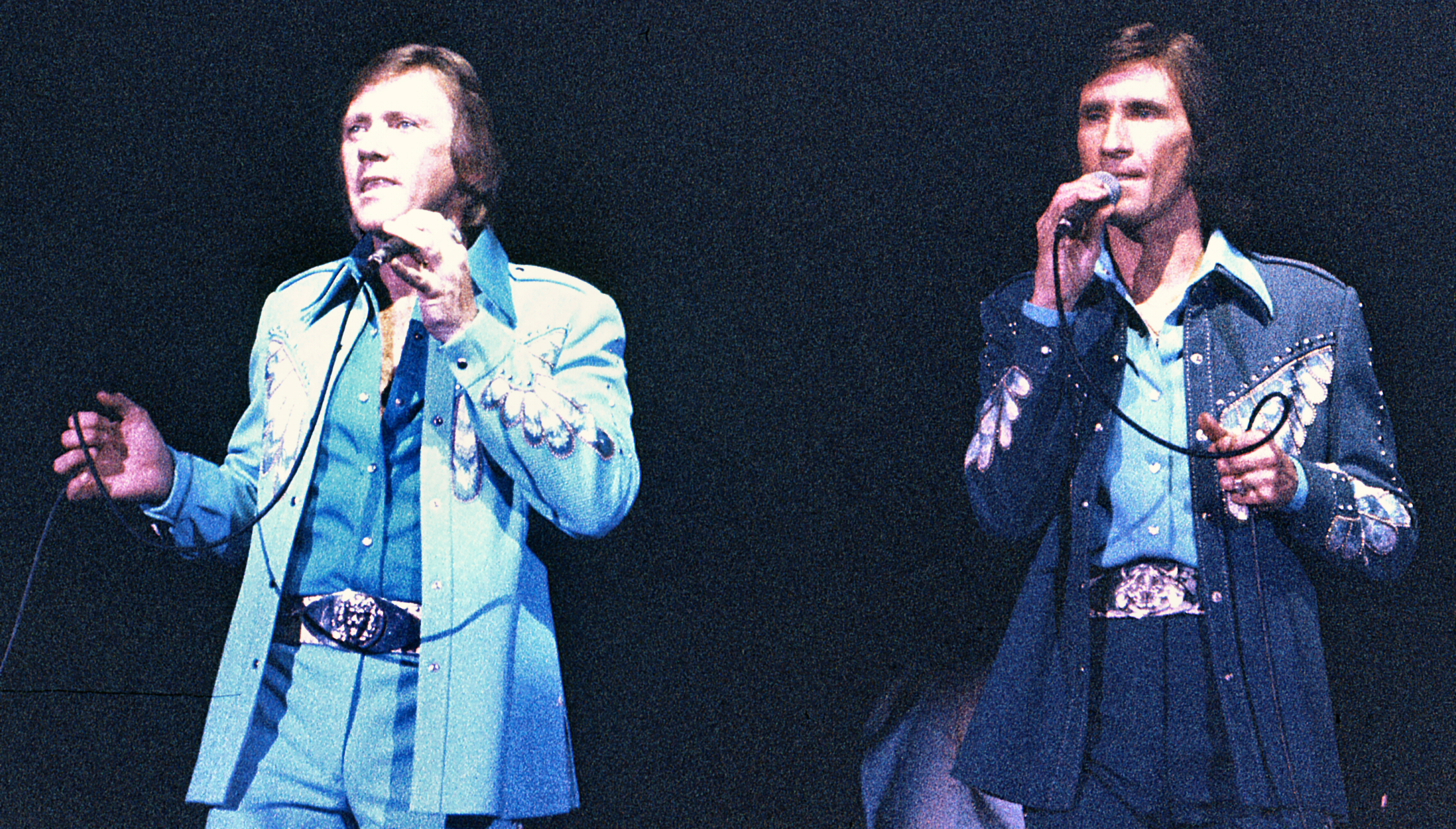
The Righteous Brothers

== S ==
- Sabicas
- The Sacred Mushroom
- The Safaris
- Sagittarius
- Salil Chowdhury
- Sam Cooke
- Sam & Dave
- Sam The Sham & The Pharaohs
- Sandie Shaw
- The Sandpipers
- The Sandpipers (Not the same as the band above on list)
- Sandy Nelson
- Sandy Posey
- Santo & Johnny
- Sarah Vaughan
- The Scaffold
- Scott McKenzie
- Scott Walker
- Screamin' Jay Hawkins
- The Searchers
- The Seeds
- The Seekers
- Sérgio Mendes
- Sha Na Na
- The Shades of Blue
- The Shadows
- The Shadows of Knight
- The Shangri-Las
- Shelby Flint
- Shelley Fabares
- The Shells
- Shep & The Limelites
- The Shirelles
- Shirley Bassey
- Shirley Ellis
- Shocking Blue
- The Showmen
- The Silkie
- Silver Apples
- Simon & Garfunkel
- Simon Dupree and The Big Sound
- The Singing Nun
- Sir Douglas Quintet
- Skeeter Davis
- The Skyliners
- Slim Harpo
- Sly & The Family Stone
- Small Faces
- Smith
- Soft Machine
- Solomon Burke
- The Sonics
- Sonny & Cher
- Sonny Stitt
- Sopwith Camel
- Spanky & Our Gang
- The Spencer Davis Group
- Spiral Starecase
- Spirit
- Spooky Tooth
- The Spotnicks
- The Springfields
- The Standells
- Stan Getz
- The Statler Brothers
- Status Quo
- Steam
- Steppenwolf
- The Stereos
- Steve Lawrence
- The Steve Miller Band
- Stevie Wonder
- The Stooges
- The Strangeloves
- Strawberry Alarm Clock
- The String-A-Longs
- The Stylistics
- Sue Thompson
- Sun Ra
- The Supremes
- The Surfaris
- Sweet Inspirations
- The Swinging Blue Jeans
- The Swingin' Medallions
- Syd Barrett
- Syndicate of Sound
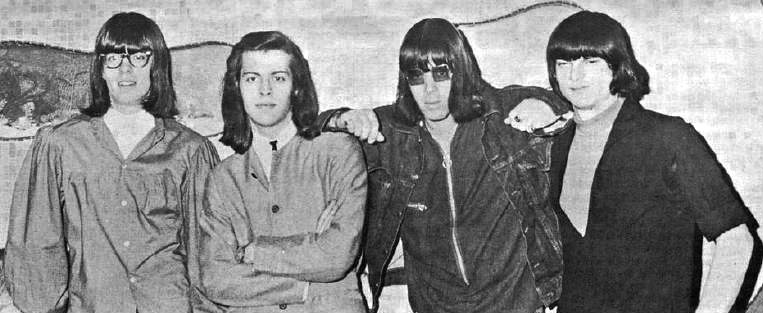
The Seeds

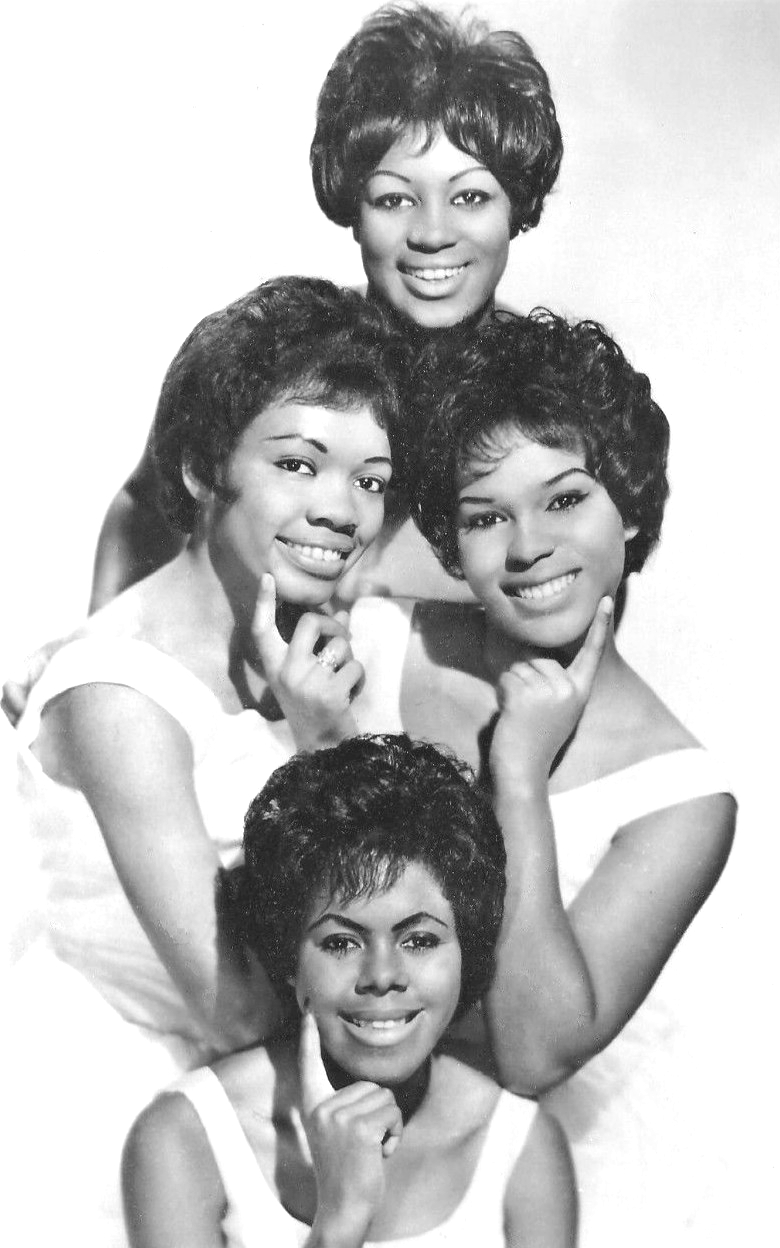
The Shirelles

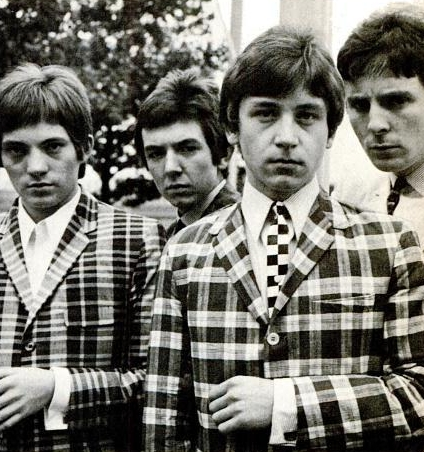
Small Faces

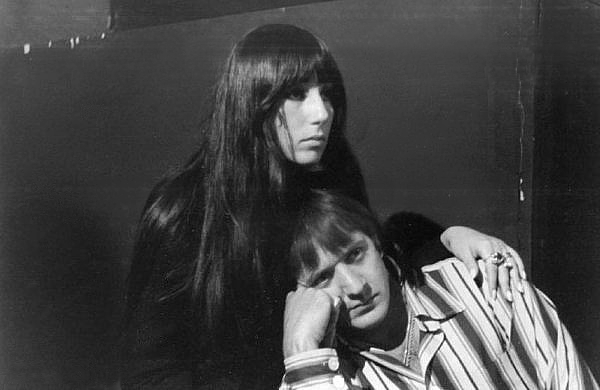
Sonny & Cher

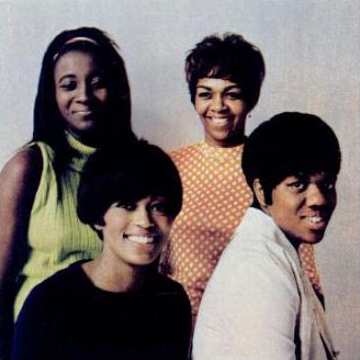
Sweet Inspirations

== T-Z ==
- Tages
- Taj Mahal
- Tammi Terrell
- Tammy Wynette
- The Tams
- Taste
- The Temptations
- Ten Years After
- Terry Reid
- Terry Stafford
- Three Dog Night
- Thunderclap Newman
- Tim Buckley
- Tim Hardin
- Timi Yuro
- The Tokens
- Tom Jones
- Tom Paxton
- Tom Rush
- Tomorrow
- Tommy James & The Shondells
- Tommy Roe
- Tony Bennett
- Tony Clarke
- Tony Orlando
- Toots & the Maytals
- The Torero Band
- The Tornados
- Toussaint McCall
- The Toys
- Traffic
- The Trashmen
- The Tremeloes
- Trini Lopez
- The Troggs
- Troy Shondell
- The Turtles
- The Tymes
- T. Rex
- Twinkle (Lynn Annette Ripley)
- Tyrone Davis
- Ultimate Spinach
- Unit 4 + 2
- The United States of America
- The Valentinos
- Van Dyke Parks
- Vanilla Fudge
- Vanity Fare
- Van Morrison/Them
- The Velvelettes
- The Velvet Underground
- The Ventures
- Vikki Carr
- The Vogues
- The Waikikis
- The Walker Brothers
- Wanda Jackson
- Wayne Fontana & the Mindbenders
- We Five
- Wes Montgomery
- The West Coast Pop Art Experimental Band
- The Whispers
- White Noise
- The Who
- The Wilde Flowers
- William Bell
- Willie Mitchell
- Willie Nelson
- Wilson Pickett
- The Winstons
- The Wurzels
- The Yardbirds
- Yehudi Menuhin
- Yellow Balloon
- Yoko Ono
- The Youngbloods
- Young-Holt Unlimited
- Zager and Evans
- The Zombies
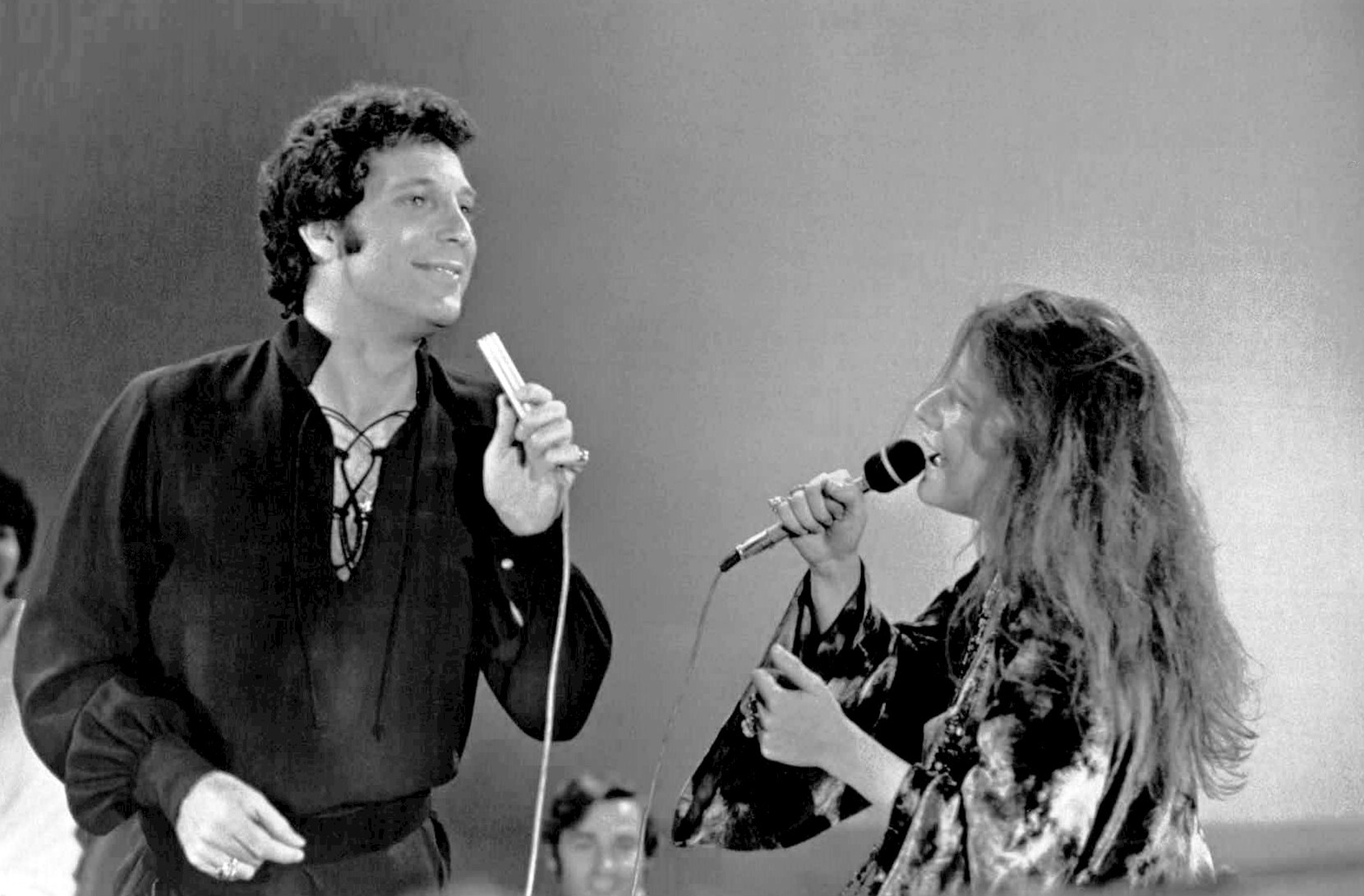
Tom Jones and Janis Joplin

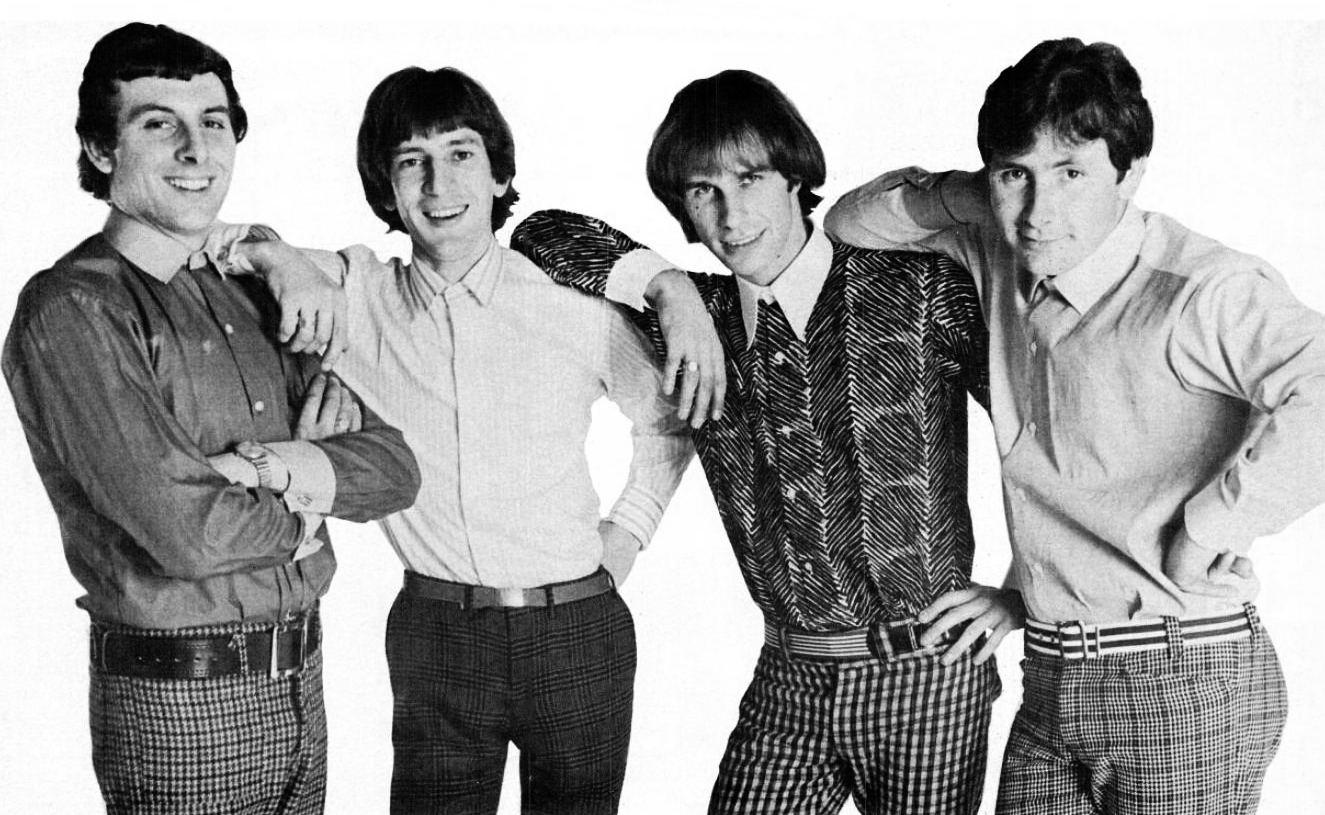
The Troggs

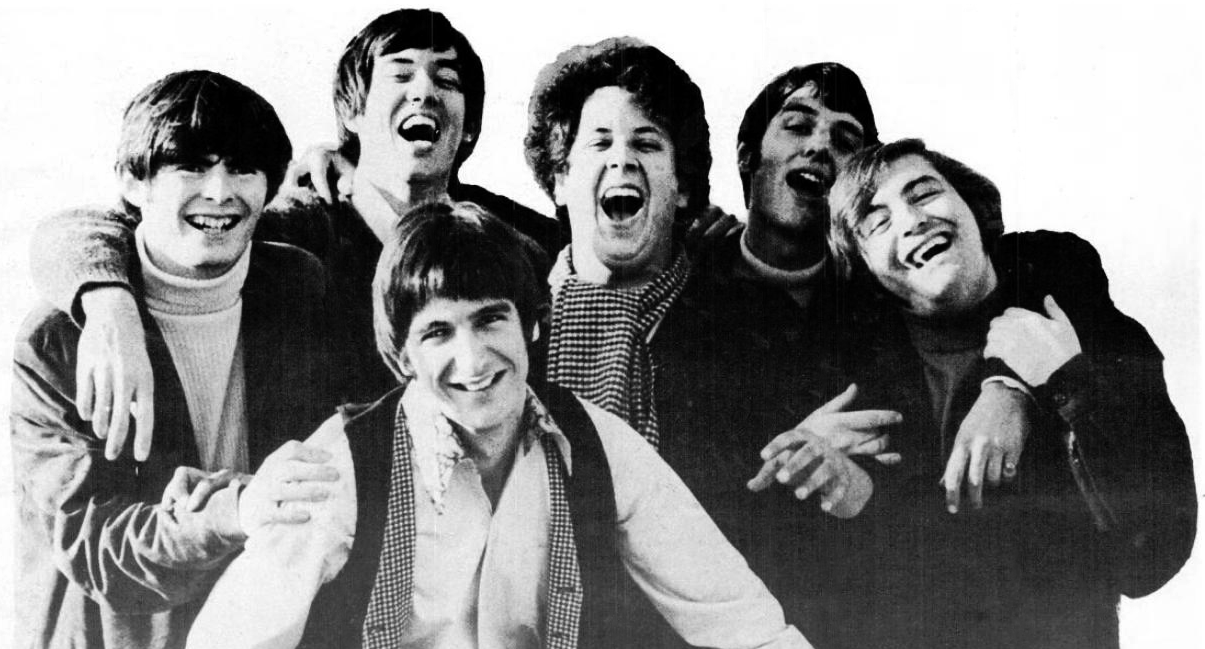
The Turtles

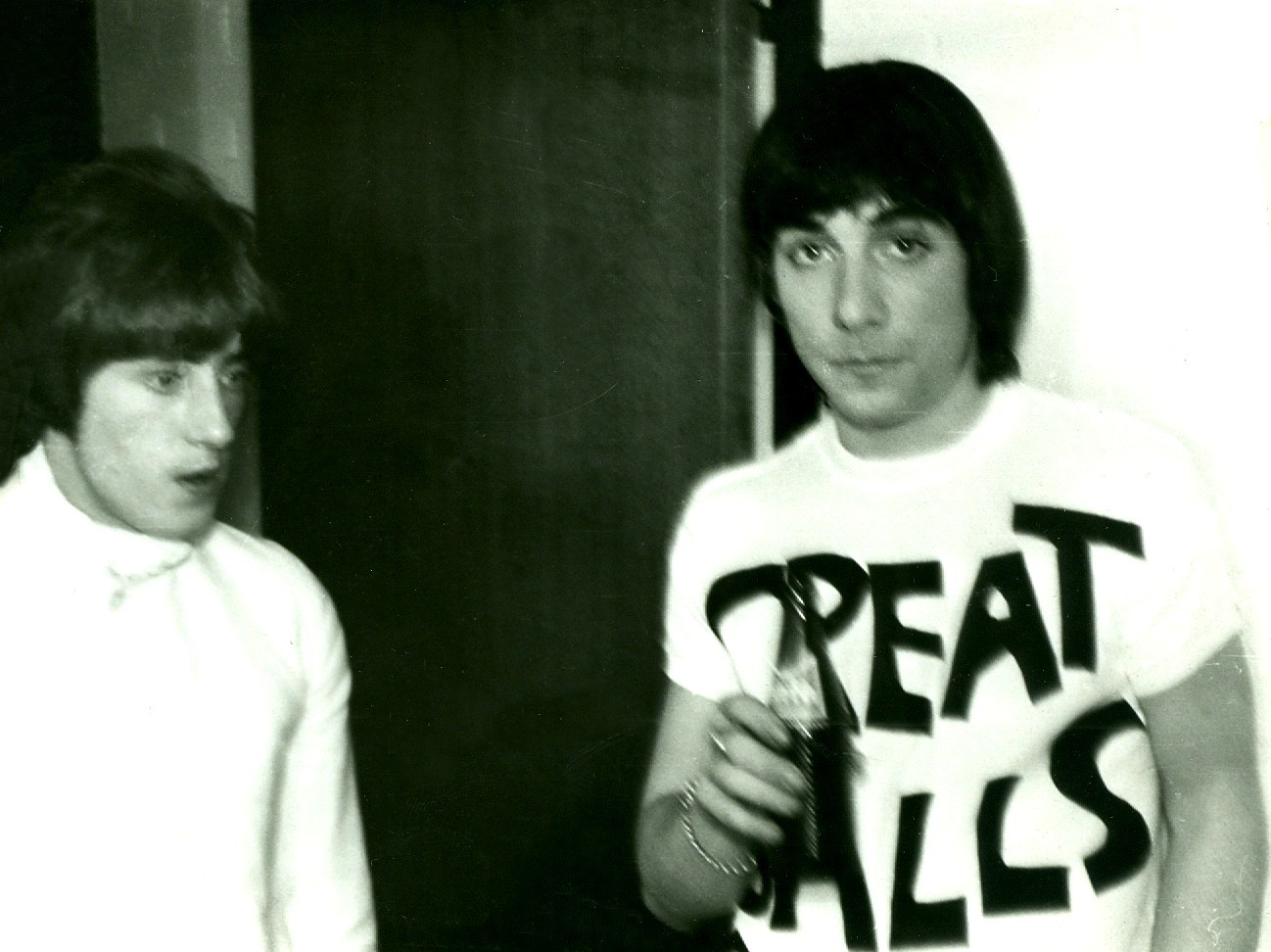
The Who

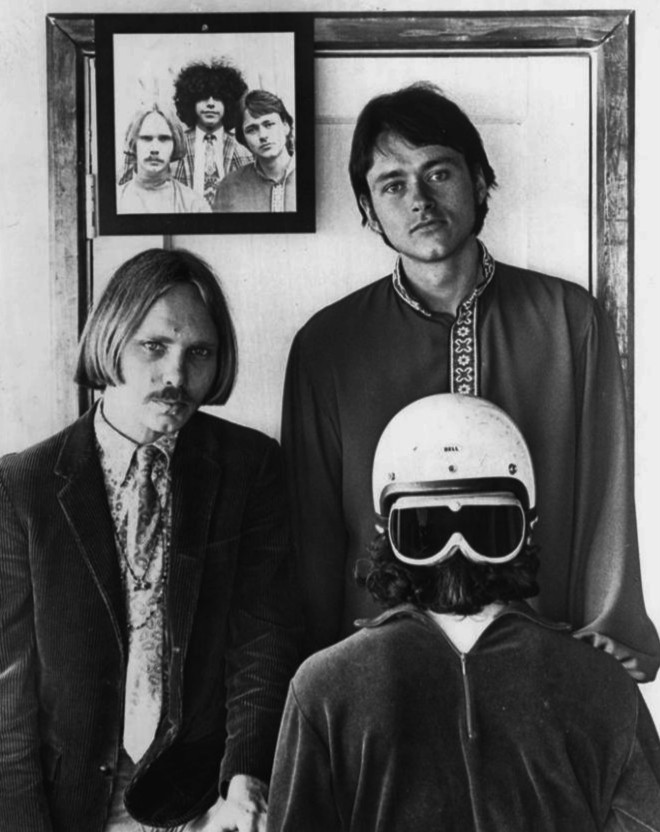
The Youngbloods

== See also ==
- Category:Musical groups established in the 1960s
