= How to Commit Marriage =

1969 film by Norman Panama

- Directed by: Norman Panama
- Written by: Michael Kanin; Ben Starr
- Produced by: Bill Lawrence
- Starring: Bob Hope; Jackie Gleason
- Cinematography: Charles Lang
- Edited by: Ronald Sinclair
- Music by: Joseph J. Lilley
- Production company: Naho Productions
- Distributed by: Cinerama Releasing Corporation
- Release date: May 28, 1969
- Running time: 95 minutes
- Country: United States
- Language: English

How to Commit Marriage is a 1969 American comedy film directed by Norman Panama, and starring Bob Hope, Jackie Gleason, Tina Louise, Irwin Corey, Leslie Nielsen, Tim Matheson and Jane Wyman in her final film role. It was filmed in the current version of Cinerama. A rock band entitled The Comfortable Chair appears as a rock group, performing their song "A Child's Garden."

== Plot ==
Music student Nancy, the 19-year-old daughter of real estate broker Frank Benson and his wife Elaine, wants to marry fellow music student David, the 20-year-old son of Oliver Poe, a record producer. What the bride doesn't know is that her parents are getting a divorce. Oliver Poe is opposed to marriage and forbids the children from planning their marriage. He discovers and exposes the Bensons' secret. Nancy and David decline this unnecessary marriage. They will live together instead, traveling around the country with a rock band and heeding the advice and wisdom of a Persian mystic called the Baba Zeba. Frank and Elaine see other people. He is involved with a divorcée, Lois Grey, while she is developing an interest in Phil Fletcher, who is recently divorced. Poe meets LaVerne Baker, who becomes his live-in girlfriend. One day, Nancy finds out she is pregnant. The Baba Zeba, paid off by Oliver, persuades Nancy to put up the baby for adoption. Frank and Elaine conspire behind their daughter's back to adopt their own grandchild. Complications arise, resulting in Frank trying to bribe the Baba Zeba and disguising himself as one of the guru's followers. The Bensons are reunited, David and Nancy have a baby, and Poe and LaVerne are married.

== Cast ==
- Bob Hope as Frank Benson
- Jackie Gleason as Oliver Poe
- Jane Wyman as Elaine Benson
- Leslie Nielsen as Phil Fletcher
- Maureen Arthur as Lois Grey
- Tina Louise as LaVerne Baker
- Tim Matheson as David Poe
- Paul Stewart as Willoughby
- Irwin Corey as the Baba Zeba
- Joanna Cameron as Nancy Benson

== Release ==
The film premiered on May 28, 1969 in Miami Beach, Florida. In the week ended June 18, 1969 it had expanded to eight cities and grossed $145,350.

== See also ==
- List of American films of 1969
