= The Aerovons =

The Aerovons were an American rock band from St Louis, Missouri.

== History ==
The Aerovons were formed in 1966 in St Louis, Missouri by Tom Hartman. A representative of Capitol Records heard a 1967 demo record that they had made. In spite of an offer to record in Los Angeles, the group held out hope that they could record in London, the recording home of their heroes, The Beatles. In 1968, they traveled to London twice, receiving offers from both EMI and Decca. In 1969, the band returned to London and recorded an album at EMI studios, now known as Abbey Road. Guitarist Bob Frank, an original member of the band, left the group just before they went to London to record, due to personal issues. He was replaced briefly by Phil Edholm, a guitarist introduced to the group only a few months before leaving for England. Unfortunately, he did not work out either and was released by the group soon after arriving in England.

Once the album was finished, the band returned to St. Louis where more personal problems between a group member and his family caused the group to splinter. EMI decided not to release the album. EMI invited Tom Hartman to come to England and restart, but Hartman felt that moving to England was too great a step at his age. The partnership with EMI was then dissolved. The album was not released until RPM issued it on CD in 2003.

The album was engineered by Beatles' engineers Norman Smith, Geoff Emerick, Phil McDonald, and Alan Parsons (who also played recorder on one of the album's tracks).

== Members ==
- Tom Hartman - piano, guitar
- Bob "Ferd" Frank - guitar
- Mike Lombardo - drums
- Gary Goelzhauser- drums
- Bill Lombardo - bass
- Phil Edholm - guitar

In the summer of 2021, a new release called "A Little More" came out to positive reviews with several songs on it written just after their return from England, along with a song called "Swinging London", which speaks about their experience in England.

== Discography ==
=== Albums ===
1969 - Resurrection LP

1. World of You
2. Resurrection
3. Say Georgia
4. With Her
5. Quotes and Photos
6. Words from a Song
7. Bessy Goodheart
8. Something of Yours
9. She's Not Dead
10. The Years
11. Everything's Alright
12. The Children
- Bonus tracks [2003 CD]
1. The Train [single A-side]
2. Song for Jane [single B-side]
3. Here [unreleased song]
4. World of You [demo]

2021 - A Little More CD

1. Stopped!
2. Shades of Blue
3. Me and My Bomb
4. You & Me
5. So Sorry
6. A Little More
7. The Way Things Went Tonight
8. Swinging London

2024 - World Of You (The Complete Recordings) 2CD

=== Singles ===
- "The Train" / "A Song For Jane" (1969)
- "World Of You" / "Say Georgia" (1969)
