= The Braillettes =

American vocal group

The Braillettes, on the cover of their album Our Hearts Keep Singing.

The Braillettes were a vocal group from Alameda, California, United States. The group consisted of three women (Maggie Liebnitz, Jackie Overalls, and Kay Smith), two of whom (Overalls and Smith) were blind. They released one album, titled Our Hearts Keep Singing, in 1968.

The album cover for Our Hearts Keep Singing is often credited as one of the worst album covers of all time.

The cover photograph was taken by their high school classmate, John Skoglund, who later married Maggie Liebnitz.

Our Hearts Keep Singing was recorded at Whitney Studios in Glendale between 1968 and 1969). Musician Frank Zappa's Hot Rats and other Zappa albums (as well as countless independently produced religious LPs) were also recorded at owner Loren Whitney's classic studio, which was known for its superlative Wurlitzer organ.
