= Bull & the Matadors =

Bull & the Matadors were an American funk group from East St Louis, Illinois. They had a hit single in 1968 with the tune "The Funky Judge", released on Toddlin' Town Records. The record peaked at #39 on the Billboard Hot 100 and #9 on the US Billboard R&B chart. They released two further singles, "Move With the Groove" and "You Decide/Love Come Down", but neither cracked the charts, and the group was not heard from again.

== Members ==
- James Lafayette "Bull" Parks
- Milton Hardy
- James Otis Love
- Robert Lee Holmes
