= The Velaires =

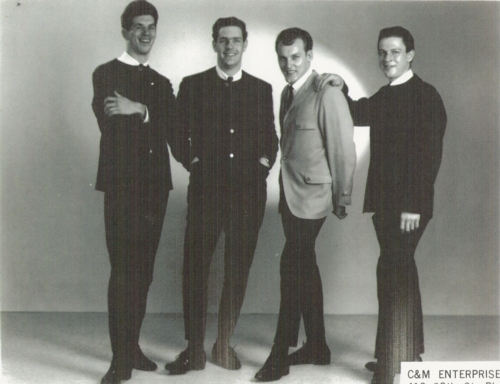
The Velaires

The Velaires were an American rock and roll band from Sioux City, Iowa.

== Early years ==
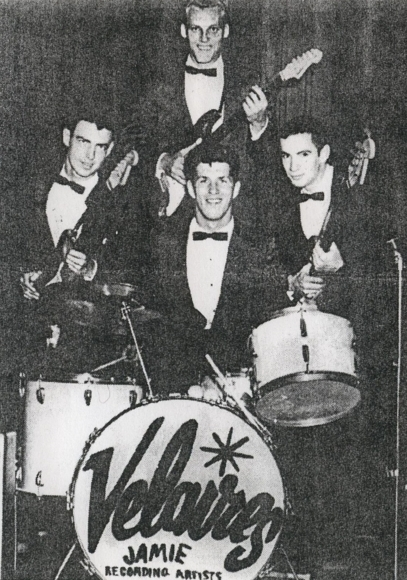
The Velaires

The group began as The Screamers in 1958. Founding member Don Bourret explained the origin in a 2013 newspaper article:

We were the Screamers in 1958 at Central High School. Truth be known — we actually got our start as a group of mostly swimmers who liked to sing in the shower. So we decided to enter the Central High School talent show. The singers were Denny Wurster, Jerry DeMers and Jeff Lockhart and musicians Bob Dawdy, Roger Hughes and myself. Our sextet performed "Bebopalula".

They soon after changed their name to The Flairs (not to be confused with the doo-wop group The Flairs based in Los Angeles). However, after playing in the legendary Val Air Ballroom in Des Moines, and with numerous groups on the scene with that same name, they became The Velaires.

== Personnel ==
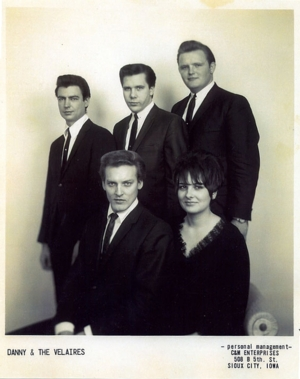
Danny and the Velaires. In the photo are the original members, left to right: Bob Dawdy, guitar; Gary Kimble St. Martin, drums; George Norman, bass; Danny Matousek, guitar and lead vocals; Carolyn Chipman (later, Carolyn Matousek), vocals.

The band consisted of Daniel Matousek on rhythm guitar, Bob Dawdy (December 16, 1942 – January 21, 2013) on lead guitar, Jerry DeMers on bass and Don Bourret on drums. The fifth Velaire was their full-time manager and booking agent, Dan's older brother, Richard "Dick" LaMiere Matousek.

== First group ==
In 1961, as The Flairs, they released their cover of Chuck Berry's classic, “Roll Over Beethoven” on Palm Records. Later in 1961, as The Velaires, they signed with Jamie Records and again released "Roll Over Beethoven".

The record leapt onto the Billboard charts rising to No. 51 nationally and reaching No. 1 in Los Angeles.

Bourett said that the name change from The Flairs to The Velairs resulted from a problem with a recording company contract. When they needed to make a change, he explained: "We had just played the Vel Air Ballroom in Des Moines, so we said, 'Hey, let's become the Velaires!', a slight difference in spelling of the ballroom, and, that has stuck ever since."

While "Roll Over Beethoven" was on the charts, The Velaires had the opportunity to appear on Dick Clark’s American Bandstand in Philadelphia being the only-Iowa based group to have ever done so. They also joined the Caravan of Stars for a time.

They would follow “Roll Over Beethoven” with eight more releases on such labels as Jamie Records, Mercury Records, Palm Records, Ramco Records and Brent Records. Other releases on Jamie Records included their cover of "Dream" (Johnny Mercer) and "Ubangi Stomp" (Earl Bostic).

== Re-formed group ==
The original members would stay together until 1963 when Dan Matousek would reform the group and continue on until 1970 under the name of Danny and The Velaires.

This band recorded in 1966 in Omaha several originals that received ample airplay, but never charted after "Roll Over Beethoven." Gary Kimble St. Martin left in 1967 to join Iowa Rock 'n' Roll Hall of Fame group, Greg Scott and The Embers.

In 1997, much-deserved recognition came their way when Germany's Bear Family Records released on CD their Greatest Hits/Anthology, The Screamers To Flairs To The Velaires: Sioux City To Phoenix.

== Later years ==
The Velaires continue to tour with drummer Bourret, keyboardist Gene Ambroson, bassist Mike King, guitarist Bill “Chopper” Pelchat and saxophonist Dave Napier.

== Recognition ==
The Velaires are in two state rock and roll halls of fame. They were inducted into the Iowa Rock n Roll Music Association's Hall of Fame in 1997 and into the South Dakota Rock and Roll Music Association's Hall of Fame in 2013.

== Deaths of members ==
Daniel Matousek died in May 1998 just a few days prior of a scheduled performance of the group at the DanceMor Ballroom in Swisher, Iowa.

Dick Matousek died on October 24, 2011, at home, in Sioux City, Iowa. He was 74.

Bob Dawdy died on January 21, 2013, at home, in Sioux City, Iowa, at age 70.
