= The Comfortable Chair =

The Comfortable Chair is a West Coast musical group that released one self-titled album, The Comfortable Chair, in 1968. The name of the band refers to sitting in a comfortable chair while meditating—a practice in transcendental meditation, with which several members were involved.

== History ==
The Comfortable Chair was formed in 1967. Although the group was reportedly discovered by Jim Morrison of The Doors, he had no involvement with the group, which was discovered and produced by Doors members John Densmore and Robby Krieger. The group issued one album on Lou Adler's label, Ode records. Their self-titled debut album, was released in 1968 to positive reviews but little commercial success. In a retrospective, Rob Fitzpatrick of The Guardian called it "a delight." The group disbanded in 1969.

The group appeared in the 1968 Bob Hope and Jackie Gleason comedy movie How to Commit Marriage as a rock group associated with the young people in the plot, performing their protest song "A Child's Garden."

== Members ==
| (1968–1971) | Bernie Schwartz - lead vocals; Barbara Baczek-Wallace - lead vocals; Gene Garfin- woodwinds, percussion, vocals; Greg LeRoy - bass guitar; Warner Davis - percussion; Tad Baczek - guitar; Gary Davis - keyboards |
