= Nephelium papillatum =

Scientific classification
- Kingdom: Plantae
- Clade: Tracheophytes
- Clade: Angiosperms
- Clade: Eudicots
- Clade: Rosids
- Order: Sapindales
- Family: Sapindaceae
- Genus: Nephelium
- Species: N. papillatum

Binomial name
- Nephelium papillatum Leenh.

Species of flowering plant

Nephelium papillatum is a species of flowering plant, a tropical forest fruit-tree in the rambutan family, that is endemic to Borneo.

== Description ==
The species grows as a tree to 36 m in height with a 5 m bole and 2 m buttresses. The compound pinnate leaves have 2–3 pairs of oval leaflets, 4.5–10.5 cm long by 2.5–4.5 cm wide. The inflorescences consist of panicles of small white to cream flowers. The dark red fruits are 2.25 cm long by 1.25–1.75 cm wide and are covered by soft 2 mm spikes, with the seed coated with an edible, white sarcotesta.

== Distribution and habitat ==
The species is found in the Malaysian state of Sabah in northern Borneo, where it occurs in mixed hill and lower montane forest, rich in oaks and chestnuts, at elevations of 600–1,300 m.

== Usage ==
The species is not cultivated; the fruits are mainly collected from the forest, though trees may be found in the vicinity of villages where they have grown from discarded seeds.
