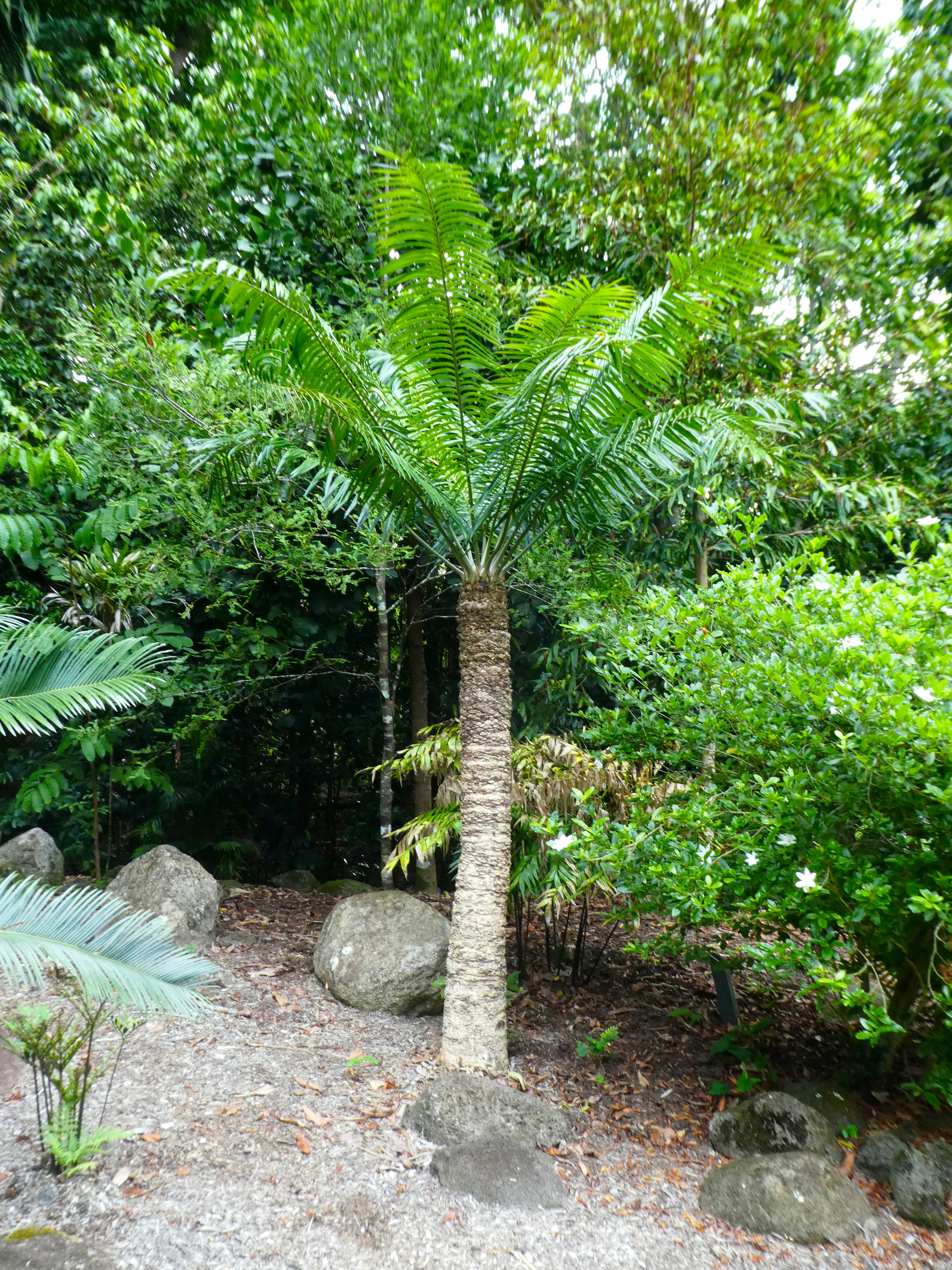
- In Cairns Botanic Gardens

Conservation status
- Least Concern (IUCN 3.1)

Scientific classification
- Kingdom: Plantae
- Clade: Tracheophytes
- Clade: Gymnospermae
- Division: Cycadophyta
- Class: Cycadopsida
- Order: Cycadales
- Family: Zamiaceae
- Genus: Lepidozamia
- Species: L. hopei

Binomial name
- Lepidozamia hopei (W.Hill) Regel

Synonyms
- Catakidozamia hopei W.Hill; Macrozamia denisonii var. hopei (W.Hill) J.Schust.; Macrozamia hopei (W.Hill) W.Hill ex C.Moore

= Lepidozamia hopei =

Species of cycad

Lepidozamia hopei, commonly known as Hope's cycad or zamia palm, is a species of cycad in the family Zamiaceae, endemic to a small part of the Australian state of Queensland. It grows as an understorey tree in rainforest, and is reputed to be the tallest known species of cycad.

== Description ==
Hope's cycad is a tree reaching up to 20 m (66 ft) high and 50 cm (20 in) trunk diameter. It normally has a single trunk and crown, although forked trunks occur on occasions. The fronds may reach up to 3 m (9.8 ft) long with as many as 200 leaflets each. The leaflets are dark green, fairly stiff, and up to 3 cm (1.2 in) wide and 40 cm (16 in) long. The cones are quite large – male cones measure up to 40 cm (16 in) tall and 14 cm (5.5 in) diameter and female cones are up to 60 cm (24 in) tall and 30 cm (12 in) diameter. The seeds when mature measure about 5 cm (2.0 in) long by 4 cm (1.6 in) wide and are sheathed in a bright red sarcotesta.

It is reputed to be the tallest known species of cycad and it towers over other understorey vegetation, but rarely reaches the forest canopy.

== Taxonomy ==
This plant was first described in 1865, as Catakidozamia hopei, by Scottish-Australian botanist Walter Hill who published the description in The Gardeners' chronicle and agricultural gazette. It was later transferred to the genus Lepidozamia by German botanist Eduard August von Regel, who published the new name in 1876.

== Distribution and habitat ==
Lepidozamia hopei is found in a small part of northeast Queensland, from the area around the Bloomfield River in the north, to the lowlands just south of Tully. It inhabits rainforest and neighbouring forests at altitudes from near sea level to about 600 m (2,000 ft).

== Conservation ==
This species has been assessed to be of least concern by the International Union for Conservation of Nature (IUCN) and as 'Special Least Concern' (SL) by the Queensland Government under its Nature Conservation Act. The status SL is unique to Queensland, and lies between 'Least Concern' and 'Near Threatened'.

== Ecology ==
The seeds are eaten by cassowaries, and the fleshy seed coat is eaten by native rodents.

== Gallery ==
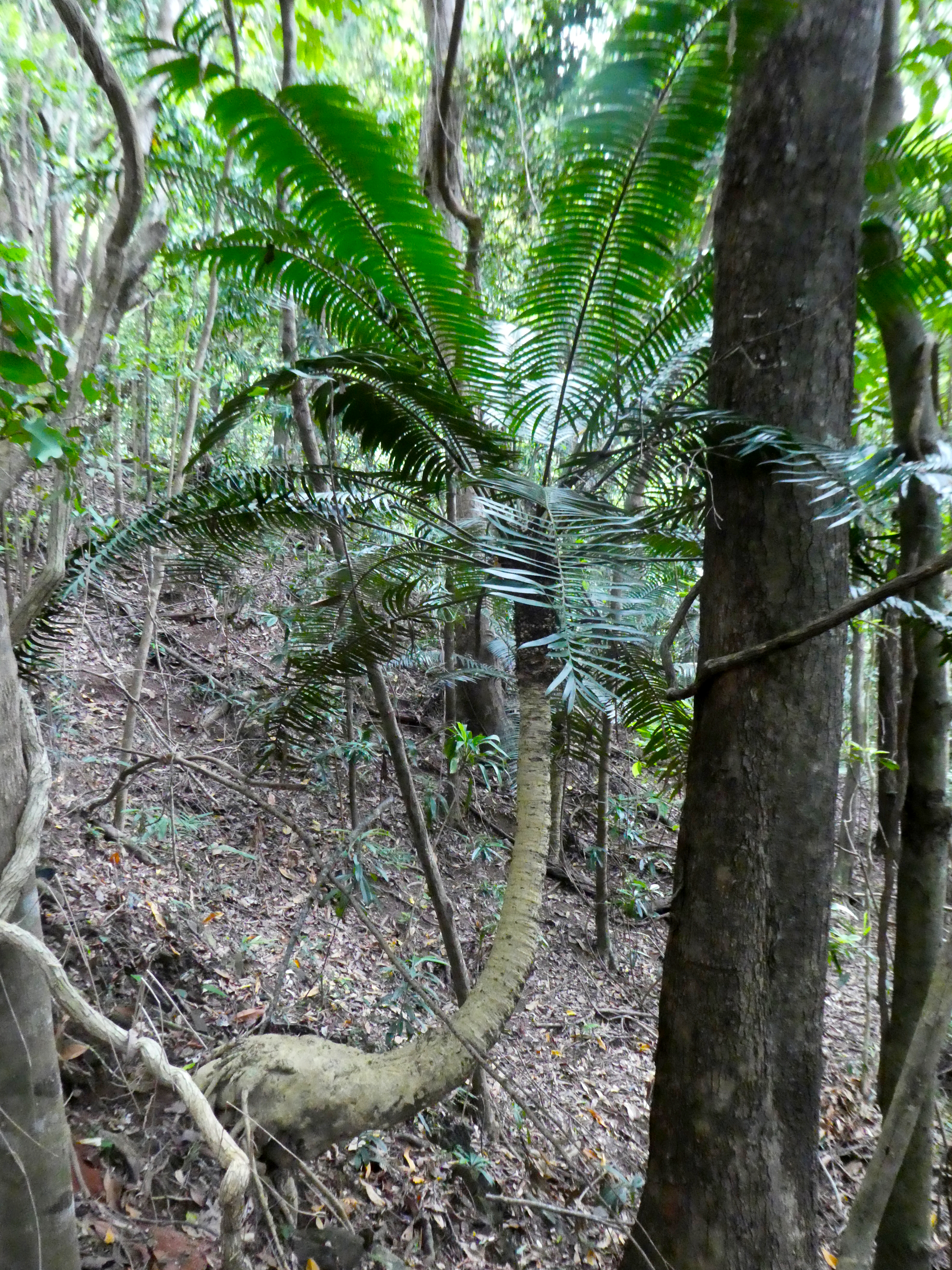
Growing on a hillside near Cairns, Queensland

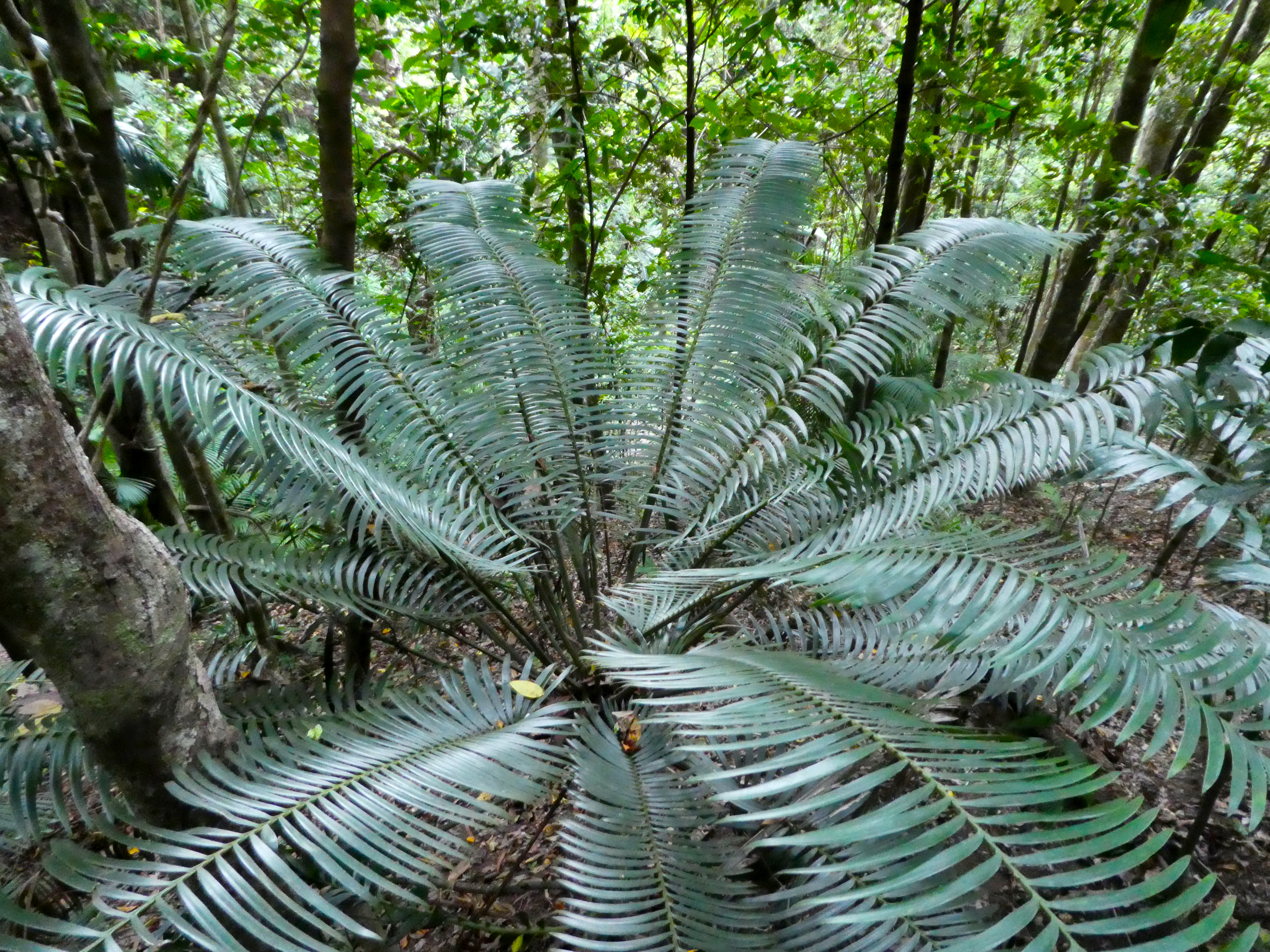
Crown, from above

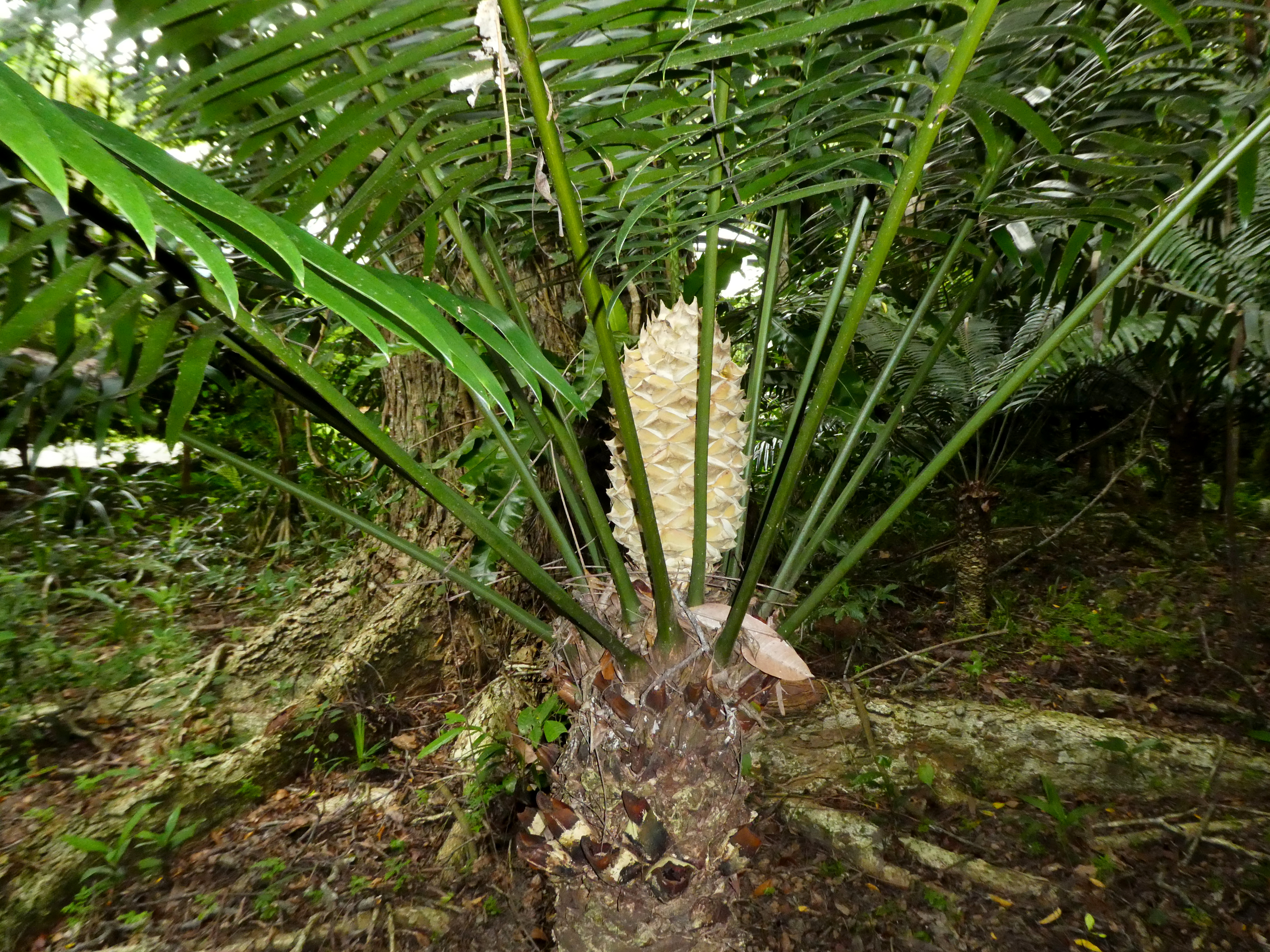
Immature female cone

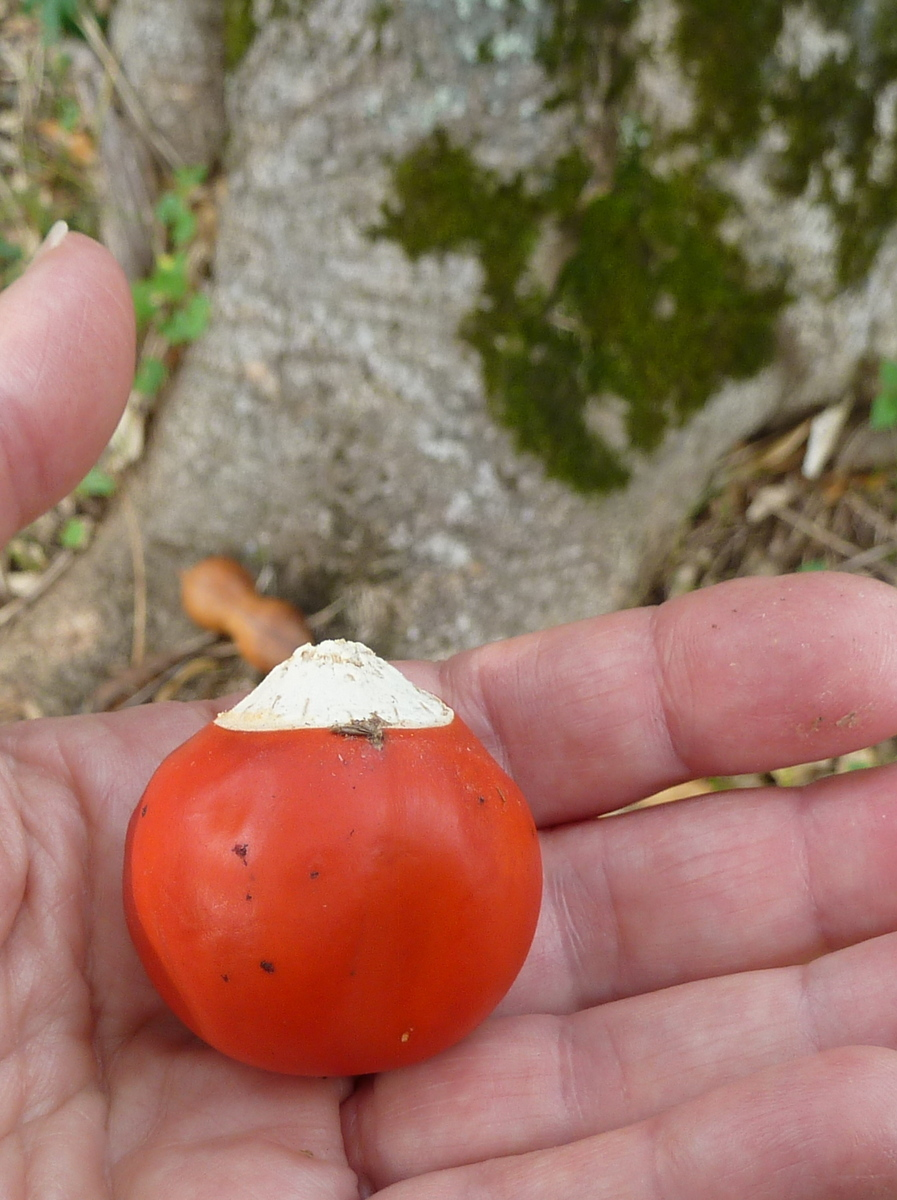
Seed
