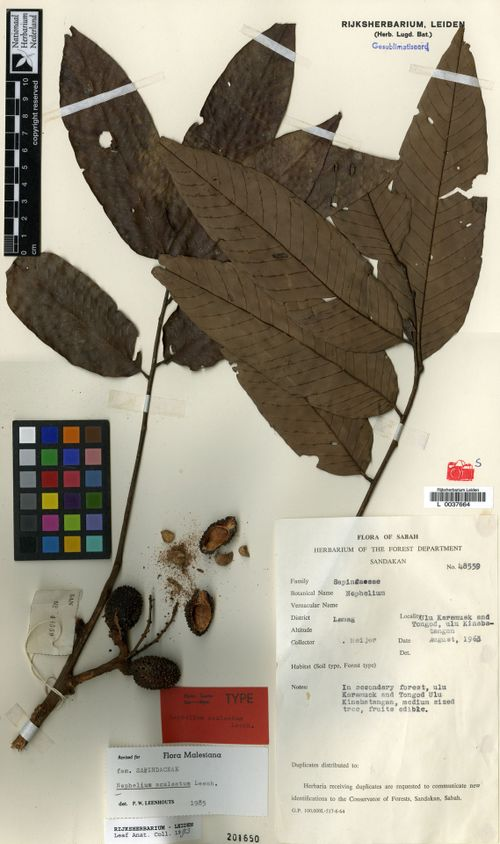

Conservation status
- Critically Endangered (IUCN 3.1)

Scientific classification
- Kingdom: Plantae
- Clade: Tracheophytes
- Clade: Angiosperms
- Clade: Eudicots
- Clade: Rosids
- Order: Sapindales
- Family: Sapindaceae
- Genus: Nephelium
- Species: N. aculeatum

Binomial name
- Nephelium aculeatum Leenh.

= Nephelium aculeatum =

Species of tree

Nephelium aculeatum, also known as Rambutan utan, is a tree that is native to Borneo. It is part of the family Sapindaceae. Its fruit is edible and is oval shaped. It has groups of four stemming jugate leaves and its petioles can be 8–10 cm (3.1–3.9 in) long. The leaves and fruits look somewhat similar to Nephelium hypoleucum.
