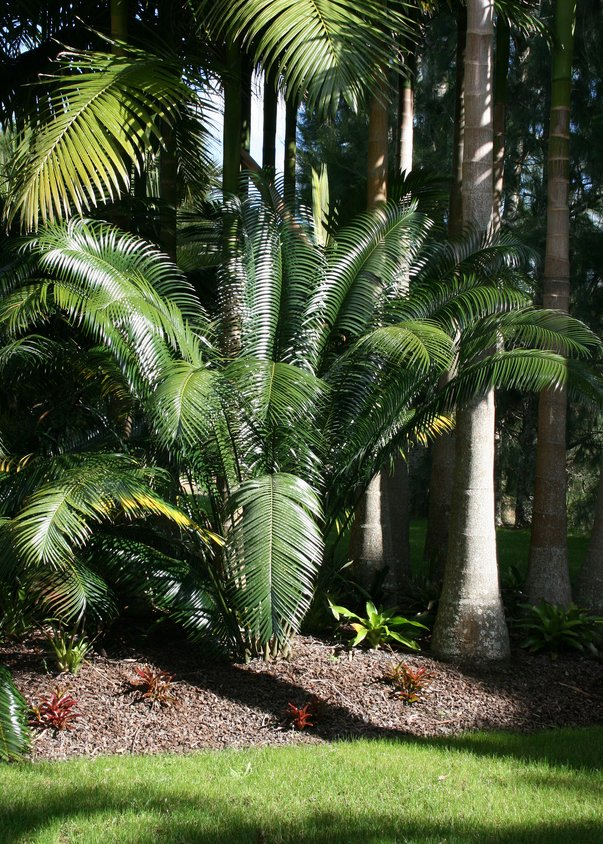
- Lepidozamia peroffskyana growing at Kerikeri, New Zealand.

Conservation status
- Least Concern (IUCN 3.1)

Scientific classification
- Kingdom: Plantae
- Clade: Embryophytes
- Clade: Tracheophytes
- Clade: Spermatophytes
- Clade: Gymnospermae
- Division: Cycadophyta
- Class: Cycadopsida
- Order: Cycadales
- Family: Zamiaceae
- Genus: Lepidozamia
- Species: L. peroffskyana

Binomial name
- Lepidozamia peroffskyana Regel

Synonyms
- Macrozamia denisonii, Regel

= Lepidozamia peroffskyana =

Species of cycad

Lepidozamia peroffskyana is a palm-like cycad in the family Zamiaceae. It is endemic to eastern Australia, in Queensland and New South Wales. The species is named after Count Peroffsky (1794-1857), benefactor of the St. Petersburg Botanical Garden.

== Description ==
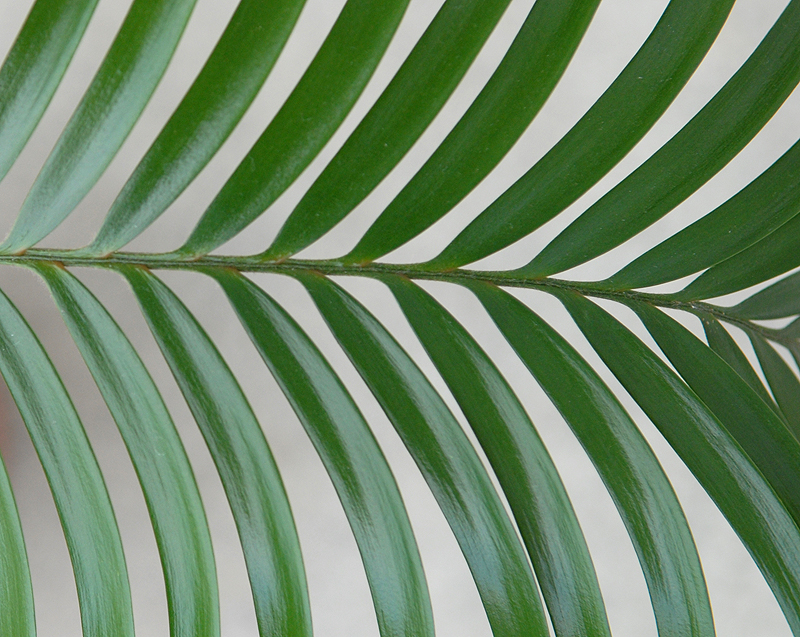
Leaf detail.

Lepidozamia peroffskyana is slow-growing, low maintenance, long-lived cycad that makes a good feature plant in semi-shaded positions or in a container. It grows up to seven metres tall but more usually reaches about four metres. The trunk is up to eighty centimetres in diameter and is covered by the persistent remains of leaf bases forming an interesting texture. The crown develops from numerous leaves up to three metres long, each bearing about two hundred narrow, glossy, dark green leaflets, somewhat lax, spreading and softly coriaceous. Each has seven to thirteen parallel veins which helps to distinguish this species from other members of the genus. The plant produces a rosette of fronds each year, there being six rosettes at any given time, stacked one above the other. As the newest matures, the lowest one dies back. The cylindrical cones are some of the largest of all cycad cones, rivalled only by Encephalartos transvenosus. The male cones can reach seventy five centimetres long and the female cones ninety centimetres, weighing up to forty five kilograms. The seeds are large and numerous and have red sarcotesta.

All parts of the plant, especially the seeds, are toxic to both livestock and humans. If ingested, the seeds can cause severe gastrointestinal irritation and abdominal cramps, vomiting and nausea, diarrhea, and potentially also liver damage and muscular paralysis.

== Reproductive biology ==
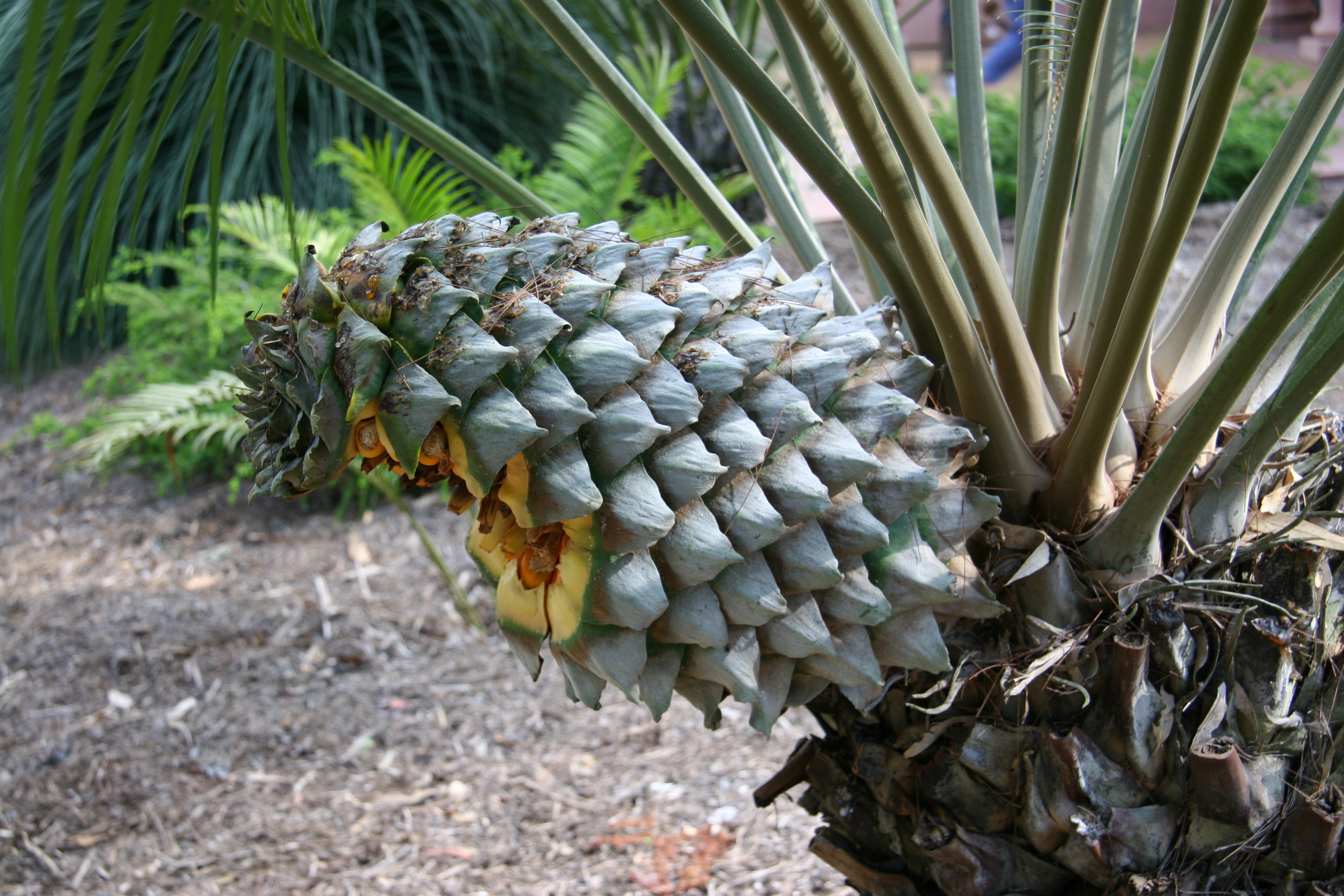
L. peroffskyana cone

The pollen of this cycad is not airborne. Typically, the pollen is transported by a host-specific insect from male to female cones when they are receptive. Pollen of L. peroffskyana is carried by the Tranes group weevils. The weevil's life-cycle occurs in the male cones, but many individuals visit female cones during their lives, covered in pollen. The plant exudes a scent to attract the weevils to the reproductive cones. Weevils gather at the male cones as they are about to open and release pollen. The male cones supply pollen and biomaterial so that the weevils have sites for oviposition as well as food as their activity destroys the cones.

== Distribution and habitat ==
This species is found in southeastern Queensland and northeastern New South Wales, occurring between Gympie, north of Brisbane and the Manning River near Forster. It grows in scattered small communities in wet sclerophyll forests or on rainforest margins, usually on steep slopes from sea level up to about 1,000 metres.
