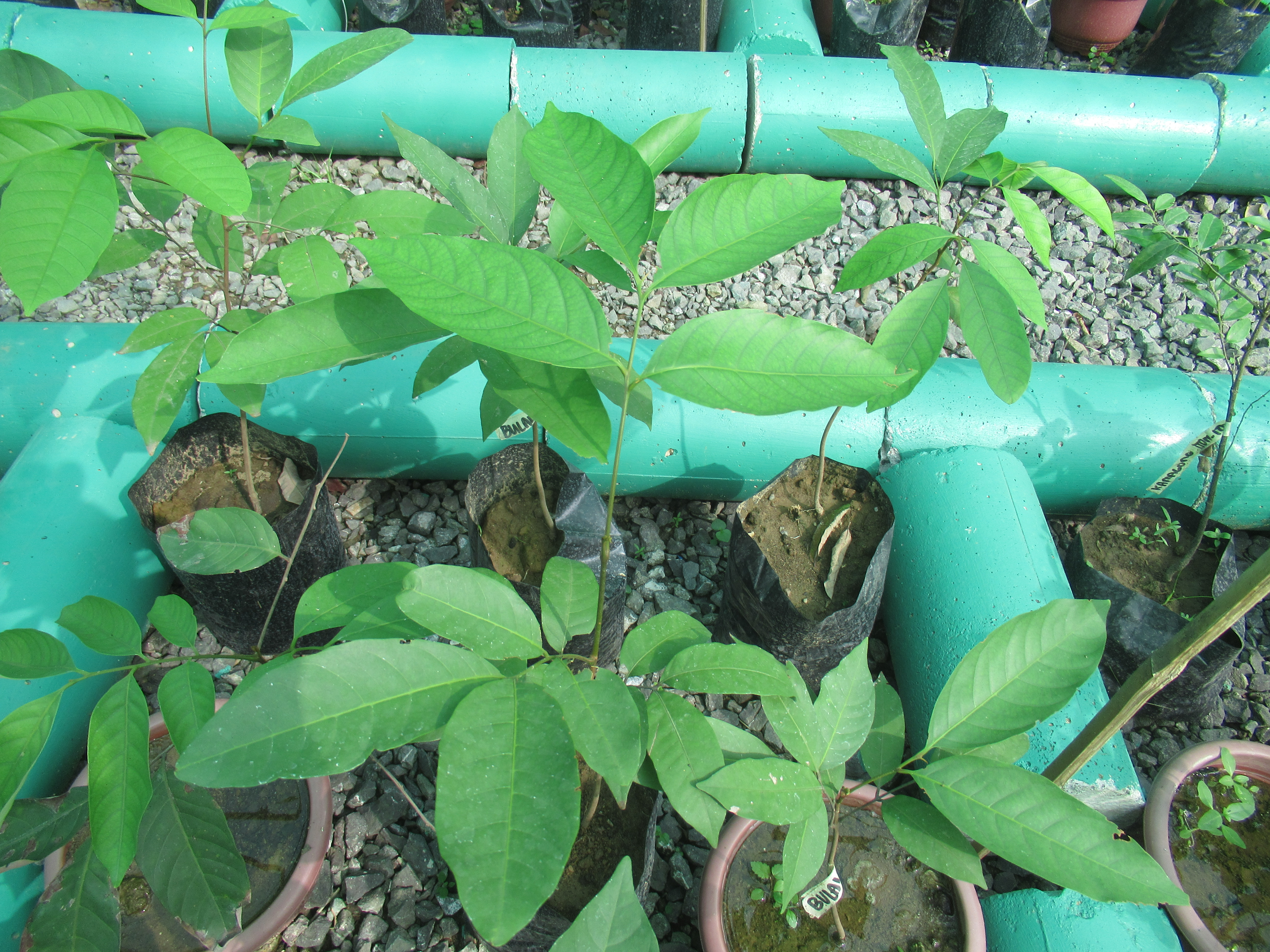
- Bulala seedling (Philippines)

Scientific classification
- Kingdom: Plantae
- Clade: Tracheophytes
- Clade: Angiosperms
- Clade: Eudicots
- Clade: Rosids
- Order: Sapindales
- Family: Sapindaceae
- Genus: Nephelium
- Species: N. chryseum

Binomial name
- Nephelium chryseum Blume

= Nephelium chryseum =

Species of fruit and plant

Nephelium chryseum is a species of plant related to the rambutan. The plant produces edible fruit that are covered in hard red shells with spikey spines. It is native to southern China, Borneo, the Philippines, and Vietnam.
