= Nephelium cuspidatum =

Conservation status
- Least Concern (IUCN 3.1)

Scientific classification
- Kingdom: Plantae
- Clade: Tracheophytes
- Clade: Angiosperms
- Clade: Eudicots
- Clade: Rosids
- Order: Sapindales
- Family: Sapindaceae
- Genus: Nephelium
- Species: N. cuspidatum

Binomial name
- Nephelium cuspidatum Blume

Species of flowering plant

Nephelium cuspidatum, also known as rambutan hutan in Malay and buah sibau in Iban, is a species of flowering plant, a tropical forest fruit-tree in the rambutan family, that is native to Southeast Asia.

== Varieties ==
Varieties include:

- N. cuspidatum var. cuspidatum Blume
- N. cuspidatum var. robustum (Radlk.) Leenh.
- N. cuspidatum var. eriopetalum (Miq.) Leenh.
- N. cuspidatum var. multinerve Leenh.
- N. cuspidatum var. bassacense Leenh.
- N. cuspidatum var. ophiodes Leenh.

== Description ==
The species grows as a tree to 40 m in height with a 3–6 m bole and small buttresses. The pinnate leaves have 2–13 pairs of oval to oblong leaflets. The inflorescences consist of spikes or racemes of pink and white flowers. The hairy, oval, red to yellowish-red fruits are 2–4 cm long by 2–3 cm in diameter, each containing a seed covered with an edible, white sarcotesta.

== Distribution and habitat ==
The species occurs over a wide range extending from Myanmar to Thailand, Cambodia, Vietnam, the Philippines, the Malay Peninsula, Borneo, Sumatra and Java. It occurs in mixed dipterocarp forest, usually on ridges and hillslopes.

== Usage ==
The species is widely cultivated and the fruits sold in markets.
