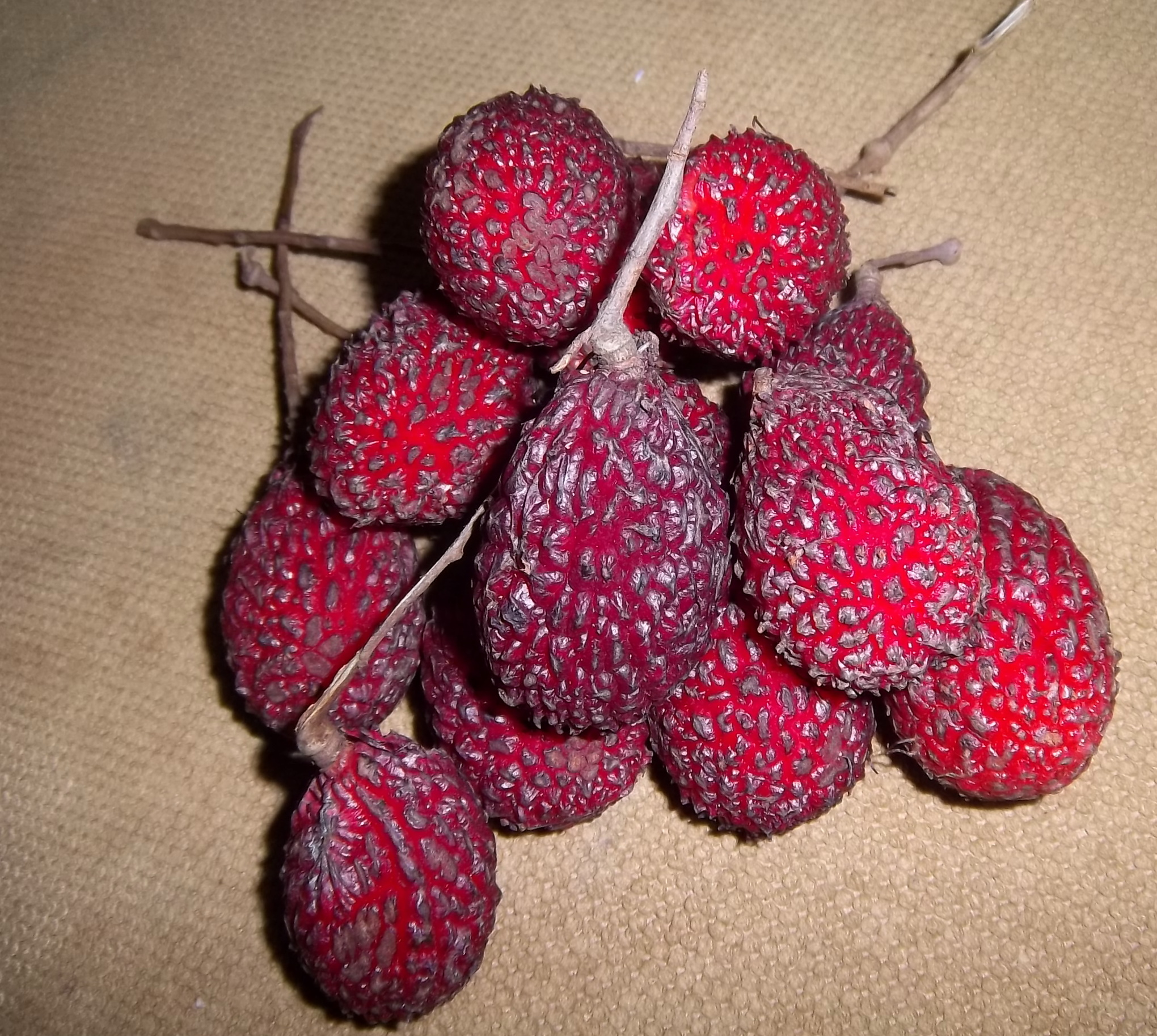
- the fruits of Nephelium xerospermoides

Scientific classification
- Kingdom: Plantae
- Clade: Embryophytes
- Clade: Tracheophytes
- Clade: Angiosperms
- Clade: Eudicots
- Clade: Rosids
- Order: Sapindales
- Family: Sapindaceae
- Genus: Nephelium
- Species: N. xerospermoides

Binomial name
- Nephelium xerospermoides Radlk.

= Nephelium xerospermoides =

Species of fruit and plant

Nephelium xerospermoides, the hairless rambutan, is a species closely related to the rambutan. The drupe fruit has a flavor similar to rambutan. The fruit does not have any hair-like spines, hence its common name. They can be eaten freshly picked from the tree. They are not commonly grown or harvested for commercial use.

== See also ==
- Rambutan
- Nephelium
- Sapindaceae
- Drupe
