= Nephelium maingayi =

Conservation status
- Least Concern (IUCN 3.1)

Scientific classification
- Kingdom: Plantae
- Clade: Tracheophytes
- Clade: Angiosperms
- Clade: Eudicots
- Clade: Rosids
- Order: Sapindales
- Family: Sapindaceae
- Genus: Nephelium
- Species: N. maingayi

Binomial name
- Nephelium maingayi Hiern

Species of flowering plant

Nephelium maingayi, also known as serait in Malay, mujau in Iban, and buah sungkit in Sabah and Brunei, is a species of flowering plant, a tropical forest fruit-tree in the rambutan family, that is native to Southeast Asia.

== Description ==
The species grows as a tree to 40 m in height with a 6–10 m bole, sometimes with small buttresses. The pinnate leaves have 2–5 pairs of oval leaflets, 5.75–22 cm long by 2.75–9 cm wide. The inflorescences consist of panicles of flowers without petals. The warty, oval, bright red fruits have flattened sides and are 2–3.75 cm long by 1.25–1.75 cm wide by 1–1.25 cm thick, each containing a seed covered with an edible, white sarcotesta.

== Distribution and habitat ==
The species is found on the Malay Peninsula, Borneo and Sumatra, where it occurs in mixed dipterocarp and secondary forests, from lowland flood plains and peat swamps up to 1,600 m in lower montane forest.

== Usage ==
Although the species is occasionally cultivated, the fruits are mainly collected from the forest and sold in rural markets.
