= Dichomeris indiserta =

Scientific classification
- Kingdom: Animalia
- Phylum: Arthropoda
- Class: Insecta
- Order: Lepidoptera
- Family: Gelechiidae
- Genus: Dichomeris
- Species: D. indiserta

Binomial name
- Dichomeris indiserta Meyrick, 1926

Species of moth

Dichomeris indiserta is a moth in the family Gelechiidae. It was described by Edward Meyrick in 1926. It is found in Malaysia.

The wingspan is about 12 mm. The forewings are pale brownish, irregularly sprinkled with darker brown. The second discal stigma is minute and dark brown. The hindwings are light bluish grey.

The larvae feed on Nephelium lappaceum.
