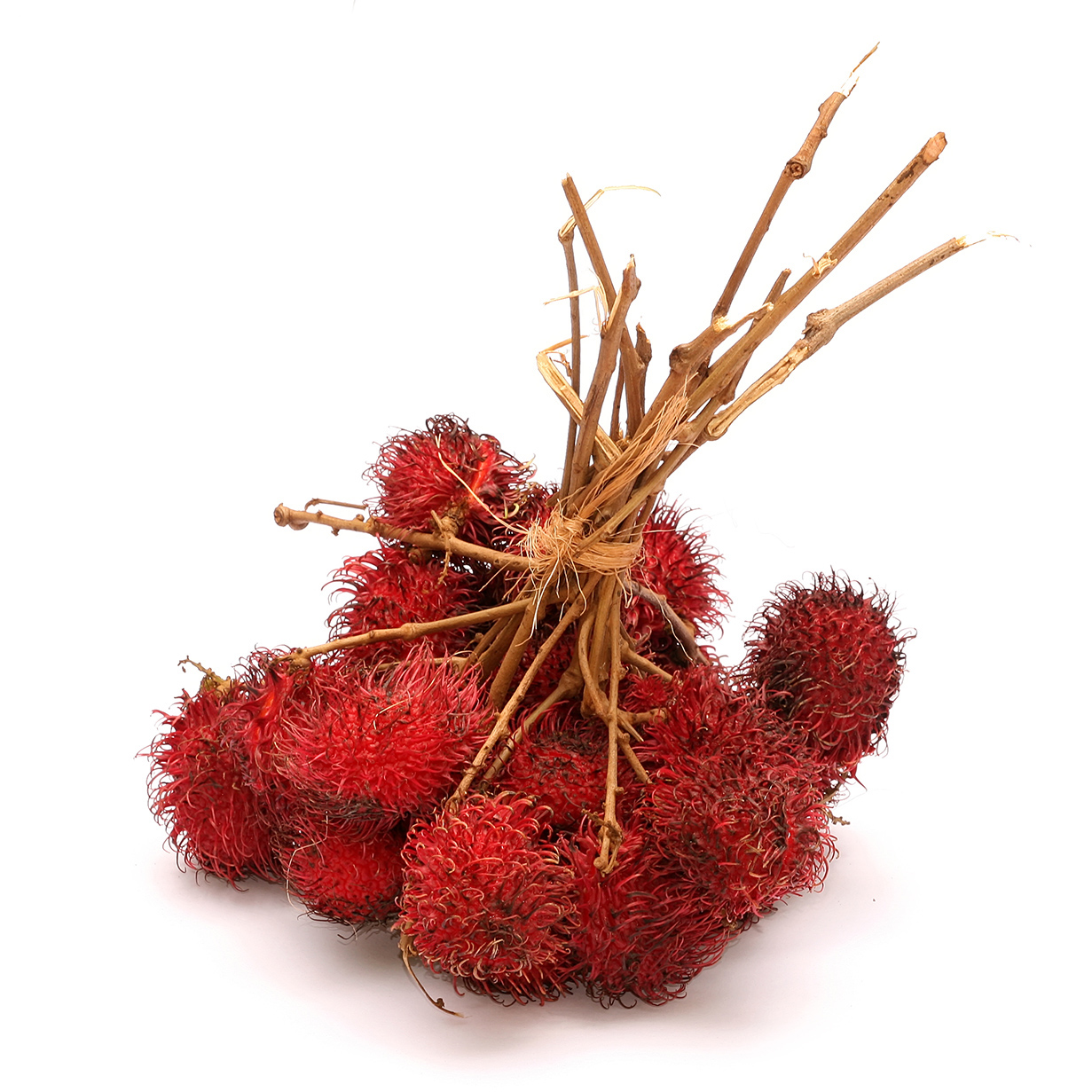
- Nephelium lappaceum fruits

Scientific classification
- Kingdom: Plantae
- Clade: Embryophytes
- Clade: Tracheophytes
- Clade: Angiosperms
- Clade: Eudicots
- Clade: Rosids
- Order: Sapindales
- Family: Sapindaceae
- Tribe: Nephelieae
- Genus: Nephelium; L.

Species
- See text

Synonyms
- Bima Noronha in Verh., 1790: nom. nud.; Dipherocarpus Llanos, 1859; Mesonephelium Pierre, 1897

= Nephelium =

Genus of trees

Nephelium is a genus of about 25 species of flowering plants in the family Sapindaceae, native to southeastern Asia.

They are evergreen trees with pinnately compound leaves, and edible drupaceous fruit; one species, N. lappaceum (rambutan) is commercially important for its fruit. The genus is closely related to Litchi and Dimocarpus.

== Species ==
Image	Scientific name	Common name	Distribution
	Nephelium aculeatum	Rambutan-utan	Borneo (Sabah)
	Nephelium chryseum		China, Borneo, the Philippines, and Vietnam
	Nephelium compressum		Borneo
	Nephelium costatum		Malaysia
	Nephelium cuspidatum	Lotong, sibau	Borneo
	Nephelium daedaleum		Borneo
	Nephelium hamulatum		Peninsular Malaysia
	Nephelium havilandii		Borneo (Sarawak)
	Nephelium hypoleucum	Korlan	Indo-China to Peninsular Malaysia (Kedah)
	Nephelium juglandifolium		Peninsular Malaysia to western Java
	Nephelium lappaceum	Rambutan	Thailand to western Malesia
	Nephelium laurinum		Southern Thailand to western Malesia
	Nephelium macrophyllum		Borneo
	Nephelium maingayi	Redan	Malay Peninsula, Sumatra and Borneo
	Nephelium meduseum		Borneo
	Nephelium malaiense		Philippines
	Nephelium melanomiscum syn. Nephelium xerospermoides	Hairless rambutan	Southern Indochina to Peninsular Malaysia
	Nephelium melliferum		Southern Indochina to Peninsular Malaysia
	Nephelium papillatum		Borneo (Sabah)
	Nephelium ramboutan-ake	Kapulasan	Peninsular Malaysia
	Nephelium reticulatum		Borneo
	Nephelium subfalcatum		Western Malesia
	Nephelium toong		Indochina
	Nephelium topengii		Hainan
	Nephelium uncinatum		Nicobar Islands to western Malesia
