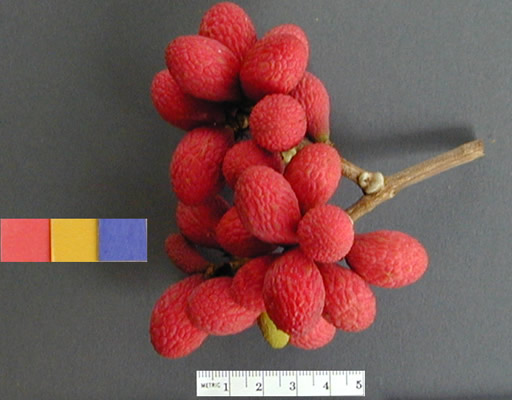
- Korlan fruits

Conservation status
- Least Concern (IUCN 3.1)

Scientific classification
- Kingdom: Plantae
- Clade: Tracheophytes
- Clade: Angiosperms
- Clade: Eudicots
- Clade: Rosids
- Order: Sapindales
- Family: Sapindaceae
- Genus: Nephelium
- Species: N. hypoleucum

Binomial name
- Nephelium hypoleucum Kurz

Synonyms
- Nephelium cochinchinense Pierre; Xerospermum cochinchinense Pierre; Xerospermum laoticum Gagnep.

= Nephelium hypoleucum =

Korlan

Species of tree

Nephelium hypoleucum, the korlan, is an evergreen tree in the family Sapindaceae. It is in the same genus as the rambutan and also closely related to several other tropical fruits including the lychee, longan, and guinep. The plant is native to Southeast Asia and lives wild in the jungles of the region.

== Tree description ==
Nephelium hypoleucum is an angiosperm tree. It can reach up to 30 meters tall, with the trunk growing to 1.4 meters in diameter. The leaflets are in pairs of 3 to 4. The margin of the leaflets are uneven and wavy. The leaves are alternate and have a spiral or whorled arrangement. The upper side of the leaf is usually smooth and the bottom is typically covered by a silky-like hair. The leaf can also have a domatium present for small insects or fungi. The flowers grow on an inflorescence and occur at the terminal position of the leaf axil in the upper region of the plant; they are small greenish flowers rich in nectar. The flower is unisexual, and the male flower can have anywhere from 7-10 stamen. Flowers have between 4 and 6 sepals and petals. Nephelium hypoleucum flowers from the months of December to March with fruit setting from February to June. It is grown in the wild in the mountain areas, but it can be propagated by seed or by air layering. The fruit is a round to oval drupe borne in a loose pendant cluster.

== Fruit description ==
The fruit is warty with a round to oval shape. It is drupe borne in a loose pendant cluster. It is a three-dimensional shape with a minimum of two axes that are equal. The warts on the fruit can be a linear or pyramidal shape which can get up to 1.5 mm (about 0.06 in) high. The pollinators of this fruit are insects; it is eaten by squirrels and primates such as monkeys, apes, and humans as well. The fruit has a fleshy texture and when the fruit is ripe it will turn a reddish color. The seed inside of the fruit has an edible white fleshy seedcoat.

== Taxonomy ==
Nephelium hypoleucum is in family Sapindaceae and genus Nephelium, with the common name korlan.

== Habitat ==
Nephelium hypoleucum will only grow in fertile sandy soil at high altitudes of up to 1200 meters (about 3937 ft), This species is mainly found in rainforests as well as savannah in a hilly country. It prefers to be in a tropical climate with high temperatures and high humidity.

== Uses ==
The fruit is commonly eaten fresh off the tree. Only the pulp is eaten due to the seed being poisonous and is described to have a sour taste. Unlike the other similar fruits in this family, the korlan is picked by the locals to be sold in small quantities due to it not being cultivated. Nephelium hypoleucum cannot be grown commercially and there is not a lot of information on the growth rate of this tree. The fruit is sometimes peeled and eaten with salt and chili powder, or fish sauce and sugar. Korlan is believed to have medicinal qualities such as reducing stress, regulating blood sugar, helping with digestion, and increasing resistance to the flu, viruses, colds and herpes, although these claims have not been evaluated by medical studies.
