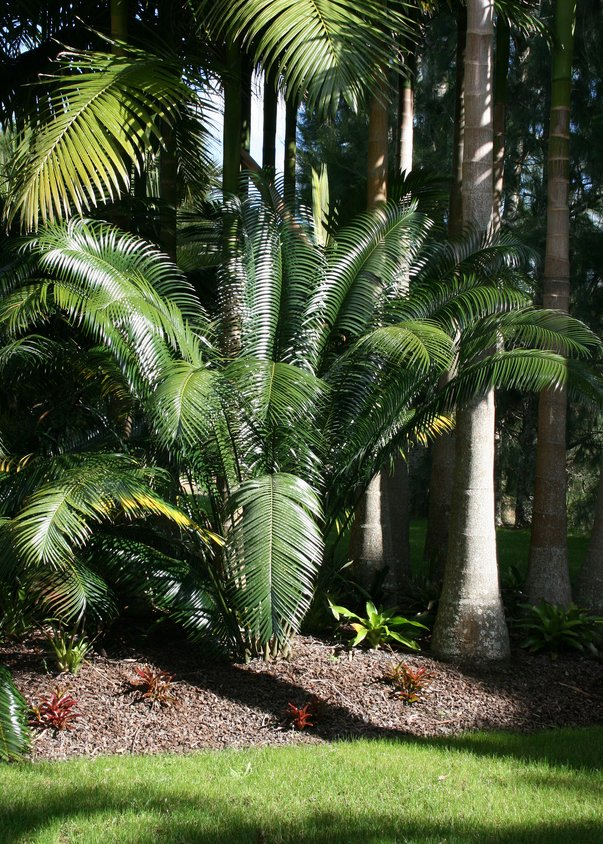
- Lepidozamia peroffskyana

Scientific classification
- Kingdom: Plantae
- Clade: Embryophytes
- Clade: Tracheophytes
- Clade: Spermatophytes
- Clade: Gymnosperms
- Division: Cycadophyta
- Class: Cycadopsida
- Order: Cycadales
- Family: Zamiaceae
- Subfamily: Encephalartoideae
- Tribe: Encephalarteae
- Subtribe: Macrozamiinae
- Genus: Lepidozamia; Regel

Type species
- Lepidozamia peroffskyana Regel

Synonyms
- Catakidozamia W.Hill

= Lepidozamia =

Genus of cycads endemic to Australia

Lepidozamia is a genus of two species of cycad, both endemic to Australia. They are native to rainforest climates in eastern Queensland and eastern New South Wales. They have a diploid chromosome number of 2n = 18.

== Species ==
Phylogeny of Lepidozamia

- - L. hopei (Hill ) Regel
  - - Macrozamia fawcettii Moore
    - L. peroffskyana Regel

Image	Scientific name	Distribution	Leaf	Cone
	Lepidozamia hopei (W.Hill) Regel	northern Queensland		
	Lepidozamia peroffskyana Regel	southeastern Queensland, northeastern New South Wales		

A specimen of L. hopei is known as the tallest living cycad at 17.5 m tall. These cycads are generally unbranched, tall, and with persistent leaf bases. They are easily cultivated as ornamental plants and are relatively cold hardy; L. peroffskyana was first described by a specimen grown at Saint Petersburg Botanical Garden in 1857.

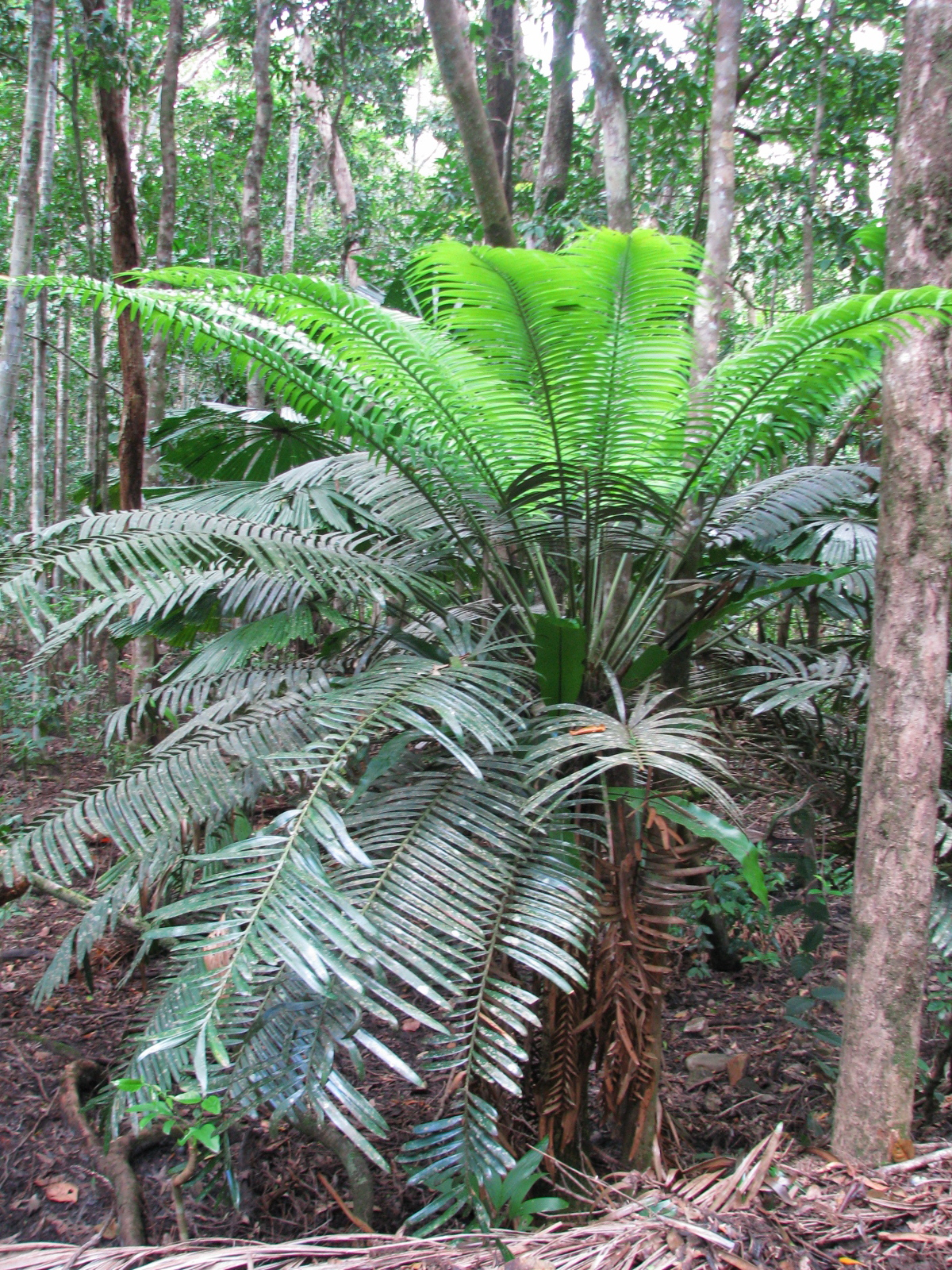
L. hopei in understorey of the Daintree Rainforest, north-east Queensland

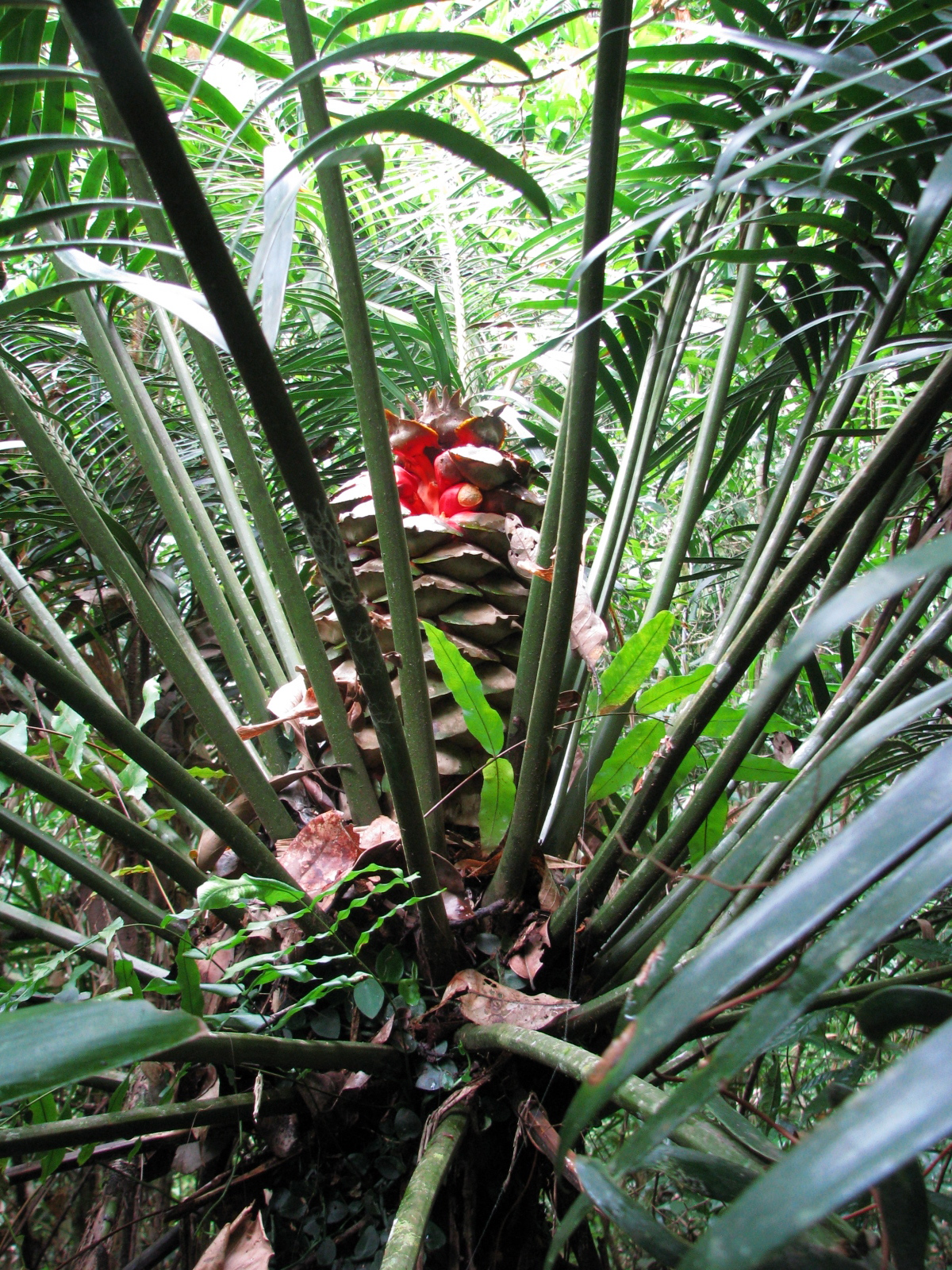
L. hopei: female plant with disintegrating cone containing seeds

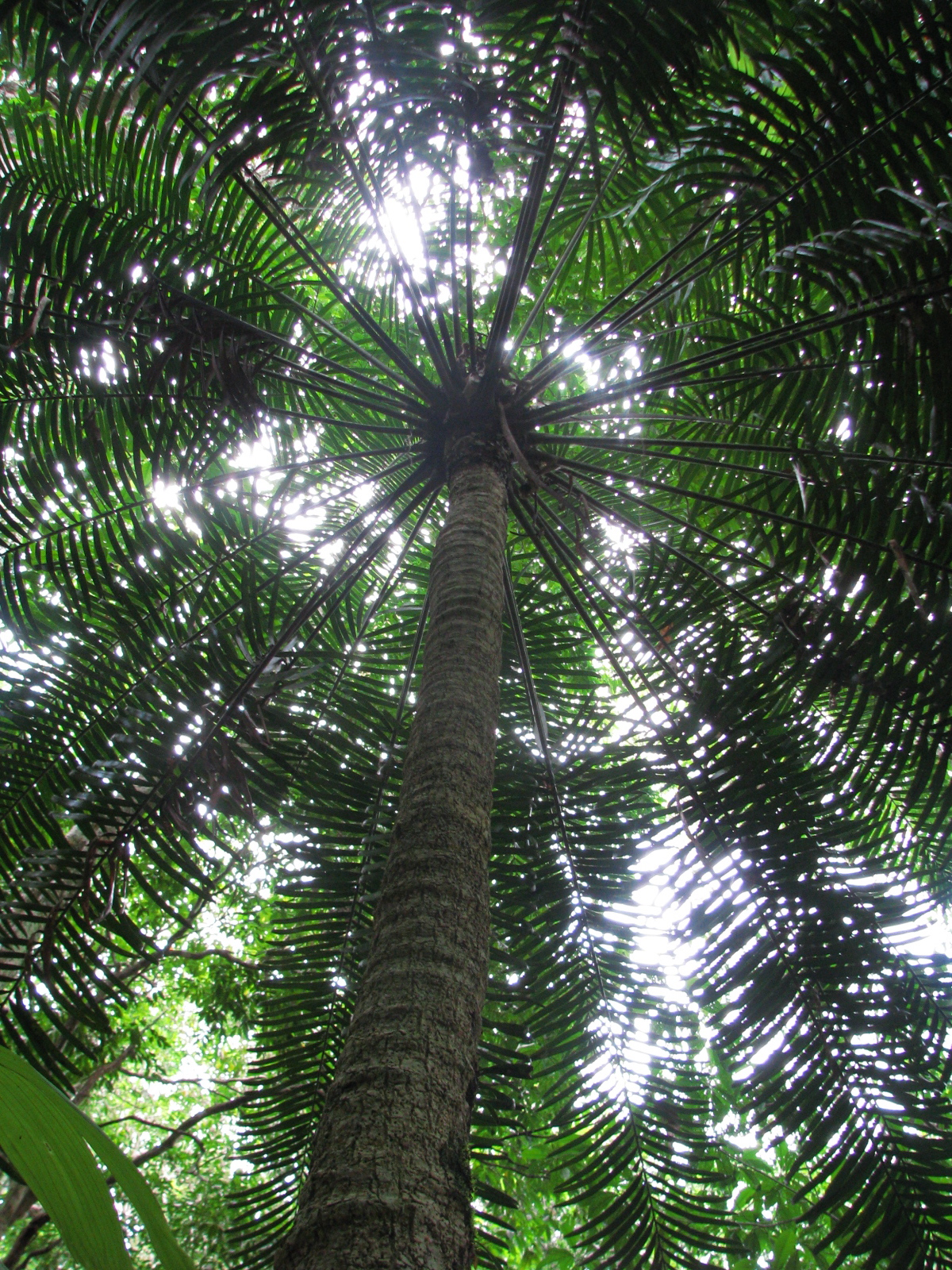
L. hopei: tall plant in the Daintree Rainforest, north-east Queensland
