= Nephelium juglandifolium =

Scientific classification
- Kingdom: Plantae
- Clade: Tracheophytes
- Clade: Angiosperms
- Clade: Eudicots
- Clade: Rosids
- Order: Sapindales
- Family: Sapindaceae
- Genus: Nephelium
- Species: N. juglandifolium

Binomial name
- Nephelium juglandifolium Blume

Species of shrub

Nephelium juglandifolium is a species of shrub. The drupe fruit is not as round as the other fruits within this genus. The shrub produces small flowers. The plants are grown in parks as decorative ornamental plants. In its natural environment, N. juglandifolium grows in lowland forests. It is usually 30m tall when fully grown.
