= Nephelium costatum =

Conservation status
- Vulnerable (IUCN 2.3)

Scientific classification
- Kingdom: Plantae
- Clade: Tracheophytes
- Clade: Angiosperms
- Clade: Eudicots
- Clade: Rosids
- Order: Sapindales
- Family: Sapindaceae
- Genus: Nephelium
- Species: N. costatum

Binomial name
- Nephelium costatum Hiern

Species of tree

Nephelium costatum is a species of plant in the family Sapindaceae. It is a tree endemic to Peninsular Malaysia. It is threatened by habitat loss.
