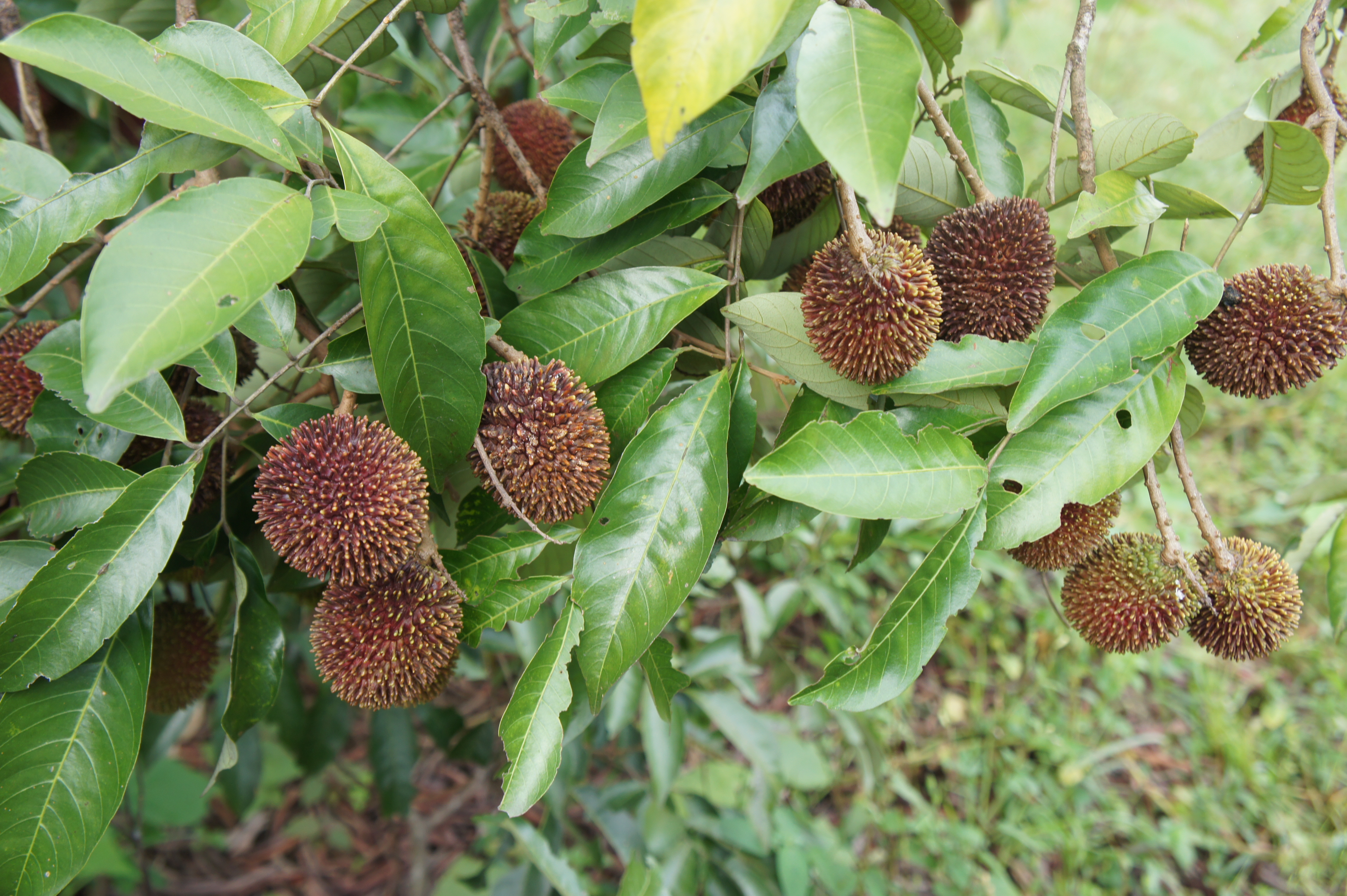

Scientific classification
- Kingdom: Plantae
- Clade: Embryophytes
- Clade: Tracheophytes
- Clade: Angiosperms
- Clade: Eudicots
- Clade: Rosids
- Order: Sapindales
- Family: Sapindaceae
- Genus: Nephelium
- Species: N. ramboutan-ake

Binomial name
- Nephelium ramboutan-ake (Labill.) Leenh.

Synonyms
- Litchi ramboutan-ake Labill.; Nephelium mutabile Blume

= Pulasan =

Genus of trees

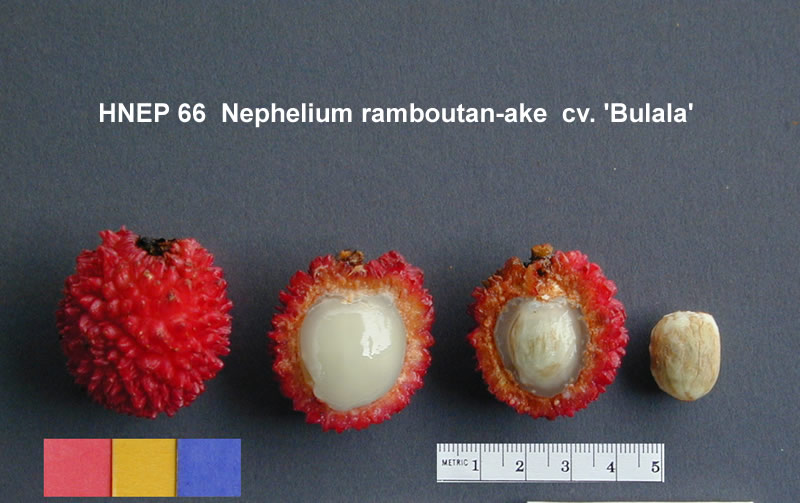
Fruit

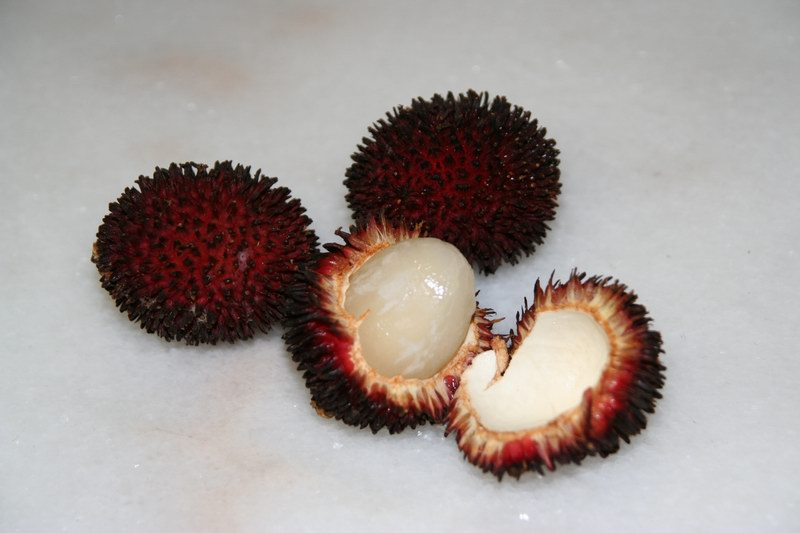
A trio of pulasan fruits, one of which has been opened to reveal the sweet edible flesh.

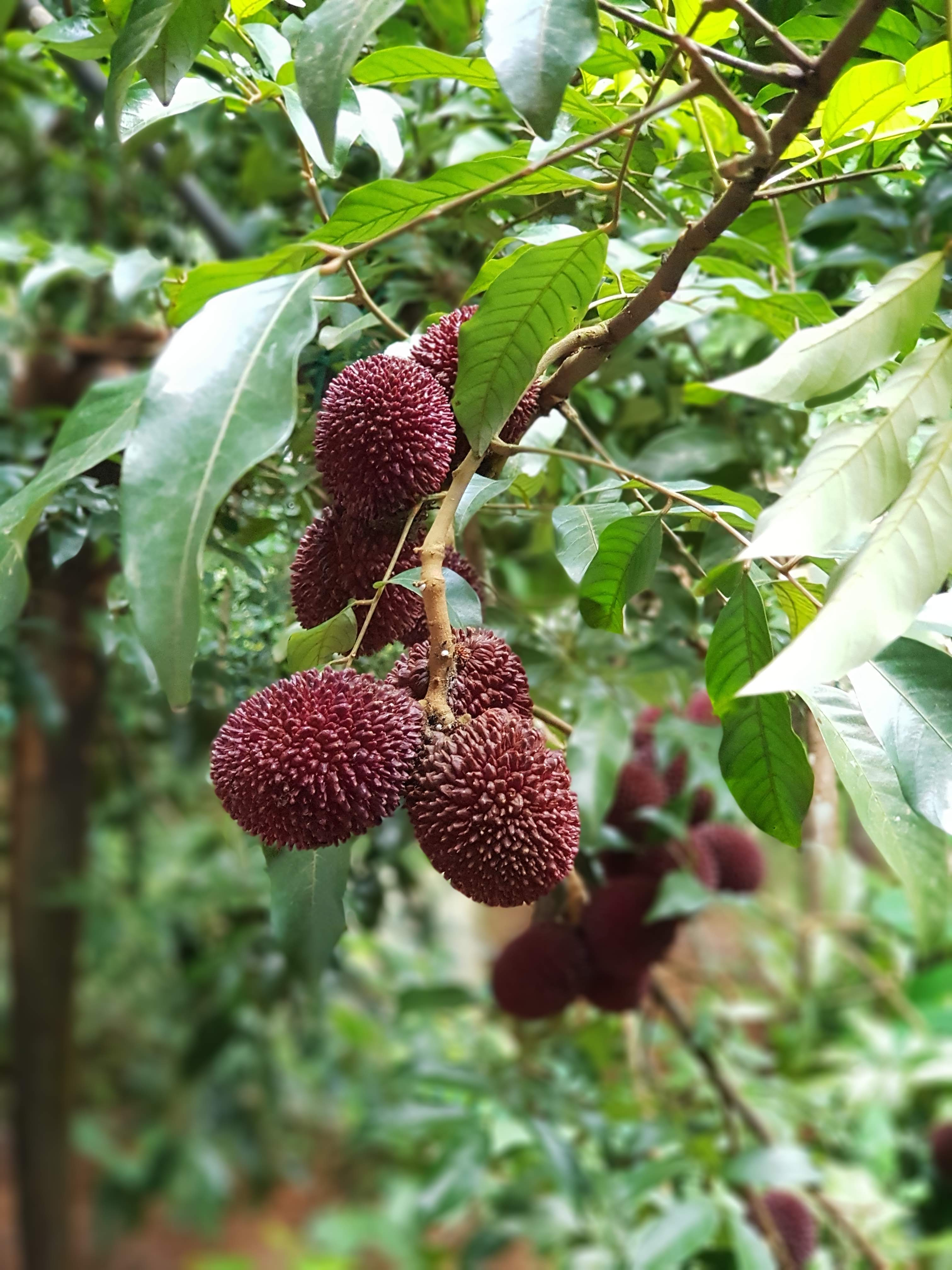
Pulasan tree with ripe fruits photographed in Kerala

Nephelium ramboutan-ake, the pulasan, is a tropical fruit in the family Sapindaceae. It is closely related to the rambutan and sometimes confused with it. Other related soapberry family fruits include lychee and longan. Usually eaten fresh, it is sweeter than the rambutan and lychee, but very rare outside Southeast Asia.

The name pulasan comes from Malay: pulas 'to twist' (cognate to Visayan pulas 'to take off, remove' and Tagalog pilas 'to rip, tear'). by how the fruit is opened twisting it with both hands, hence pulasan.

== Description ==
The pulasan tree is an ornamental. It attains a height of 10–15 m and has a short trunk to 30–40 cm thick. The branchlets are brown and hairy when young. The alternate leaves, pinnate or odd-pinnate, are 17–45 cm long, have 2 to 5 pairs of opposite or nearly opposite leaflets, are oblong or elliptic-lanceolate, 6.25-17.5 cm long and up to 5 cm wide; slightly wavy, dark-green and barely glossy on the upper surface; pale, and somewhat bluish, with a few short, silky hairs on the underside. Very small, greenish, petalless flowers with 4-5 hairy sepals are borne singly or in clusters on the branches of the erect, axillary or terminal, panicles clothed with fine yellowish or brownish hairs.

The pulasan is ultra-tropical and thrives only in humid regions between 360 and 1,150 ft (110–350 m) of altitude. In Malaysia, it is said that the tree bears best after a long, dry season.

The fruit is ovoid, 5-7.5 cm long, dark red, with its thick, leathery rind closely set with conical, blunt-tipped tubercles or thick, fleshy, straight spines, which are up to 1 cm long. There may be one or two small, undeveloped fruits nestled close to the stem. Within is the glistening, white or yellowish-white flesh (aril) to 1 cm thick, more or less clinging to the thin, grayish-brown seedcoat (testa) which separates from the seed. The flavor is generally much sweeter than that of the rambutan. The seed is ovoid, oblong or ellipsoid, light brown, somewhat flattened on one side, and 2 to 3.5 cm long.

While similar to rambutan, the fruit lacks the hairy spines. The flesh is sweet and juicy, and separates easily from the seed, much more easily than the rambutan. In addition, unlike the seed of the rambutan, the seed of the pulasan is readily edible raw. It has a flavor somewhat like that of almonds.

== Habitat and distribution ==
The pulasan is native to Malay Peninsula and other parts of tropical Southeast Asia. Wild trees are infrequent in lowland forests around Perak, Malaysia but abundant in the Philippines at low elevations from Luzon to Mindanao. The tree has long been cultivated in the Malay Peninsula and Thailand; is rarely domesticated in the Philippines. Ochse reported that there were extensive plantings in Java only around Bogor and the villages along the railway between Bogor and the capital Jakarta.

The tree was planted at the Trujillo Plant Propagation Station in Puerto Rico in 1926 and young trees from Java were sent to the Lancetilla Experimental Garden, Tela, Honduras, in 1927. The latter were said in 1945 to be doing well at Tela and fruiting moderately. The pulasan is little known elsewhere in the New World except in Costa Rica where it is occasionally grown and the fruits sometimes appear on the market.

== Ecology ==
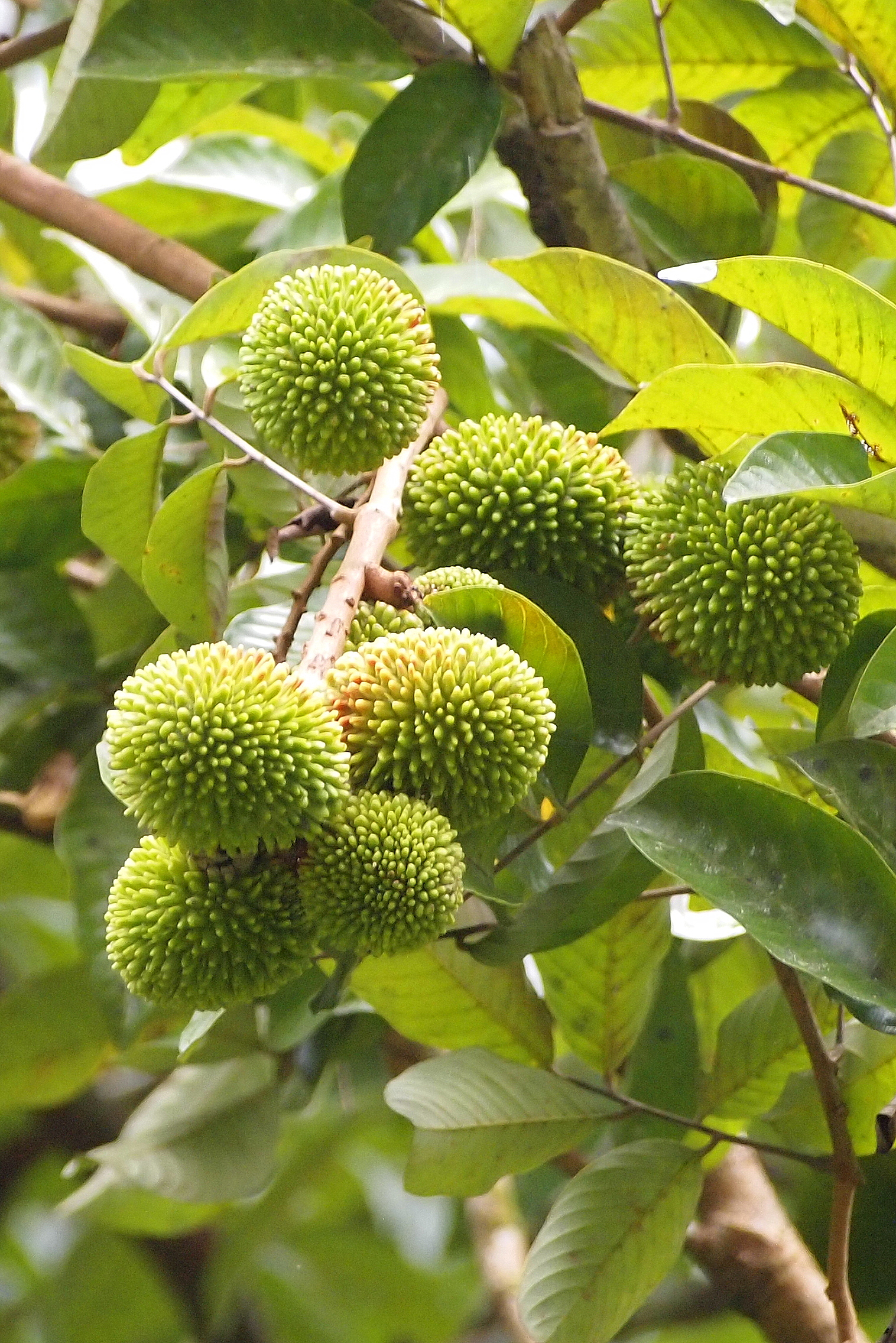
Unripe pulasan in Malaysia

Like its relatives, pulasan can be propagated by seed and grafting methods. Grafting is a common practice among horticulturalists that often is a proactive method of preventing disease, by using healthy rootstocks. Though starting by seed can be successful, most producers will not use this method of propagation due to variation in gender, which causes chance in having an actual fruiting tree.

Of the pulasan flower parts, the anther cannot open on its own; this means that the plant cannot pollinate itself. Certain trees will have hermaphrodite flowers, and others will have staminate flowers. Generally this means hermaphrodites will take on female roles as the staminates take male, in the pollination process.

Pulasan skin is unique for its color; it offers a natural dye, one that has recently been the specimen of studies dealing with electrical conductivity and its potential in renewable energy (see OSC's).
