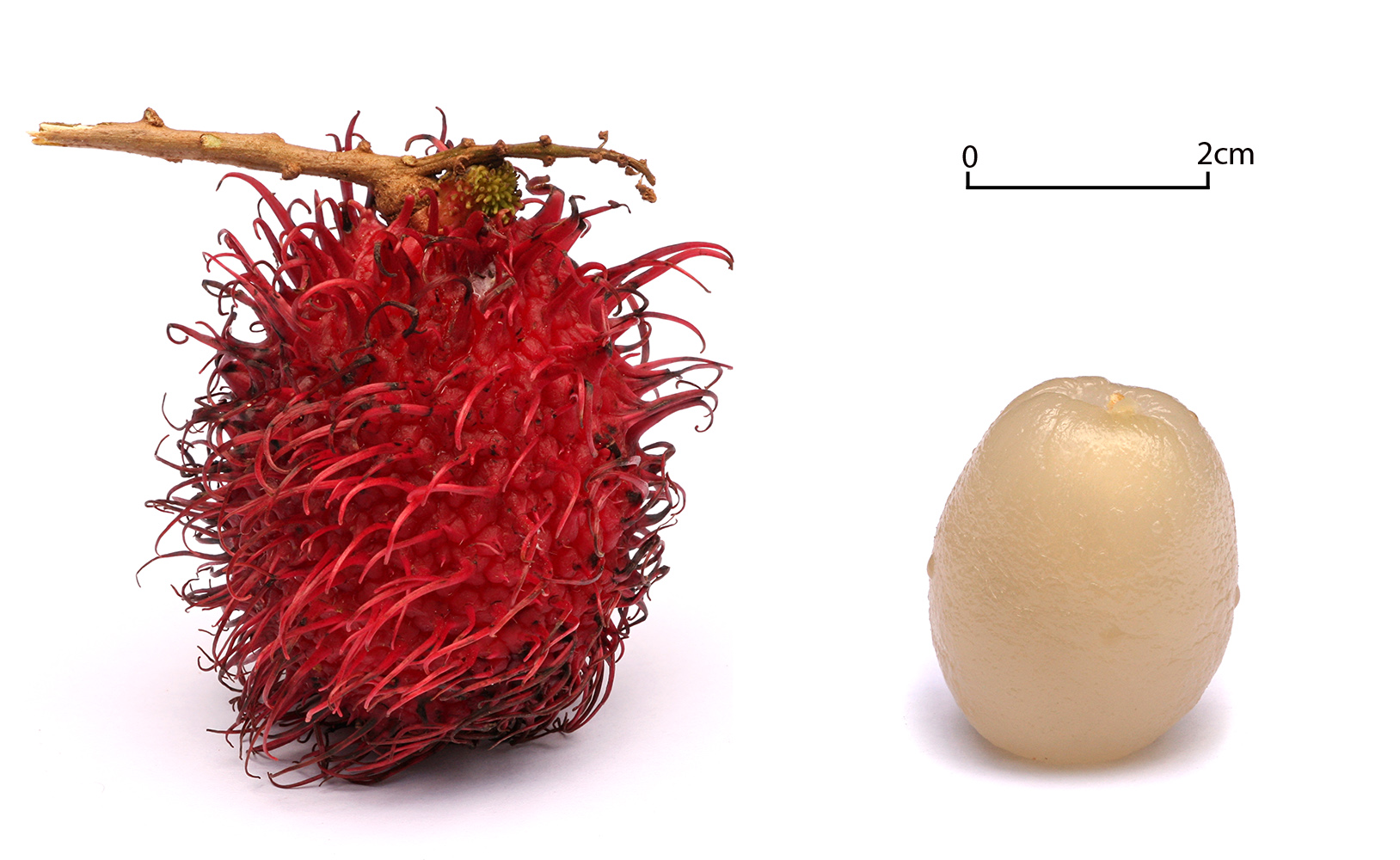
- Unpeeled and peeled rambutan fruit
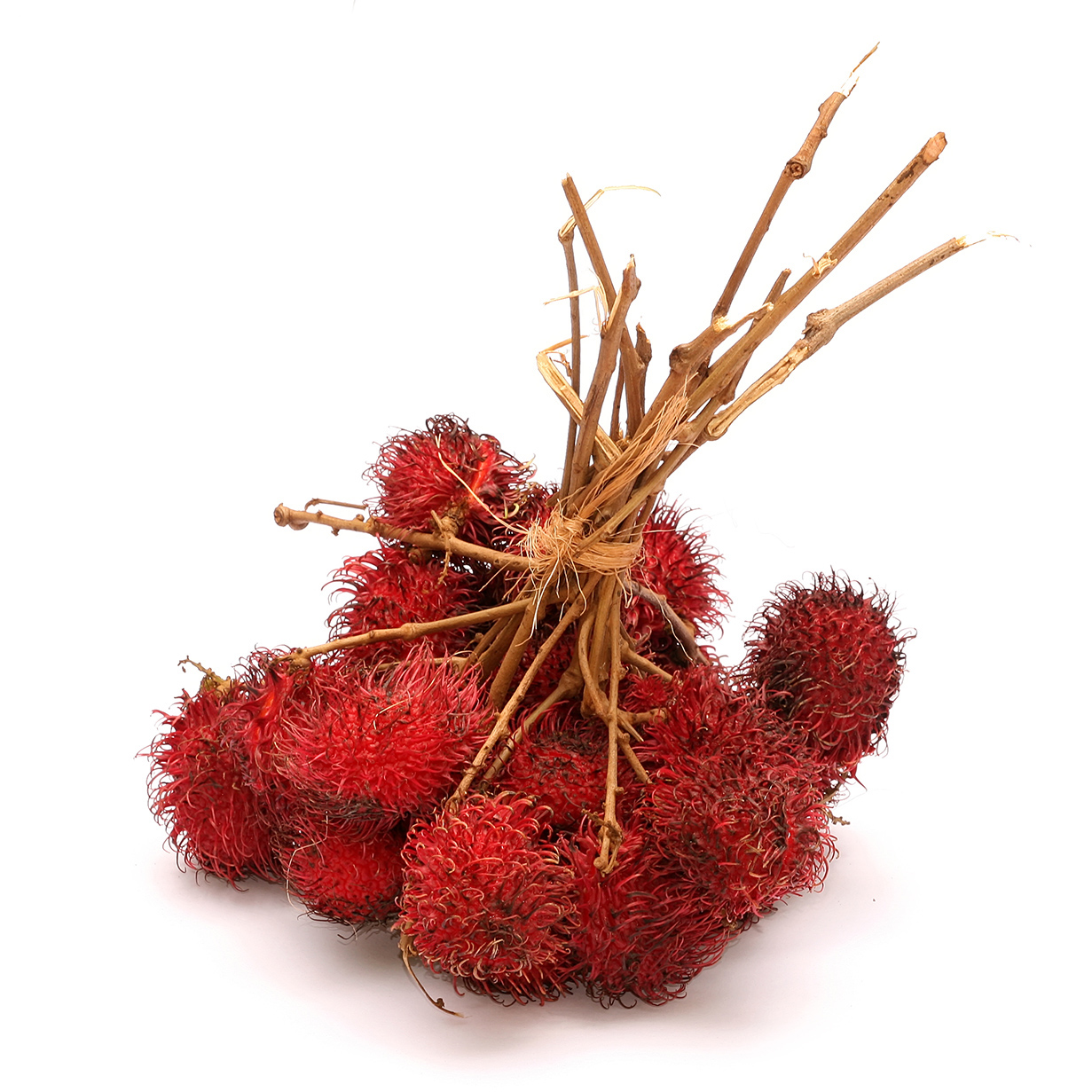
- Rambutan fruits

Conservation status
- Least Concern (IUCN 3.1)

Scientific classification
- Kingdom: Plantae
- Clade: Tracheophytes
- Clade: Angiosperms
- Clade: Eudicots
- Clade: Rosids
- Order: Sapindales
- Family: Sapindaceae
- Genus: Nephelium
- Species: N. lappaceum

Binomial name
- Nephelium lappaceum L.

Synonyms
- List: Dimocarpus crinitus Lour.; Euphoria glabra Blume; Euphoria nephelium DC.; Nephelium obovatum Ridl.; Nephelium pallens Radlk.; Nephelium rambutan Schnizl.; Scytalia crinita Raeusch.; Scytalia rimosa Roxb.

= Rambutan =

Southeast Asian fruit

Rambutan (/ræmˈbuːtən/; Nephelium lappaceum) is a medium-sized tropical tree in the family Sapindaceae, and the edible fruit of this tree. The fruit is sweet, with a hairy leathery rind and a single seed. The rambutan is native to Southeast Asia; its centre of diversity is in Indonesia.

== Etymology ==
The name rambutan is derived from the Malay word rambut meaning 'hair', for hairy protuberances on the fruits, with the noun-building suffix -an.

== Description ==
The rambutan is closely related to several other edible tropical fruits, including the lychee, longan, pulasan, and quenepa.

=== Tree ===
The rambutan is an evergreen tree growing to a height of 15–24 m (49–79 ft). The leaves are alternate, 7–30 cm (3–12 in) long, pinnate, with one to four pairs of leaflets, each leaflet 5–20 cm (2–8 in) wide and 2.5–11 cm (0.98–4.33 in) broad. The flowers are small, without petals, and borne in erect terminal panicle clusters. Rambutan trees can be male (producing only staminate flowers and, hence, produce no fruit) or female (producing flowers that are only functionally female).

Foliage

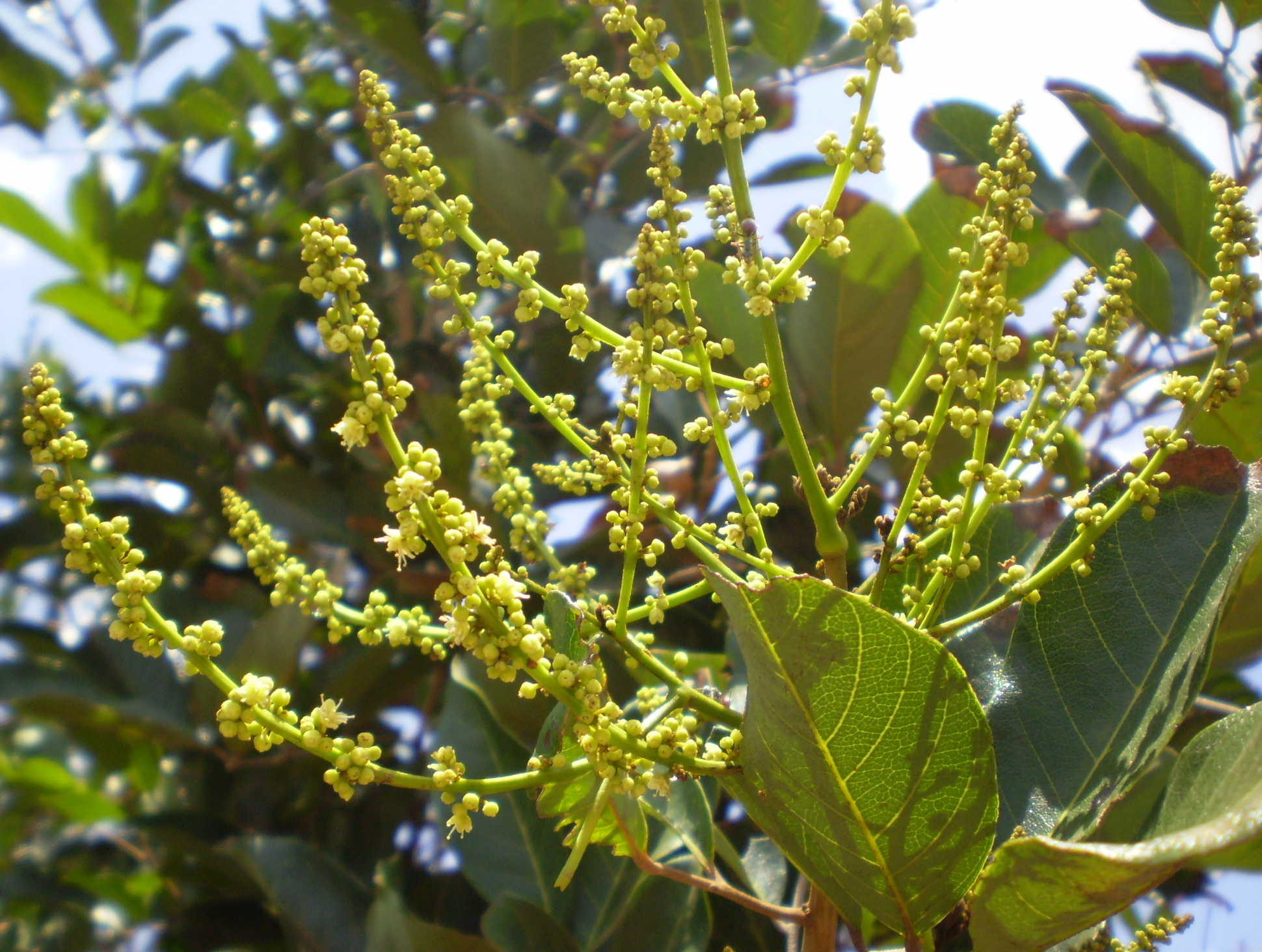
Inflorescence, a panicle

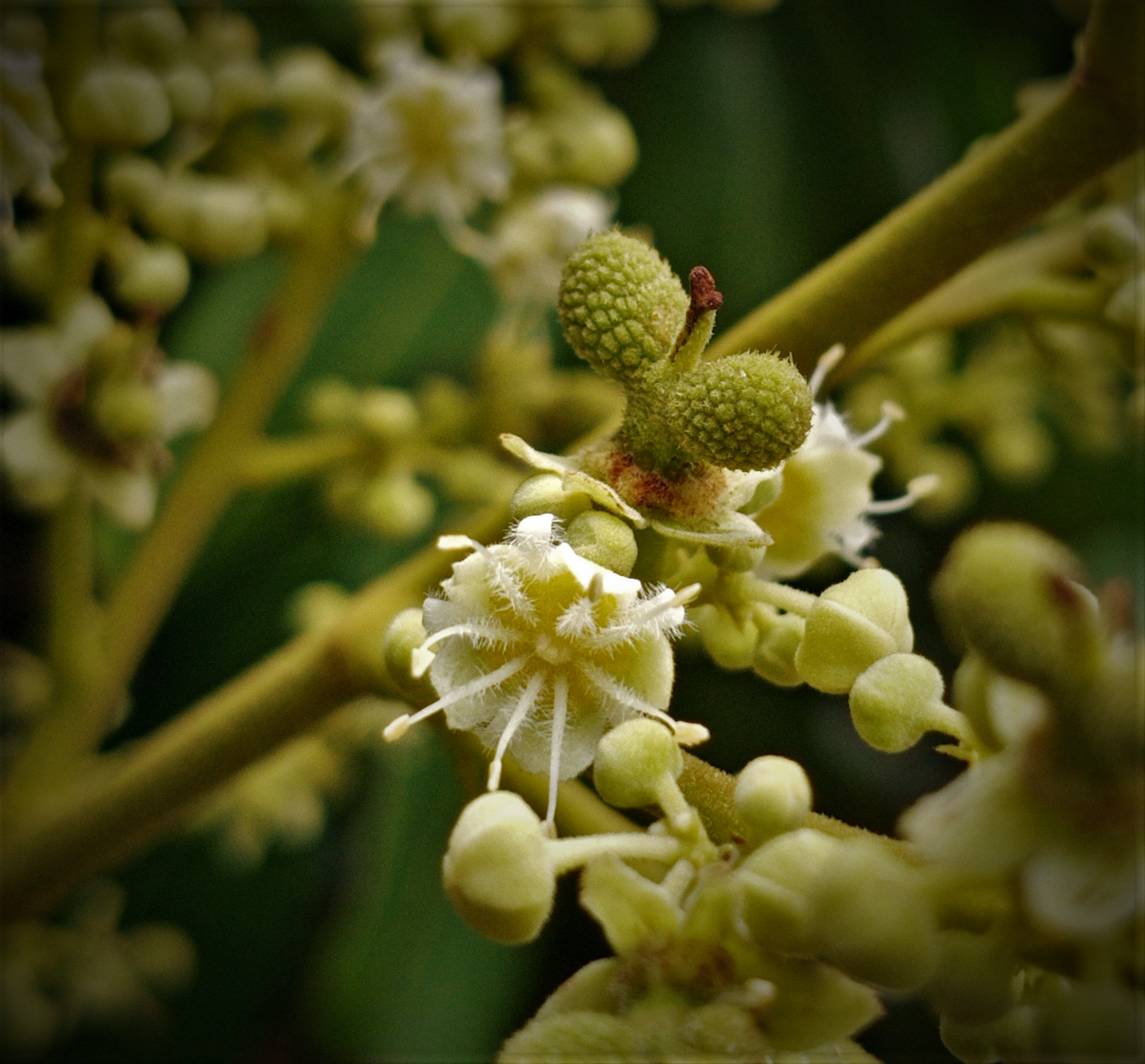
Staminate (male) flower in front of a fertilised hermaphrodite flower, on a hermaphroditic tree

=== Fruit ===
The fruit is a round to oval single-seeded drupe, 3–6 cm (1 1/4–2 1/4 in) long, rarely to 8 cm (3 1/4 in) long and 3–4 cm (1 1/4–1 1/2 in) broad, borne in a loose pendant cluster of ten to twenty fruits together. The leathery skin is reddish (rarely orange or yellow) and covered with fleshy pliable spines, hence the name, which means 'hairy'. The spines (or "spinterns") allow the fruit to transpire water out into its surrounding environment; water loss can affect the fruit's quality. The seed is sometimes eaten, but is bitter and has narcotic properties.

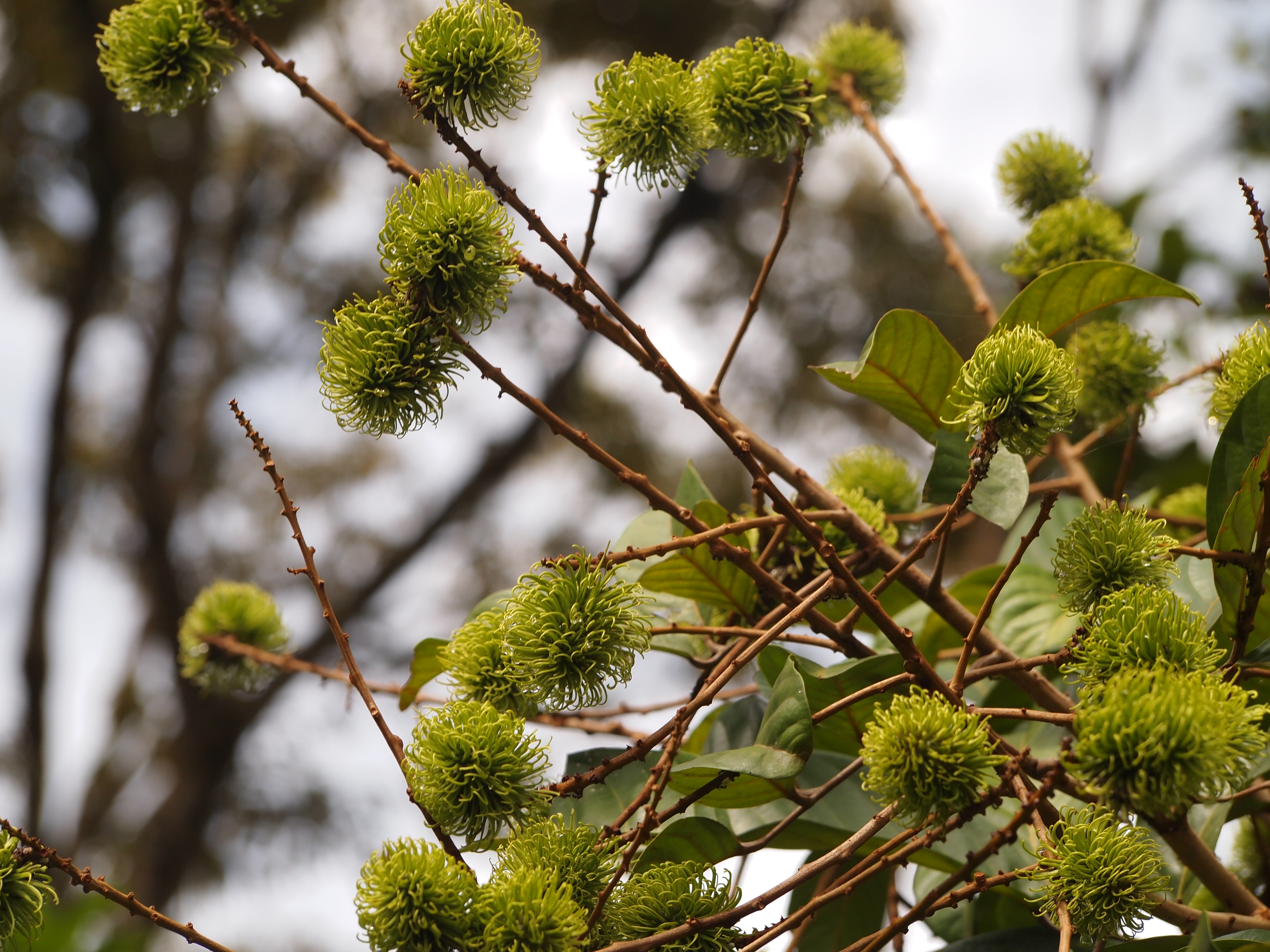
Young fruits in Malaysia

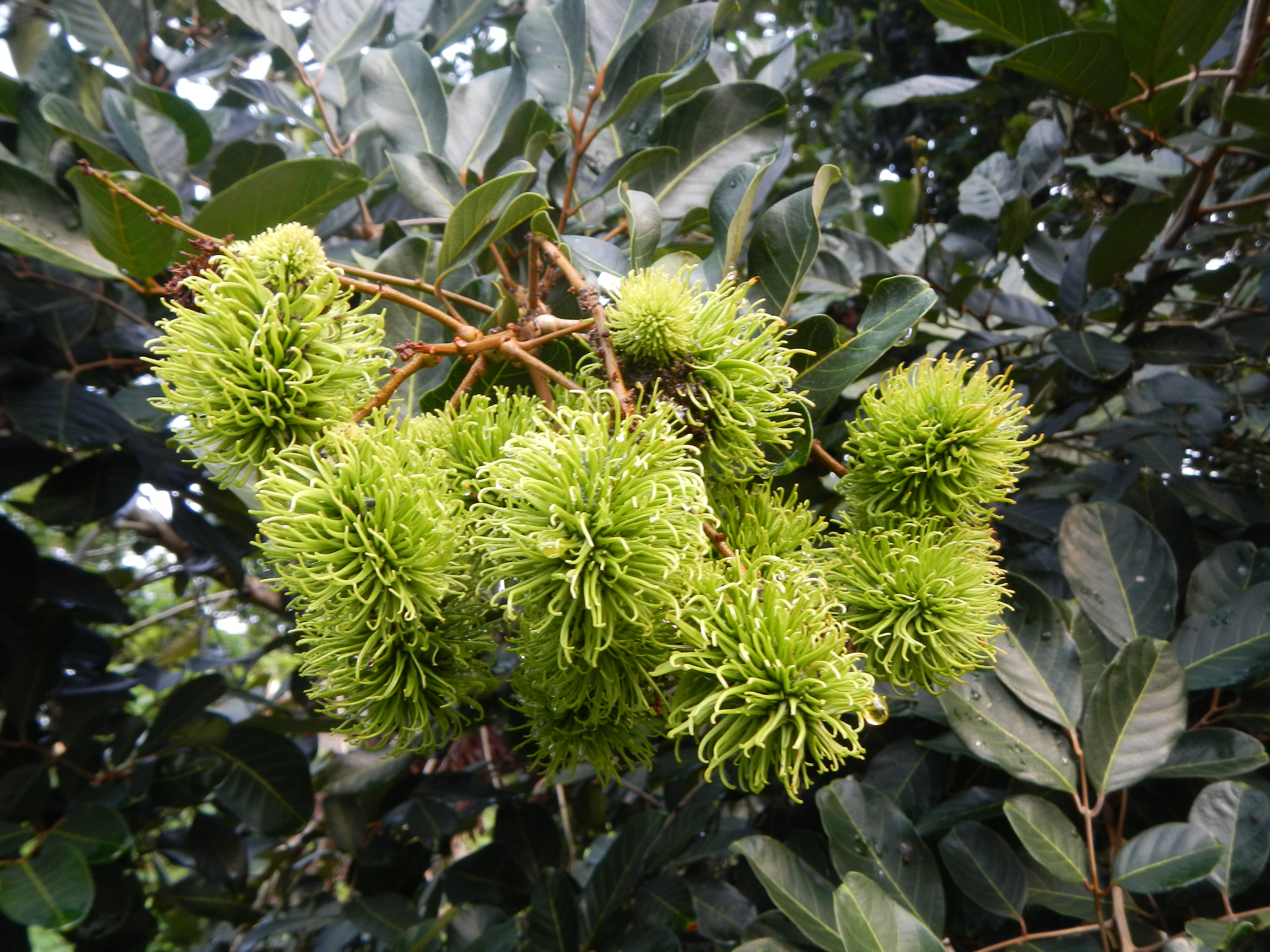
Unripe fruits in the Philippines

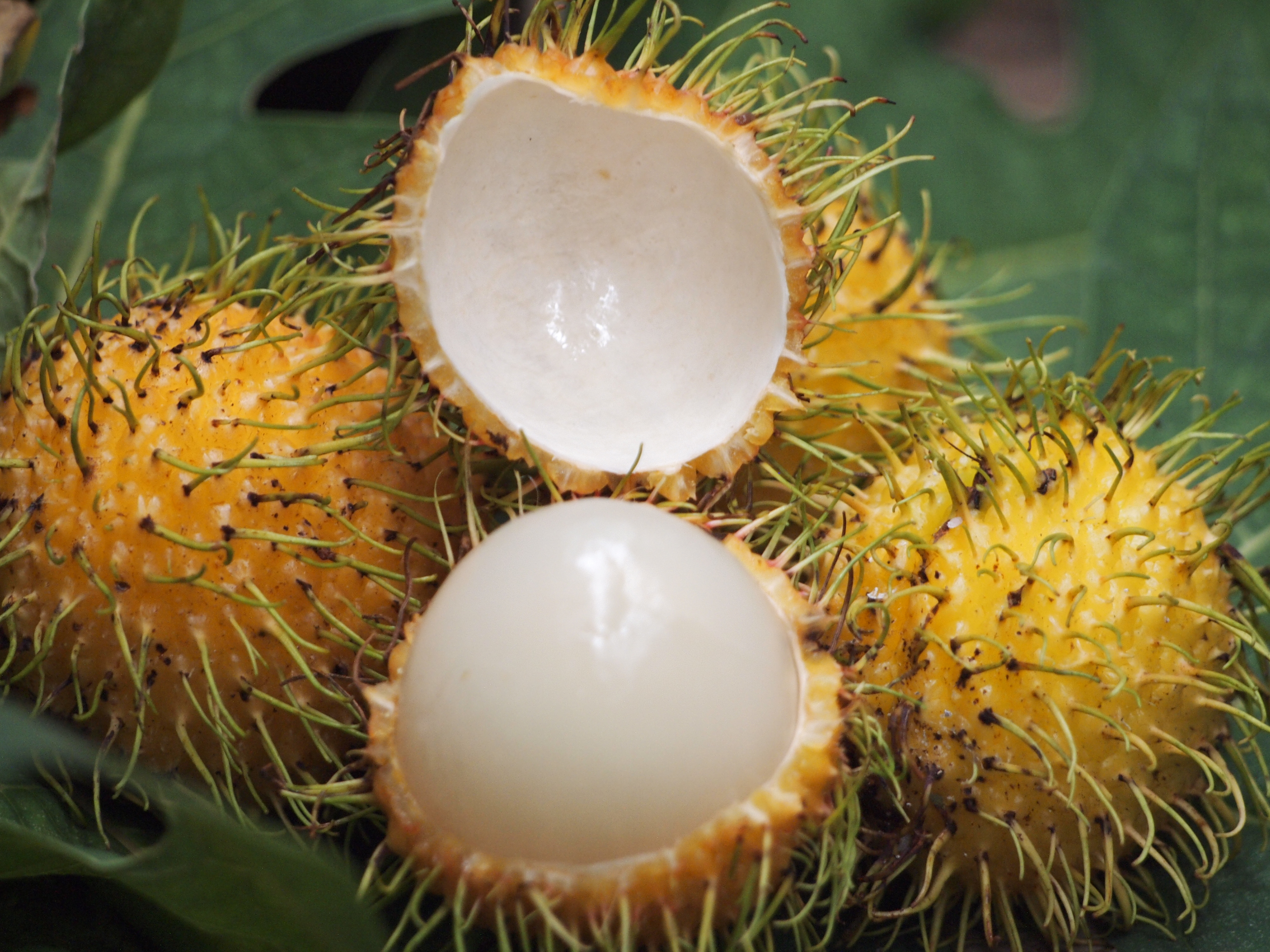
Ripe yellow fruits in Malaysia

== History ==
Around the 13th to 15th centuries, Arab traders, who played a major role in Indian Ocean trade, introduced rambutans to Zanzibar and Pemba in East Africa. In the 19th century, the Dutch introduced rambutans from Indonesia in Southeast Asia, to Suriname in South America. Subsequently, the plants spread to the tropical Americas, planted in the coastal lowlands of Colombia, Ecuador, Honduras, Costa Rica, Trinidad, and Cuba. In 1912, rambutans were introduced to the Philippines from Indonesia. Further introductions were made in 1920 (from Indonesia) and 1930 (from Malaya), but until the 1950s its distribution was limited. An unsuccessful attempt was made to introduce the tree to the Southeastern United States, with seeds imported from Java in 1906.

== Composition ==
Rambutan, canned, syrup pack
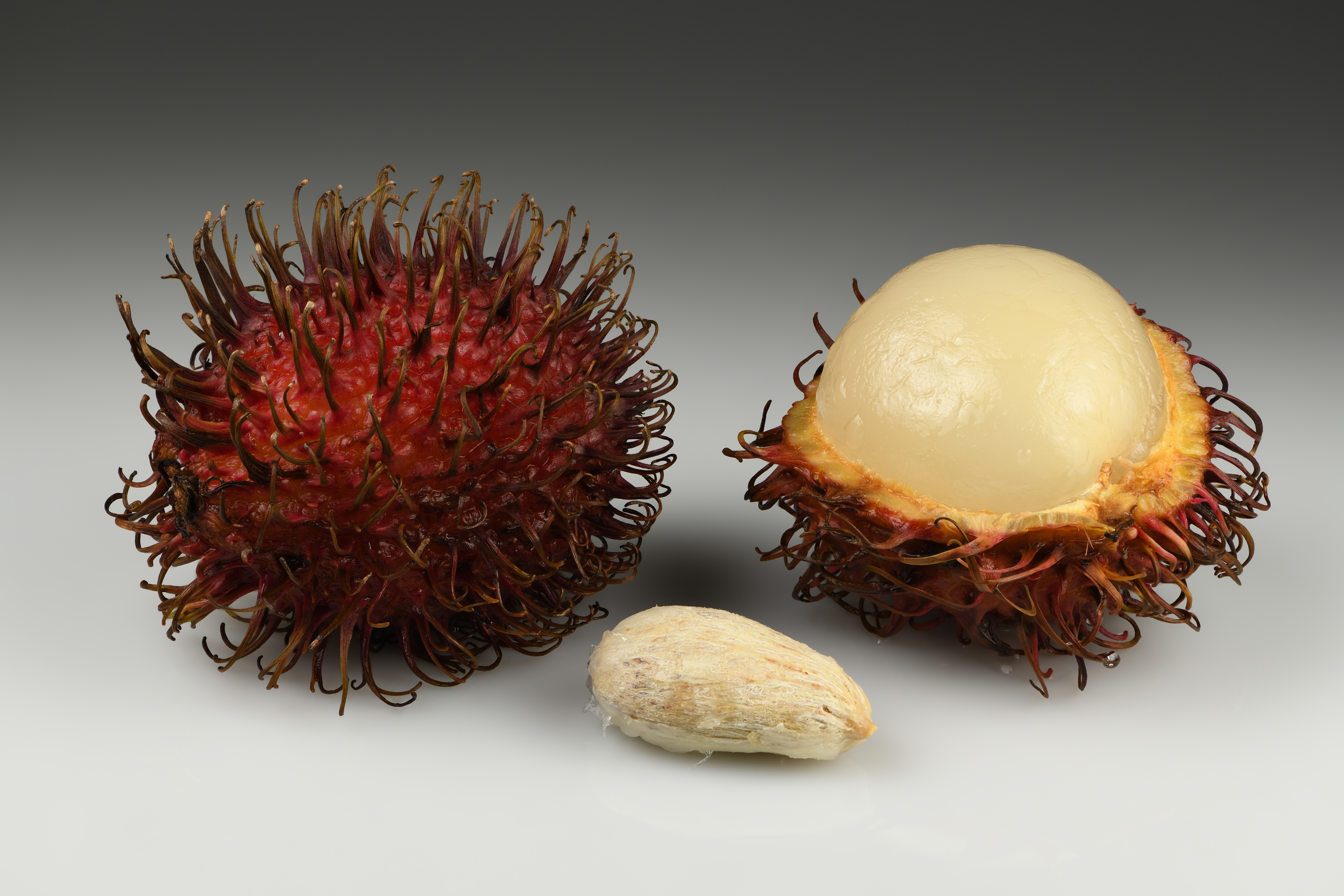

Nutritional value per 100 g (3.5 oz)
- Energy: 343 kJ (82 kcal)
- Carbohydrates: 20.87 g
- Dietary fiber: 0.9 g
- Fat: 0.21 g
- Protein: 0.65 g
Vitamins and minerals
Vitamins	Quantity %DV^{†}
Thiamine (B1)	1% 0.013 mg
Riboflavin (B2)	2% 0.022 mg
Niacin (B3)	8% 1.352 mg
Vitamin B6	1% 0.02 mg
Folate (B9)	2% 8 μg
Vitamin C	5% 4.9 mg
Minerals	Quantity %DV^{†}
Calcium	2% 22 mg
Iron	2% 0.35 mg
Magnesium	2% 7 mg
Manganese	15% 0.343 mg
Phosphorus	1% 9 mg
Potassium	1% 42 mg
Sodium	0% 11 mg
Zinc	1% 0.08 mg
- Other constituents: Quantity
- Water: 78.3 g
- Link to USDA Database entry
- ^{†}Percentages estimated using US recommendations for adults, except for potassium, which is estimated based on expert recommendation from the National Academies.

=== Nutrients ===
Rambutan fruit is 78% water, 21% carbohydrates, 1% protein, and has negligible fat (see table; data are for canned fruit in syrup; raw fruit data are unpublished). In a reference amount of 100 g (3.5 oz), the canned fruit supplies 82 calories and only manganese at 15% of the Daily Value (DV), while other micronutrients are in low content (less than 10% DV, table).

=== Phytochemicals ===
As an un-pigmented fruit flesh, rambutan does not contain significant polyphenol content, but its colorful rind displays diverse phenolic acids, such as syringic, coumaric, gallic, caffeic, and ellagic acids. Rambutan seeds contain equal proportions of saturated and unsaturated fatty acids, where arachidic (34%) and oleic (42%) acids, respectively, are the highest in fat content.

The pleasant fragrance of rambutan fruit derives from numerous volatile organic compounds, including beta-damascenone, vanillin, phenylacetic acid, and cinnamic acid.

== Varieties ==
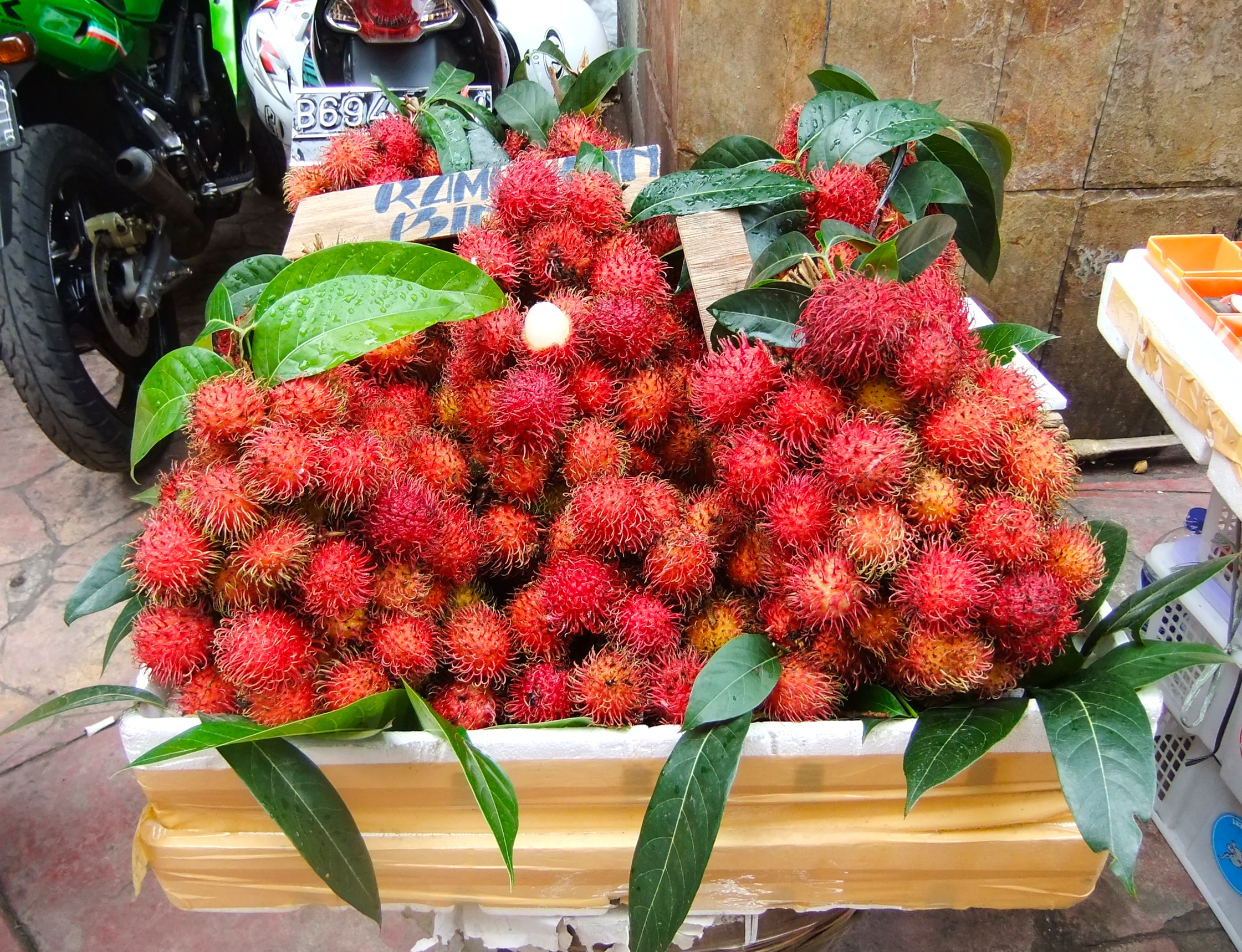
The Binjai cultivar in Indonesia

Well over 200 cultivars have been developed from selected clones across tropical Asia. Compared to propagated rambutan clones, rambutans taken from the wild have a higher acidity. In Indonesia, 22 rambutan cultivars were identified as good quality, with five as leading commercial cultivars: 'Binjai', 'Lebak Bulus', 'Rapiah', 'Cimacan' and 'Sinyonya', with other popular cultivars including 'Simacan', 'Silengkeng', 'Sikonto' and 'Aceh kuning'. In the Malay Peninsula, commercial varieties include 'Chooi Ang', 'Peng Thing Bee', 'Ya Tow', 'Azimat', and 'Ayer Mas'.

In the Philippines, there are five genotypic clusters of rambutan, corresponding to the cultivars Maharlika, Seenjonja, Seematjan, Roja/JMG-R5, and a group of the "smallest but sweetest fruits".

== Uses ==
The flesh of the rambutan may be eaten raw by splitting the peel. It can be stewed or canned to provide a dessert. A jam is made in Malaysia, with the flesh cooked with sugar and cloves. The seed is high in fatty acids, especially oleic acid and arachidic acid, and used in the manufacture of soap. The roots, bark, and leaves are used in traditional medicine.

== Cultivation ==
Rambutans are grown commercially within 12–15° of the equator. The trees grow well at elevations up to 500 m (1,600 ft) above sea level and do best in deep soil, clay loam, or sandy loam rich in organic matter. They grow on hilly terrain where there is good drainage.

Rambutans can be grown from seed, but since as many as 2/3 of the resulting trees are male, and most of the female trees are unproductive, vegetative propagation with some form of grafting on to a rootstock is essential for commercial production. Air-layering and traditional graft methods such as cleft-grafting are described as not very satisfactory; budding works much better.

In some areas, rambutan trees bear fruit twice annually, once in late fall and early winter, with a shorter season in late spring and early summer. Other areas, such as Costa Rica, have a single fruit season, with the start of the rainy season in April stimulating flowering, and the fruit is usually ripe in August and September. The fragile fruit must ripen on the tree, then they are harvested over a four- to seven-week period. The fresh fruit are easily bruised and have a limited shelf life. An average tree may produce 5,000–6,000 or more fruit (60–70 kg or 130–155 lb per tree). Yields begin at 1.2 tonnes per hectare (0.54 short tons per acre) in young orchards and may reach 20 tonnes per hectare (8.9 short tons per acre) on mature trees. In Hawaii, 24 hectares (59 acres) of 38 cultivated hectares (94 acres) were harvested producing 120 tonnes (130 short tons) of fruit in 1997. Yields can be increased by improved orchard management, including pollination, and by planting high-yielding compact cultivars.

Most commercial cultivars are hermaphroditic; cultivars that produce only functionally female flowers require the presence of male trees.

In Thailand, rambutan trees were first planted in Surat Thani in 1926 by the Chinese Malay K. Vong in Ban Na San. An annual rambutan fair is held during August harvest time.

=== Production ===
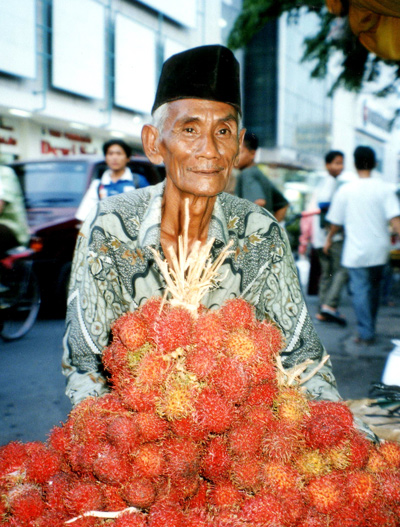
Javanese rambutan seller in Semarang, Indonesia

As of 2014, Thailand was the largest producer of rambutans (Thai: เงาะ, RTGS: ngo), growing 450,000 tonnes, followed by Indonesia at 100,000 tonnes, and Malaysia, 60,000 tonnes. In Thailand, the major cultivation centers are Chanthaburi Province, followed by Chumphon Province and Surat Thani Province. In Indonesia, rambutan is produced mainly in Java, Sumatra, and Kalimantan.

Up to 2017, imports of rambutan to the European Union were about 1,000 tonnes annually, enabling a year-round supply from tropical suppliers.

In India, rambutan is imported from Thailand, as well as grown in Pathanamthitta District of the southern state of Kerala.

Low humidity levels, storage time, and mechanical damage can severely affect the quality of the fruit. The fruit has a short shelf life in ambient conditions. Treatments such as irradiation and the use of hot-forced air can help in fruit preservation; the former has seen more success.

=== Distribution ===
The center of rambutan genetic diversity is Indonesia. The tree has been widely cultivated in Southeast Asia including in Malaysia, Thailand, Myanmar, Sri Lanka, Indonesia, Singapore, and the Philippines. It has spread from there to parts of Asia, Africa, Oceania, and Central America.

== In culture ==
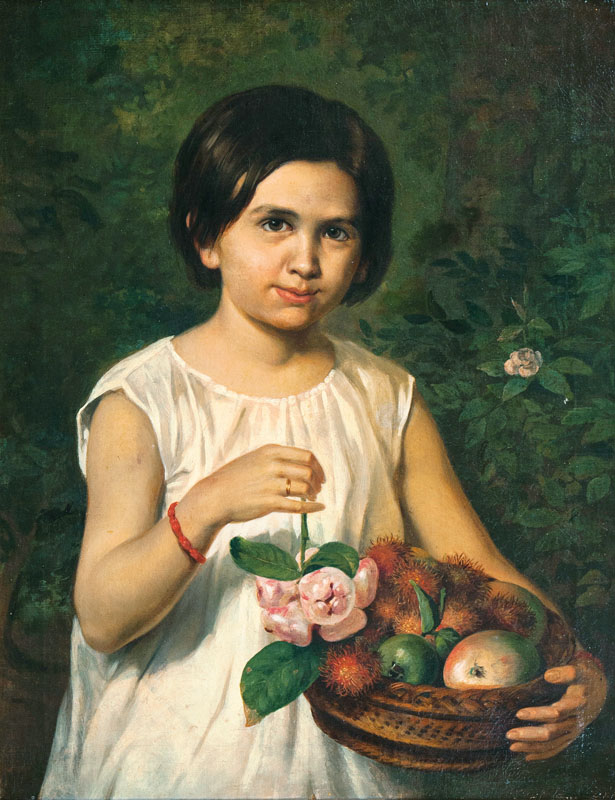
Portrait of an Indonesian girl holding a basket with fruits, Jan Daniël Beynon, 1855

In the Philippines, a legend tells how a man saves a deer from a tiger. The deer turns into a fairy, Rodona, who offers him one wish, and tells him the tiger was the witch Matesa. He chooses a child: it is a girl named Rabona. The witch curses the girl with long thick hair that weighs her down. Eventually, exhausted by the hair, she burns down her parents' house. In the morning, the parents see a rambutan tree with sweet hairy fruits growing near the burnt-out hut; Rabona is nowhere to be found.

== See also ==
- List of culinary fruits
- Pomology
- Pulasan
