= Sarcotesta =

Fleshy seedcoat

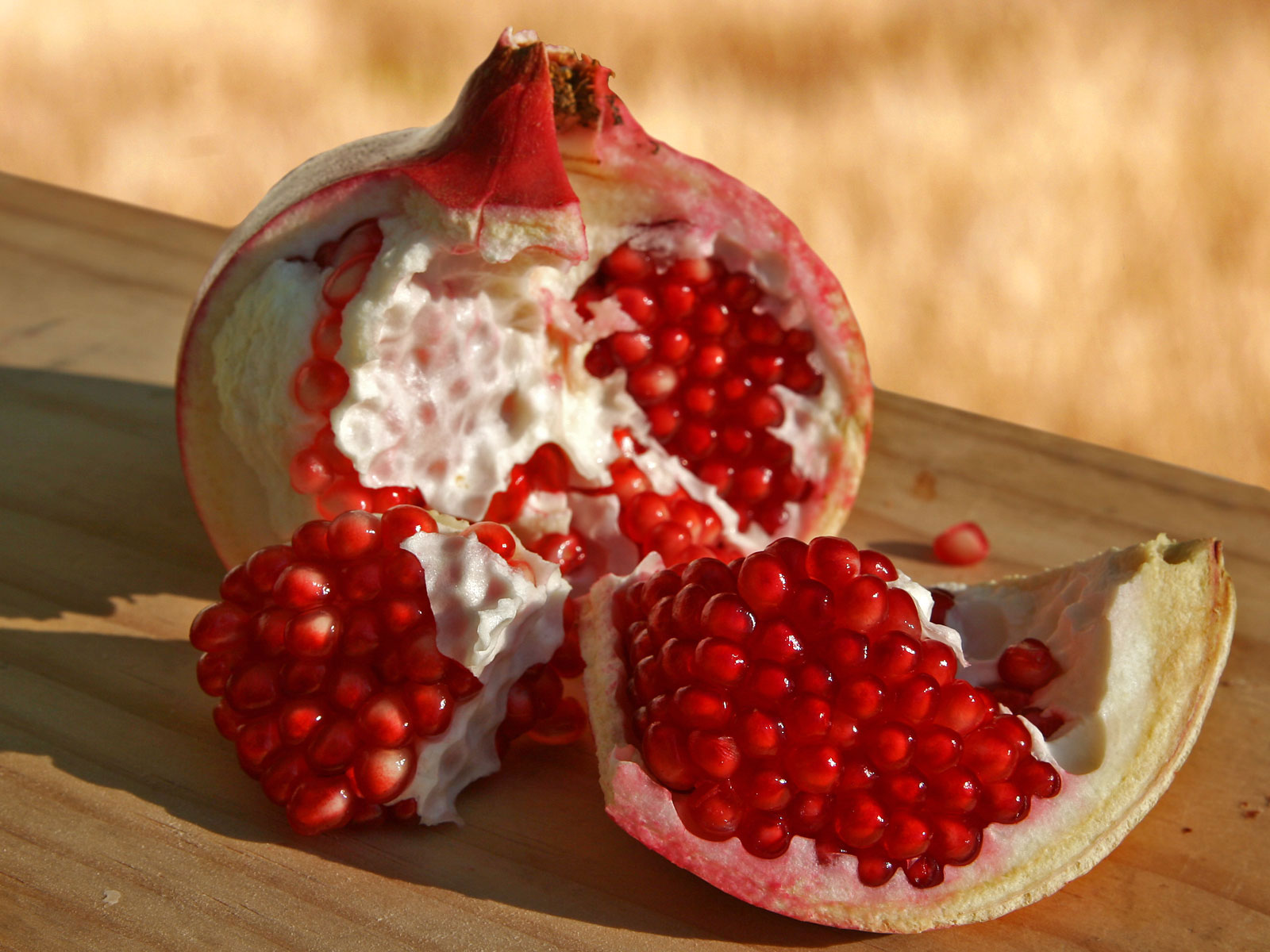
Pomegranate seeds have a red sarcotesta.

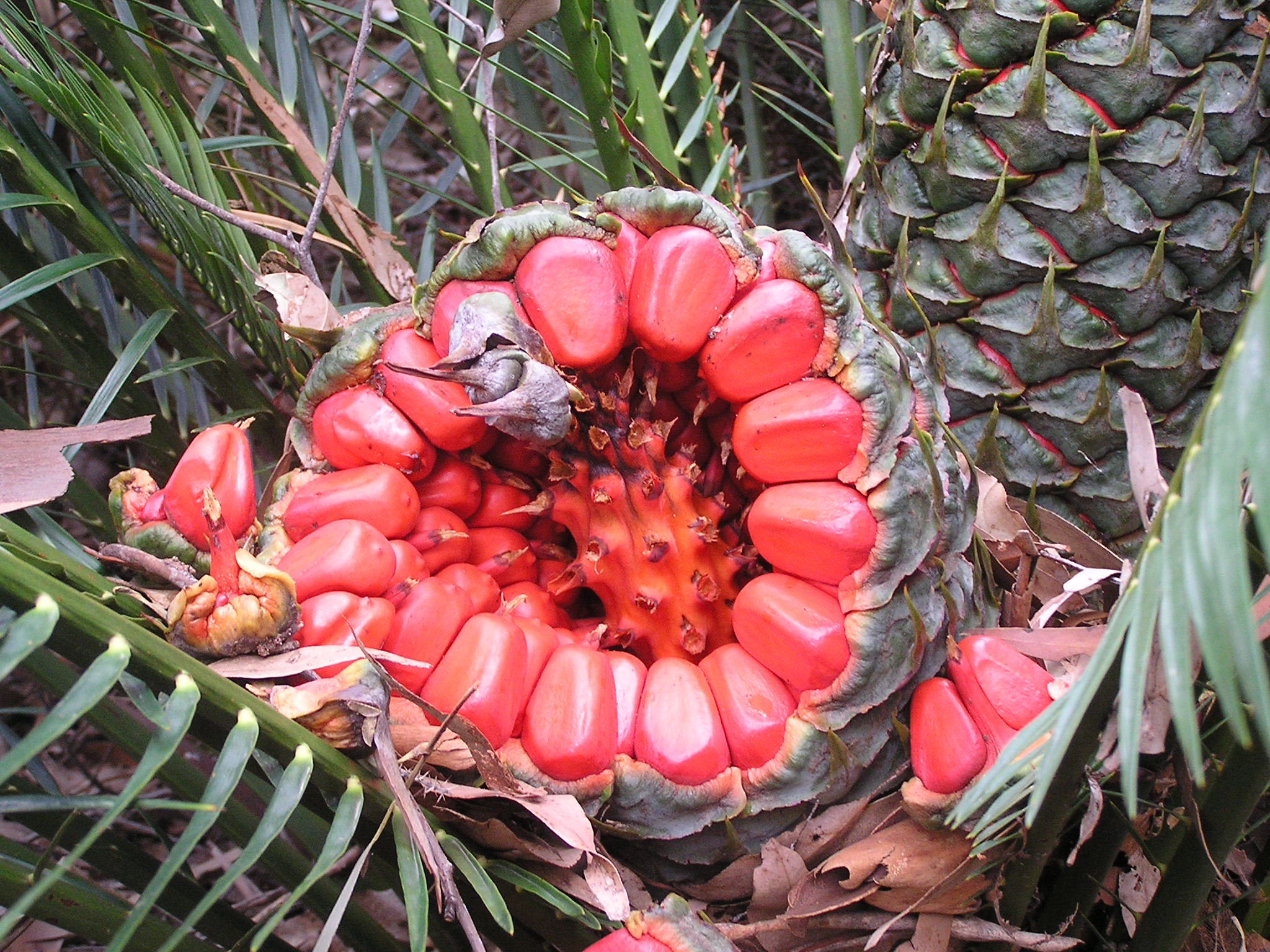
Some cycads, such as this Macrozamia communis, produce seeds with a sarcotesta.

The sarcotesta is a fleshy seedcoat, a type of testa. Examples of seeds with a sarcotesta are pomegranate, ginkgo and some cycad seeds. The sarcotesta of pomegranate seeds consists of epidermal cells derived from the integument, and there are no arils on these seeds.
