= Apple (disambiguation) =

An apple is an edible fruit.

Apple, Apples or APPLE may also refer to:

- Apple Inc., an American multinational technology company
- Apple (name), a list of people and fictional characters named Apple
- Apples in mythology, the fruit as a mythic or religious symbol

== Arts, entertainment and media ==
=== Film and television ===
- "The Apple" (Star Trek: The Original Series), a 1967 sci-fi TV episode
- The Apple (1980 film), a sci-fi musical comedy
- The Apple (1998 film) (Persian: Sib), an Iranian true-life drama
- "Apple", an episode of The Good Doctor
- Apples (film) (Greek: Μήλα), a 2020 Greek drama

=== Music groups ===
- Apple (band), a British psychedelic rock group
- The Apples in Stereo, originally The Apples, an American rock group
- The Apples (Scottish band), an early 1990s, indie-dance group
- The Apples (Israeli band), a 2000s funk, jazz and groove group

=== Musical works ===
- Apple (A. G. Cook album), 2020
- Apple (Mother Love Bone album), 1990
- Apples (album), by Ian Dury, 1989
- "Apple" (song), by Charli XCX from Brat, 2024
- "Apple", a song by GFriend from Song of the Sirens, 2020
- "Apple", a song by Julia Michaels from Inner Monologue Part 1, 2019
- "Apples", a song by Lily Allen No Shame, 2018

=== Publications ===
- Apple Daily, a Hong-Kong–based tabloid
- Apple Daily (Taiwan), a tabloid
- Apples (novel), by Richard Milward, 2007

=== Other media ===
- Apple (artwork), by Yoko Ono, 1966
- Apple FM, an Australian community radio station
- Apples (card game), a Whist-like trick-taking game

== Businesses and organisations ==
- Apple Bank, an American bank
- Apple Corps, a British multimedia company founded by the Beatles
  - Apple Records, a record label
- Apple Leisure Group, an American travel and hospitality conglomerate
- Apple Pugetsound Program Library Exchange (A.P.P.L.E.), an Apple computer users' group
- Apple Comics, or Apple Press, an American comic book publisher, 1986–1994
- Yabloko (Russian: Я́блоко, lit. 'apple'), The Russian United Democratic Party
- Party of Free Democrats (formerly and informally Yabluko, lit. 'apple'), Ukraine
- Apple Store, a chain of retail stores from Apple Inc.

== Events ==
- Apple Cup, an American college football rivalry
- Apple Fire, a 2020 wildfire in Riverside County, California

== Places ==
- Apples, Vaud, Switzerland
- Apple, Oklahoma, United States
- Apple Creek (disambiguation)
- Apple Island (disambiguation)
- Apple River (disambiguation)

== Technology ==
- Apple (1910s automobile), an American car by Apple Automobile Company 1917–1918
- Apple car project, a planned car by Apple Inc.
- Apple (programming language), a PL/I dialect developed by General Motors
- Ariane Passenger Payload Experiment (APPLE), a 1981 Indian communication satellite
- HP Apple, a microprocessor

=== Computers ===
- Apple I, 1976 computer by Apple Inc.
- Apple II (original), 1977 computer
- Apple II, entire line of Apple Inc. computers
- Apple III, 1980 computer

== See also ==
- Apel (disambiguation)
- Appel (disambiguation)
- Adam's apple (disambiguation)
- Apple Store (disambiguation)
- Apple TV (disambiguation)
- Big Apple (disambiguation)
- Crabapple (disambiguation)
- Thornapple (disambiguation)
- Zapple (disambiguation)
- Candy Apples (born 1976), American pornographic actress
- Cashew apple, the fruit that grows with the cashew nut
- Custard apple, several fruits
- Hedge apple, Maclura pomifera
- Love apple, two species
- Mammee apple, two species
- May apple, Podophyllum peltatum
- Oak apple, a gall that grows on oak trees
- Rose apple, several species
- Wax apple, Syzygium samarangense
