= Apple Store (disambiguation) =

Apple Store can refer to several retail operations of Apple Inc.:

- Apple Store or Apple Retail Store, a chain of physical stores that mainly sells Apple hardware products or provide support services
  - Apple Online Store, an online version of the Apple Retail Store at Apple.com
- App Store (iOS/iPadOS), an online store for iOS, iPadOS, tvOS, watchOS, and iMessage applications
- Mac App Store, an online store for macOS applications

== Other ==
- iTunes Store, an online media store that sells music, movies, and TV shows
  - Apple Books Store, an online bookstore that sells eBooks and audiobooks

== See also ==
- Apple Specialist
  - Computerware
  - Haddock Corporation
  - Nabih's Inc.
  - Small Dog Electronics
  - Tekserve
- App store
