= Haddock Corporation =

American company

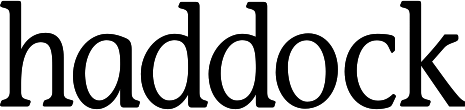
- Type: Private
- Industry: Consulting; Retail (defunct)
- Predecessor: Wichita Software
- Founded: 1978; 48 years ago in Wichita, Kansas, United States
- Founder: Richard Haddock
- Number of locations: 4 stores (1977–2014)
- Area served: Wichita, Kansas; Salina, Kansas; Oklahoma City, Oklahoma; Des Moines, Iowa
- Services: Apple sales and service
- Website: http://www.gohaddock.com

Haddock Corporation is an American consumer electronics and information technology consulting business based in Wichita, Kansas, which operated four Haddock Computer Center retail locations in Kansas, Oklahoma, and Iowa. Founded as a software company, Haddock has been an Apple-authorized dealer and computer repair shop since 1984, the year the Macintosh computer was released. Company founder and CEO Richard Haddock served on Apple's reseller advisory board for over ten years. He is a member and one of the founders of the Apple Specialist Marketing Corporation.

== History ==
Richard Haddock founded the Haddock Corporation in 1977 as a way to establish the first of his Haddock Computer Center stores in Wichita, Kansas, the same year. A computer programmer by trade, Haddock was also active in software development. In 1978, he developed the application "Petroleum Accountant" for the Wichita oil company Parrish Corporation. The software operated on the IBM 5110, IBM 5120, and IBM System/23 Datamaster, and was widely distributed.

In 1979, Haddock's store began the stocking Apple II, establishing a long-lived relationship with Apple Computer that lasted until Haddock's Computer Center operations went defunct. In January 1984, Apple reached out to Haddock to convince him to sell the new Macintosh computer on its release. While the store had sold IBM PC compatibles occasionally in the years following, Haddock's stock of Apple products represented the bulk of their profit and earned the store a local reputation. In 1987, a second Haddock Computer Center location opened up in Salina, Kansas.

During Gil Amelio's tenure as Apple CEO, Haddock and other retailers worked with Apple's Paddy Wong and Loretta Flores to develop the Apple Specialist program intended to strengthen Apple's retail channel.

At its peak in 2005, Haddock had three Computer Center locations across three states: Wichita, Kansas, Oklahoma City, Oklahoma, and Des Moines, Iowa. The company's Oklahoma City store was opened up at the behest of Apple in 2002; in 2004, it generated US$1 million in sales. A Des Moines, Iowa, location followed in 2005. However, within the next three years a second independent Apple Specialist retailer opened up in Oklahoma City, and in 2005, Apple themselves raised an Apple Store there. Faced with too much competition, leading to a steep drop in projected sales for 2006 of just $250,000, Haddock was forced to shutter the Oklahoma location in May 2006.

After his stepson David Pearson died of glioblastoma multiforme, an aggressive cancer of the brain, at the age of 16, Haddock consolidated his Computer Center and LivingSound businesses into the parent Haddock Corporation and closed all locations. In his son's wake, he formed the Dragon Master Foundation, a nonprofit organization for the development of specific genome databases for cancer researchers.

== See also ==
- ComputerWare, a defunct retailer in the San Francisco Bay Area that sold Macintosh computers and peripherals exclusively
- Tekserve, another defunct Macintosh-only store in New York City
