= Dream it. Code it. Win it. =

American non-profit organization

- Company type: 501(c)(3)
- Founded: 2013
- Headquarters: New York, NY
- Key people: Cristina Dolan, MIT Media Lab Alum
- Website: Dream it. Code it. Win it.

Dream it. Code it. Win it. is a 501(c)(3) non-profit organization launched by Cristina Dolan, the MIT Club of New York, the MIT Enterprise Forum of New York City, and TradingScreen to celebrate and reward computer science education amongst high school students, college students, and young women. Dream it. Code it. Win it. held its inaugural "create-a-thon" at the Cooper Union Great Hall in New York City on the evening of April 30, 2014, and awarded students more than $70,000. The awards ceremony was preceded by a panel discussion, which included: Joi Ito from the MIT Media Lab, Mike Perlis the CEO of Forbes, Jeanne Sullivan the co-founder of StarVest Partners, Philippe Buhannic the CEO of TradingScreen, Erik Nordlander an Engineering Partner at Google Ventures, Teresa A. Dahlberg the Dean at Cooper Union, and Alex Diaz the Head of Product Development at Yahoo!.

The contest was sponsored by Cooper Union, TradingScreen, Silicon Valley Bank, MedAffinity EHR, SorinRand, and Richard Berman Publications. The prize money was sponsored by the MIT alumni community, Tekserve, TradingScreen, and other small organizations.

In 2014, Dream it. Code it. Win it.'s founder, Cristina Dolan, was honored by Traders Magazine with a Charitable Works Award for Dream it. Code it. Win it.

== Create-A-Thon ==
In October 2013, Dream it. Code it. Win it. launched its first coding competition, a "Create-A-Thon," to reward students for developing solutions to interesting problems created with computer science tools, such as code. The Dream it. Code it. Win it. contest was open to students enrolled at an accredited institution at the high school and university level. Participants were to submit a brief video that showcases a tool they coded that solves a problem affecting them or their peers. The objective was to use creativity to solve a problem in a novel way, and the submission page was hosted on the Dream it. Code it. Win it. Facebook page.

According to the Dream it. Code it. Win it. website, submissions were reviewed by a panel of judges, who then decided on the winners. The contest received over 100 submission from schools around the United States, including: Harvard, University of Pennsylvania, New York University, and Princeton. Over 50 percent of the submissions were made by females or teams that had at least one female, which beats the national average of 11% of women in hackathons.

The submission process ran on Facebook until March 30, 2014. At the college level, prizes ranged from $20,000, $15,000, $10,000, and $5,000. At the high school level, the winning team received an iPad for each member and a trophy. Six finalists were chosen at the college level and one winning team was chosen at the high school level.

== 1st Annual Awards Ceremony and Panel Discussion - April 30, 2014 ==
The awards ceremony was held on April 30, 2014, at the Cooper Union Great Hall in New York City from 5:30 PM until 9:30 PM. The tickets to the event were sold through the MIT Enterprise Forum to the general public and through the MIT Club of New York to club members only. Marketing was primarily done on social media platforms such as Facebook, LinkedIn, Twitter, Instagram, Google Plus, and YouTube. The awards ceremony included a panel discussion on the future of innovation in a networked world, where panelists gave advice to an audience full of entrepreneurs, venture capitalists, programmers, and most importantly, students. Videos from the event can be viewed on the Dream it. Code it. Win it. YouTube channel, including the entries from the finalists who won.

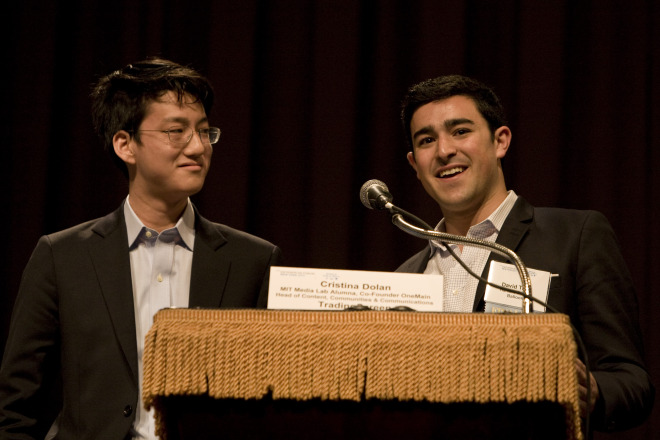
First place winners of Dream it. Code it. Win it.

The awards were the following:

Place	Value	Team	School
First Place	$20,000	Balloon	Harvard
Second Place	$15,000	Mycrophone	Cooper Union
Third Place	$10,000	Kricket	Quinnipiac University
TradingScreen Technology Entrepreneurship Award	$10,000	Oaddo	James Madison University
Tekserve Prize for Women in Technology	$5,000	The Babbling Brook	MIT Media Lab
Prize for Innovation	$5,000	Unbreak	Quinnipiac University
High School: Excellence in Creative computer Science	iPads	Cartwheels	Stuyvesant High School

== 1st Annual Competition News - 2014 ==
The Dream it. Code it. Win it. contest was positively received by the media and thought leaders in the Computer Science and STEM space. Venture Capitalist Fred Wilson wrote a piece about the contest on his blog, which was also featured on Business Insider. The Better (TV series) Show interviewed contest organizer, Cristina Dolan, and Ernie Anastos from Fox 5 News also covered the event as well. Winners were interviewed by their local school newspapers as well.

== 2nd Annual Competition - April 30, 2015 ==
The 2nd Annual "Dream it. Code it. Win it." awards ceremony took place at the Cooper Union Great Hall in New York, NY on April 30, 2015. The ‘Unleashing Opportunities with Technology’ event and awards ceremony featured visionaries that discussed how computer science education can be used as a tool to create many opportunities across various industries. The event celebrated the brightest students who received awards throughout the evening, and students won close to $70,000 in cash and prizes throughout the celebration.

Mitchel Resnick, the Professor of Learning Research at the MIT Media Lab and Chair of the Code-to-Learn Foundation kicked off the event with a fireside chat with the moderator, Jason Pontin, Editor in Chief of the MIT Technology Review and Chairman of the MIT Enterprise Forum. The ‘Women and Diversity in Computer Science’ panel consisted of successful women with STEM backgrounds. Jan Cuny, NSF Director for Computing Education and Program Officer for Broadening Participation in Computing Program, Bonnie E. John, the Director of Computation and Innovation at The Cooper Union and Georgia Garinois-Melenikiotou, EVP, Corporate Marketing, The Estée Lauder Companies offered advice for engaging more female students. Mrs. Garinois-Melenikiotou awarded the $10,000 Women's College Prize to Team Codapillar from Pace University.

The ‘Disruptive Innovation Creates Opportunities’ panelists represented three of the largest sectors that rely on technology: Finance, Media and Technology. CEO and co-founder of TradingScreen, Philippe Buhannic, the Engineering Partner of Google Ventures, Erik Nordlander and Founder and CEO of AppNexus, Brian O’Kelley. Philippe Buhannic awarded the TradingScreen $10,000 Technology Entrepreneurship Award.
