= Apple Island =

Apple Island may refer to several places:

- Apple Island (Massachusetts), a former island now incorporated into Logan International Airport complex in Boston, Massachusetts, USA
- Apple Island (Michigan), a small island in Orchard Lake in Oakland County, Michigan, USA
- Apple Island (Missouri), an island in the Mississippi River
- Æbelø, a Danish island
- Tasmania, a state of Australia that is often referred to as "Apple Island" or the "Apple Isle"
- Hanikatsi laid, an islet in Estonia
