= John Boston =

John Boston may refer to:

- John Boston (brewer)
- John Boston (politician)
- John Boston (MP), see Bedford (UK Parliament constituency)
