= Apple River =

Apple River may refer to:

== Canada ==
- Apple River, Nova Scotia, a community
  - Apple River Airport, a grass landing strip

== United States ==
- Apple River (Illinois), a Mississippi tributary
- Apple River (Wisconsin), a St. Croix River tributary
- Apple River, Illinois, a village
- Apple River, Wisconsin, a town
- Apple River Fort, Elizabeth, Illinois
- Apple River Township, Jo Daviess County, Illinois

== See also ==
- Apple Creek (Mississippi River)
- Apple (disambiguation)
- Apple Creek (disambiguation)
