= Dawn Baillie =

American movie poster designer

- Born: 1964 (age 61–62)
- Occupations: Graphic designer, film poster artist
- Website: bltomato.com

Dawn Baillie (born 1964) is an American film poster designer. Her first poster was for Dirty Dancing in 1987. She is the winner of the 2012 Saul Bass Award and her work is on display at Poster House in Manhattan until September 8, 2024.

== Career ==
Dawn Baillie was born in Hollywood. She graduated with a BFA in Communication Design and Illustration from Otis College of Art and Design 1986. She entered the advertising industry as assistant art director at Seiniger Advertising. There, she made the poster for Dirty Dancing in 1987. After working at Dazu, she co-founded the agency BLT in 1992 with Rick Lynch and her husband Clive Baillie. The agency continues to make film posters, and its roster includes 2020s films such as Barbie.

Baillie has made posters for The Silence of the Lambs, Zoolander, Indiana Jones and the Last Crusade and The Truman Show. Her most recent poster was for The Tragedy of Macbeth in 2021. She told The New York Times that she cannot choose a favorite poster: "As a mother, I love all of my children. Each poster has its own story of love, challenges, tears, and triumphs. I love the first one, for “Dirty Dancing,” because it gave me confidence, and I love the last because it proves I’m still capable."

Her work was on display at Poster House in Manhattan from March 14 until September 8, 2024.
