= Ralph DeLuca =

American art advisor and collector

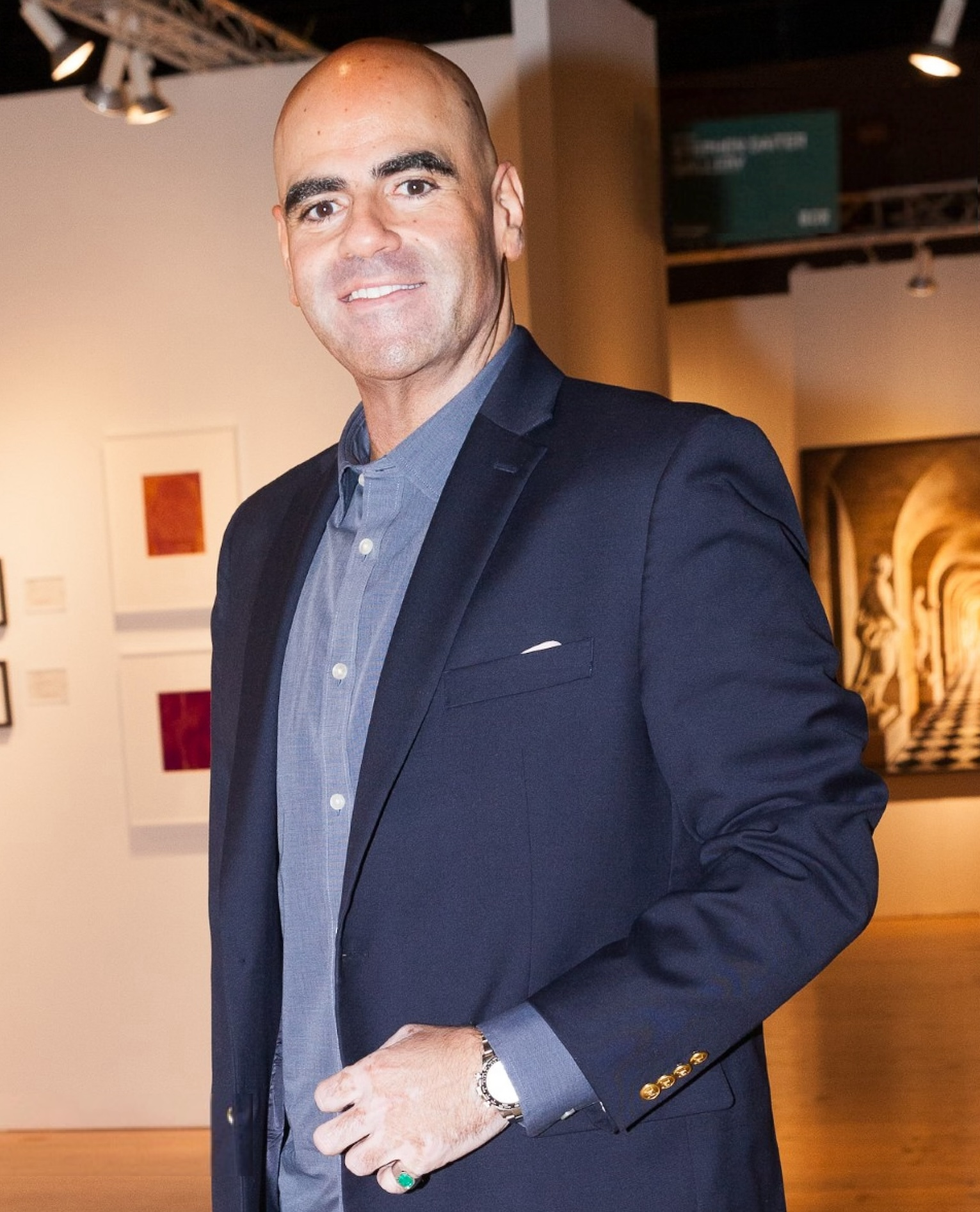
- Ralph DeLuca at the Park Avenue Armory
- Born: May 13, 1976; East Hanover, New Jersey
- Occupations: Art advisor and collector
- Website: Official website

Ralph DeLuca (born May 13, 1976) is an American art advisor, and collector specializing in contemporary art and film memorabilia. DeLuca is an advisor to several celebrity clientele.

== Biography ==
DeLuca was born in East Hanover, New Jersey. He purchased his first print, from Salvador Dalí's The Divine Comedy suite, using his birthday money at age 13. He first worked in finance on Wall Street and collected memorabilia. Following Tony Shafrazi's advice, he changed paths and became an art collector and advisor. He has been collecting contemporary artwork since at least the early 2000s.

DeLuca's clients include Leonardo DiCaprio, Sylvester Stallone, Quentin Tarantino, and co-founder of Tinder, Sean Rad.

Since purchasing a home in Las Vegas in 2017, DeLuca has become an active figure in the city's emerging art community. He serves as an art adviser to MGM Resorts International and curated the Icons of Contemporary Art exhibition at the Bellagio Gallery of Fine Art.

DeLuca purchased and restored a former residence of Betty Grable and is a member of the advisory council at the Mob Museum. He also located the original contract signed by Bugsy Siegel to purchase the Flamingo Las Vegas and helped fund its acquisition for the Mob Museum's permanent collection.

In November 2024, DeLuca began authoring a column called "Street Smarts" in Cultured magazine, offering advice about the contemporary art market.

Since March 2025, DeLuca has served as Vice Chairman of the Popular Culture department at Sotheby's. In June 2025, the new department auctioned off the sweater vest from Ferris Bueller's Day Off.

== Collection ==
DeLuca has collected over 5,000 vintage posters, including for Dracula (1931), acquired in 2009 for $310,700 from actor Nicolas Cage, and Phantom of the Opera (1925), acquired in 2014 for $203,150. In 2012, DeLuca purchased one of the few remaining original posters for Metropolis (1927) at auction.

DeLuca has loaned posters from his collection for exhibitions at MGM Resorts, Salon 94, Poster House, and the interdepartmental graphic design initiative of the Los Angeles County Museum of Art.

His art collection is estimated to consist of 1,000-plus paintings, including figures such as Andy Warhol and George Condo, and over 20,000 photographs. He also collects vintage Las Vegas casino chips, specifically those dating from what he refers to as the "mob era", spanning the 1930s through 1989.
