= Tropical fruit =

Fruits that typically grow in warm tropical climates

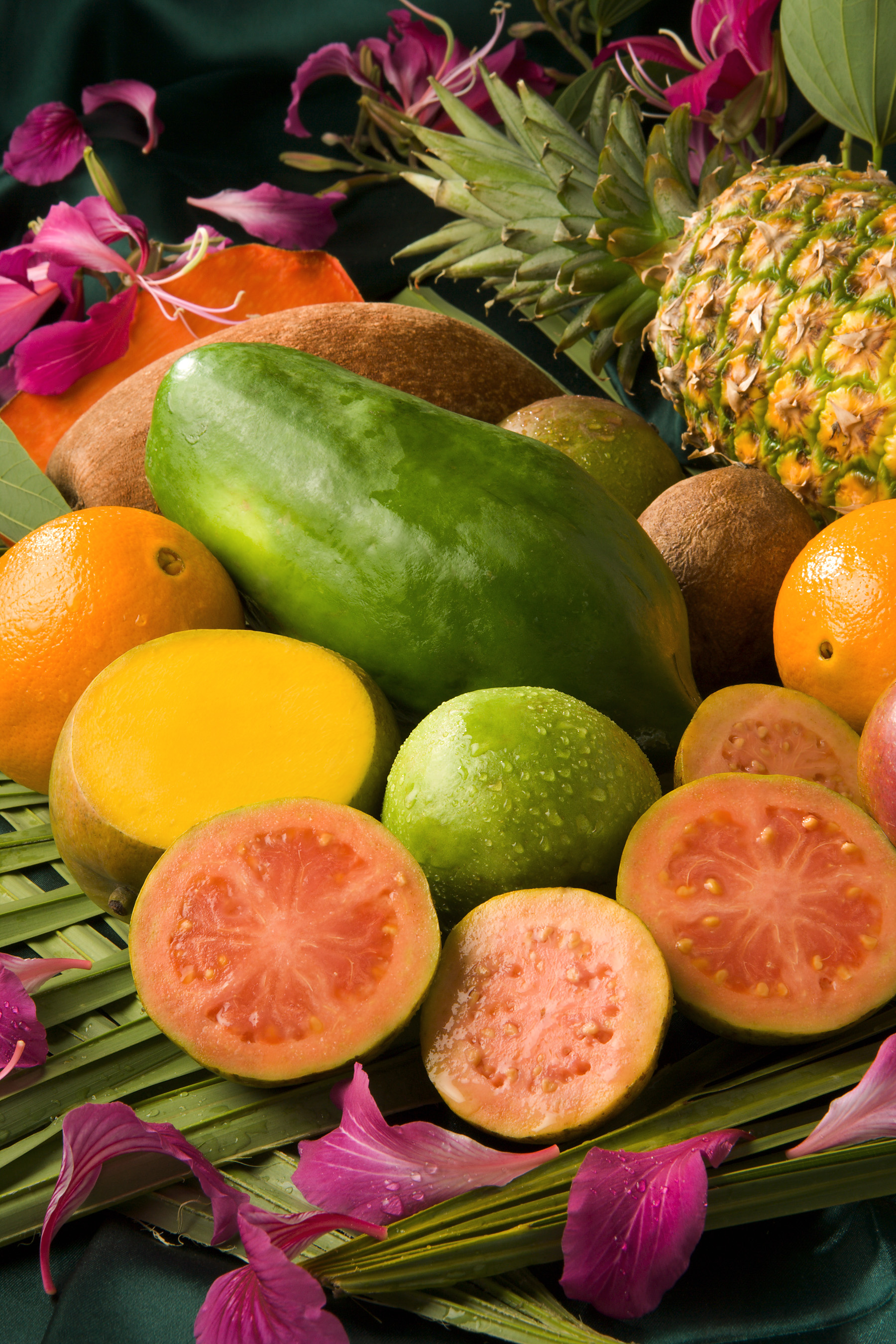
Tropical fruit, including mamey sapote, mango, orange, papaya, pineapple, and sapodilla

There are many fruits that typically grow in warm tropical climates or equatorial areas.

== Tropical fruits ==
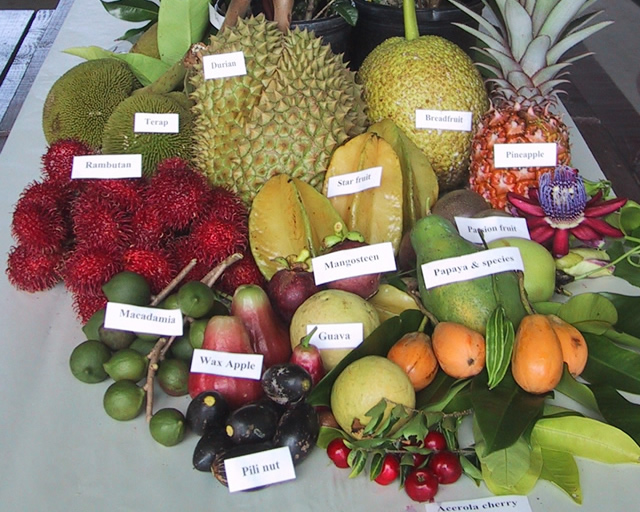
A group of tropical fruit

Varieties of tropical fruit include:

- Abiu
- Açaí
- Acerola (West Indian cherry; Barbados cherry)
- Achachairú (Bolivian mangosteen; achacha)
- Ackee
- Atemoya
- Avocado (alligator pear)
- Banana
- Bengal currant (Christ's thorn; Carandas plum; Karonda; Karanda; Kanna)
- Biribá (lemon meringue pie fruit)
- Black sapote (chocolate pudding fruit)
- Brazil nut
- Breadfruit
- Cacao pod
- Caimito (star apple)
- Canistel (eggfruit)
- Carambola (star fruit; five fingers)
- Cashew apple
- Chempedak
- Cherimoya

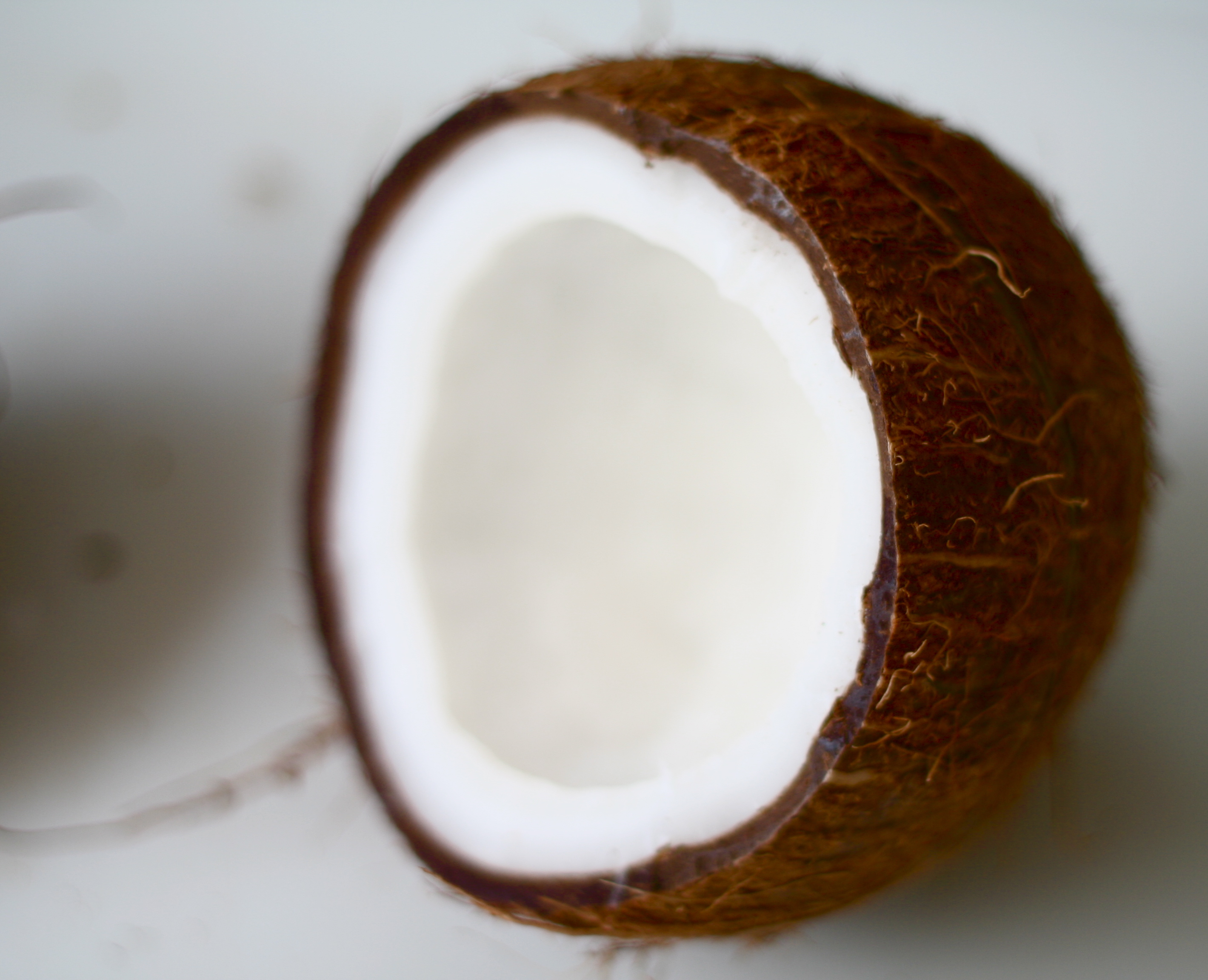
A split coconut

- Coconut
- Coffee cherry
- Cupuaçu
- Custard apple
- Dragon fruit (pitaya)
- Durian
- Genipap
- Governor's plum
- Granadilla (maracujá-açu in Portuguese)
- Guaraná
- Guava
- Hog plum (taperebá in Portuguese)
- Ice-cream bean (inga-cipó in Portuguese)
- Indian gooseberry
- Jabuticaba
- Jackfruit
- June plum (golden apple;cajamanga or cajarana in Portuguese)
- Jamun
- Indian jujube (Indian plum; Chinese date; Chinee apple; ber; dunks)
- Langsat (longkong)
- Longan (dragon's eye)
- Lúcuma
- Lychee
- Macadamia
- Malay apple (rose apple; pommerac in French)
- Manila tamarind (Madras thorn; monkeypod tree; camachile)
- Mamey apple
- Mamey sapote (abricó in Portuguese)
- Mango
- Mangosteen
- Marang
- Miracle fruit
- Mousami (musami; mosambi; sweet lime; sweet lemon; sweet limetta)
- Natal plum
- Papaya
- Passion fruit
- Peanut butter fruit
- Pewa (peach nut; pupunha in Portuguese)
- Pili nut
- Pineapple
- Plantain
- Pomelo
- Pulasan
- Quenepa (Spanish lime; mamoncillo)
- Rambutan
- Safou (butterfruit)
- Salak (snake fruit)
- Sapodilla (chicle; naseberry)
- Silver date palm (Indian date; sugar date palm; wild date palm)
- Soursop (graviola in Portuguese)
- Strawberry guava (Cattley guava)
- Sugar apple (sweetsop; ata in Portuguese)
- Suriname cherry (pitanga)
- Tamarind
- Wax apple (bell apple)
- White sapote

== See also ==
- List of culinary fruits
