= Ethel Reed =

American graphic artist (1874–1912)

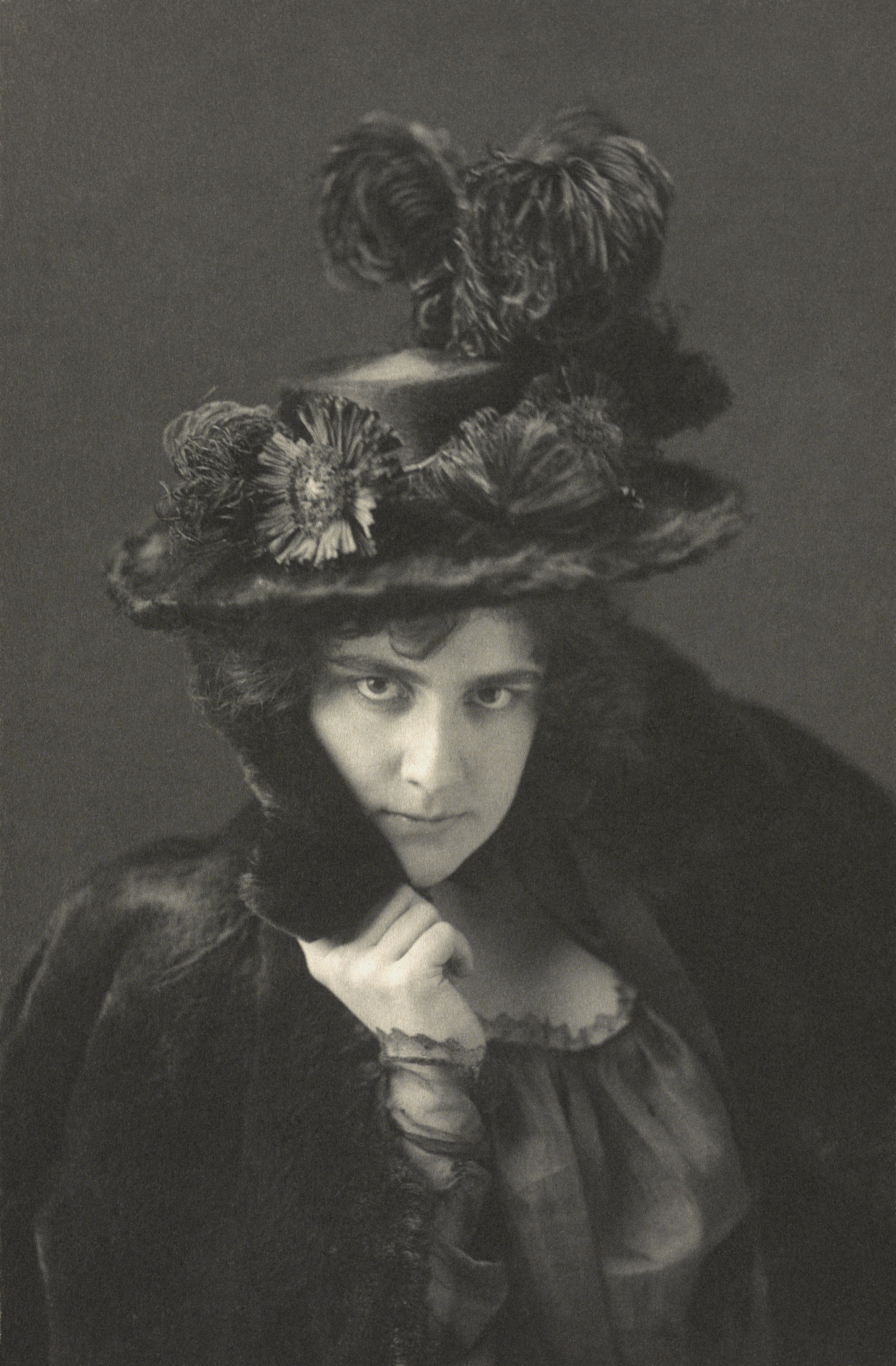
- A photograph of Ethel Reed by Frances Benjamin Johnston (ca. 1895)
- Born: March 13, 1874; Newburyport, Massachusetts
- Died: March 1, 1912 (aged 37); London, United Kingdom
- Style: Graphic arts

Ethel Reed (March 13, 1874 – March 1, 1912) was an American graphic artist. In the 1890s, her works received critical acclaim in America and Europe. In 2016, they were on exhibit in the Metropolitan Museum of Art and Museum of Modern Art in New York, the National Museum of American History in Washington, D.C., the Fine Arts Museums of San Francisco, the Frederick R. Weisman Art Museum of the University of Minnesota in Minneapolis, and the Nelson-Atkins Museum of Art in Kansas City.

== Early life and career ==
Reed was born in Newburyport, Massachusetts on March 13, 1874. She was the daughter of a local photographer Edgar Eugene Reed and Mary Elizabeth Mahoney, an immigrant from County Cork, Ireland. Her father died of tuberculosis in 1892, and Reed and her mother consequently suffered hardship. After they moved to Boston in 1890, she studied briefly at the Cowles Art School in 1893, and after 1894 began to receive public notice for her illustrations. Reed's youthful beauty and cleverness caught the attention of a Newburyport artist Laura Hills, who became a mentor. During her time in Boston, she achieved national fame as a poster artist while still in her early 20s. She did many series of posters and book illustrations during a span of less than two years. In the mid-1890s she was engaged to fellow artist Philip Leslie Hale, whose father Edward Everett Hale was a prominent Bostonian. However, the engagement was broken off. In 1896, she traveled Europe with her mother. In 1897, they settled in London where Reed worked as an illustrator, in particular for The Yellow Book, a quarterly literary periodical which was co-founded by Aubrey Beardsley. She had two children with different lovers.

Reed was acquainted with important literary and artistic figures of her day, including the writer Richard le Gallienne, the architects Bertram Goodhue and Ralph Adams Cram, and the photographer Fred Holland Day. She was the model for Day's photographs Chloe and The Gainsborough Hat. She also modeled at least three times for portraits by Frances Benjamin Johnston.

In her short career, Reed achieved recognition as one of the preeminent illustrator artists of her time.

== Later life and death ==
Reed was unable to find work after moving to Europe; she turned to drugs and alcohol after years of disappointment. Her circumstances in England are difficult to trace, and certain records of her final years have yet to surface. However, according to research, she died in her sleep in 1912. Her biographer has asserted that alcoholism and the use of sleeping medications contributed to her death.

== Recognition after death ==
In March 2022, Poster House opened Ethel Reed: I Am My Own Person, a show featuring poster and magazine cover illustrations Reed designed in the late 19th and early 20th centuries.

== Works illustrated ==
- Boston Sunday Herald (1895)
- Boston Illustrated (1895)
- Lily Lewis Rood, Pierre Puvis de Chavannes: A Sketch (Boston: L. Prang & Co., 1895)
- Albert Morris Bagby, Miss Träumerei: A Weimar Idyl (Boston: Lamson, Wolffe & Co., 1895)
- Gertrude Smith, The Arabella and Araminta Stories (Boston: Copeland & Day, 1895)
- Julia Ward Howe, Is Polite Society Polite? (Boston: Lamson, Wolffe & Co., 1895)
- Charles Knowles Bolton, The Love Story of Ursula Wolcott (Boston: Lamson, Wolffe, & Co., 1896)
- Mabel Fuller Blodgett, Fairy Tales (Boston: Lamson, Wolffe, & Co., 1896)
- Louise Chandler Moulton, In Childhood's Country (Boston: Copeland & Day, 1896)
- Time and the Hour, (1896)
- Richard Le Gallienne, The Quest of the Golden Girl: A Romance (London: John Lane, 1897)
- The Yellow Book, Volumes XII (January 1897) and XIII (April 1897)
- Agnes Lee, The Round Rabbit and Other Child Verse (Boston: Copeland & Day, 1898).
- The Sketch, Volume 21 (April 6, 1898)
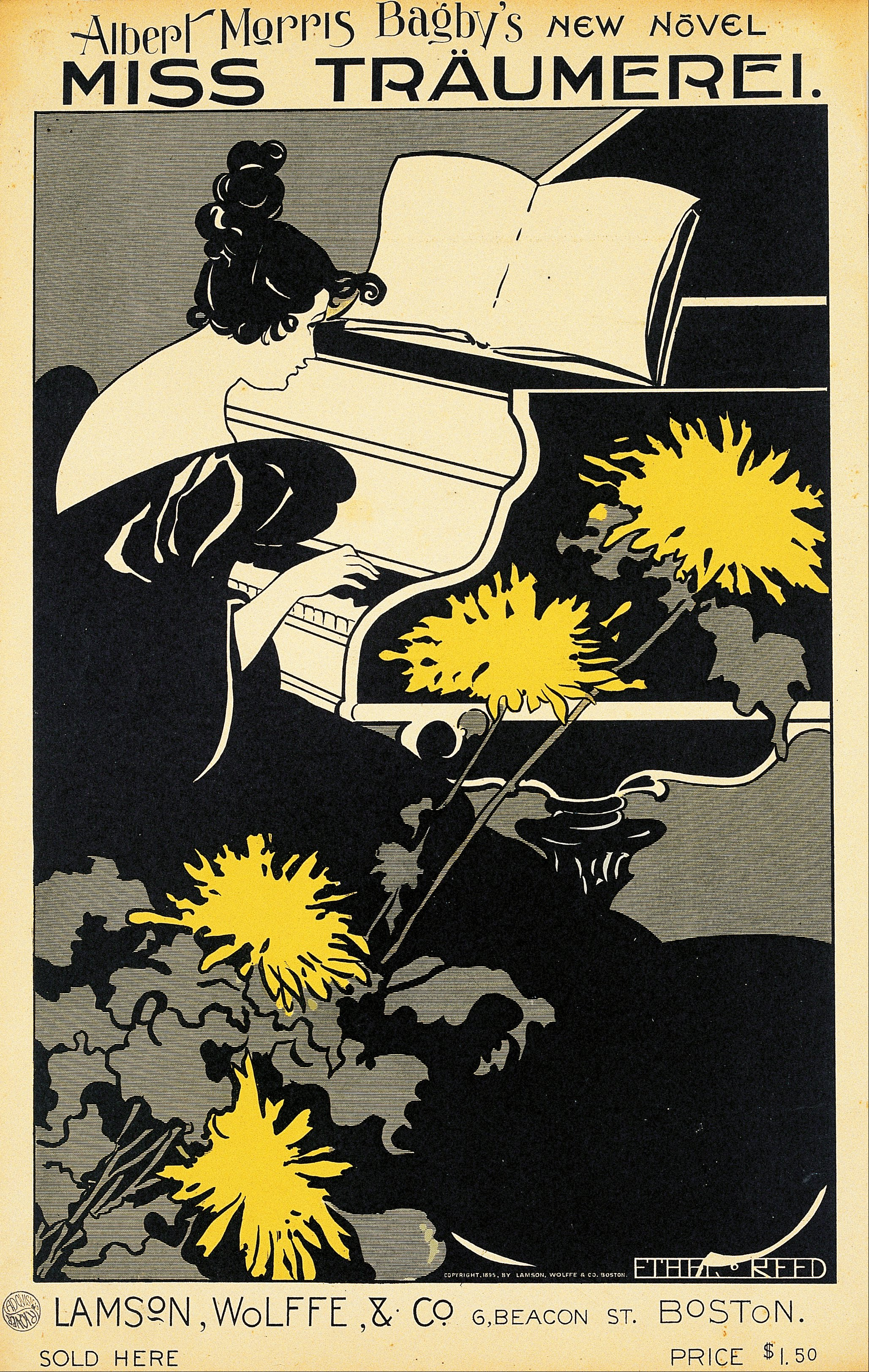
Book cover by Ethel Reed

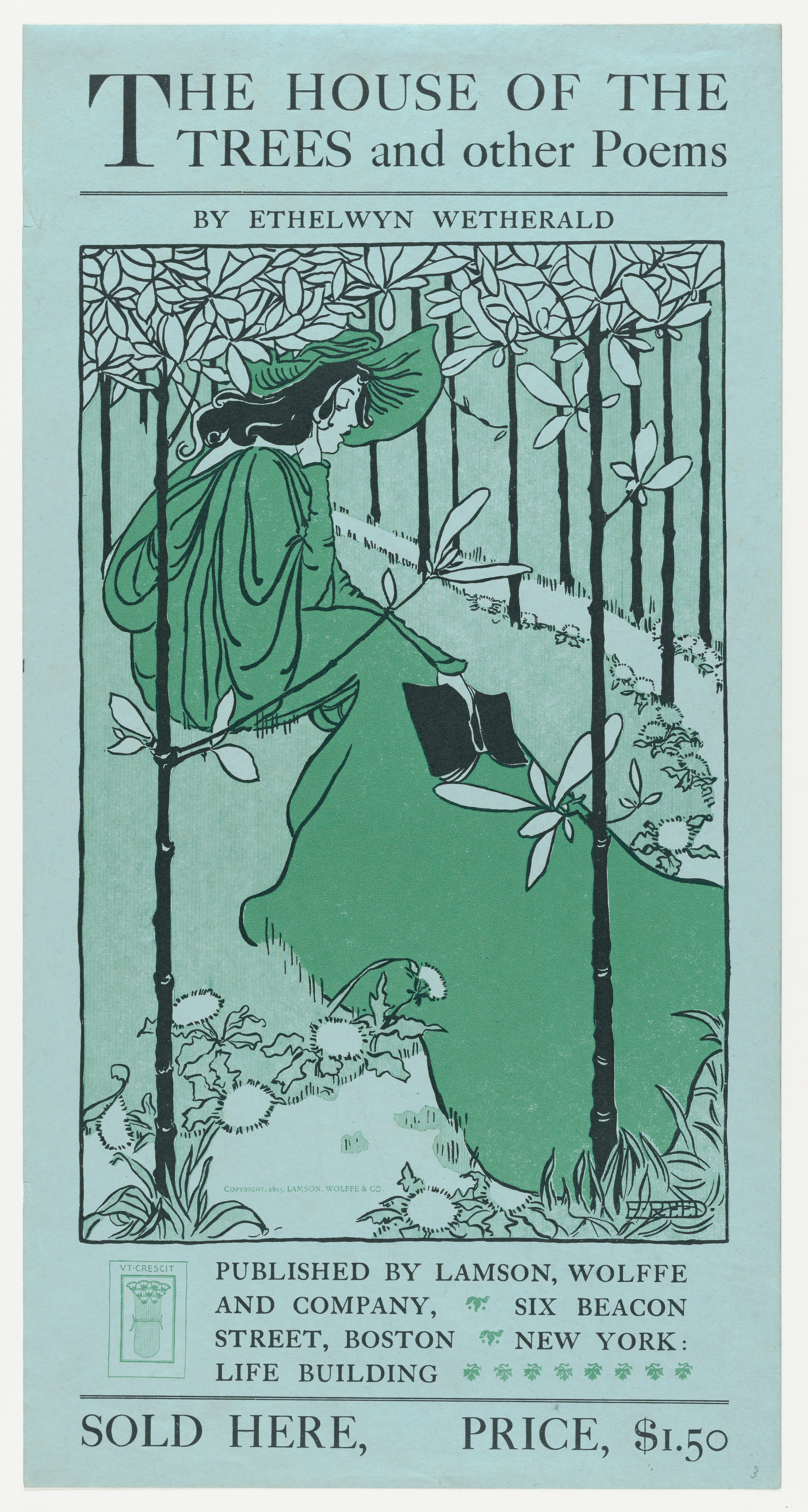
Book cover for The House of the Trees and Other Poems

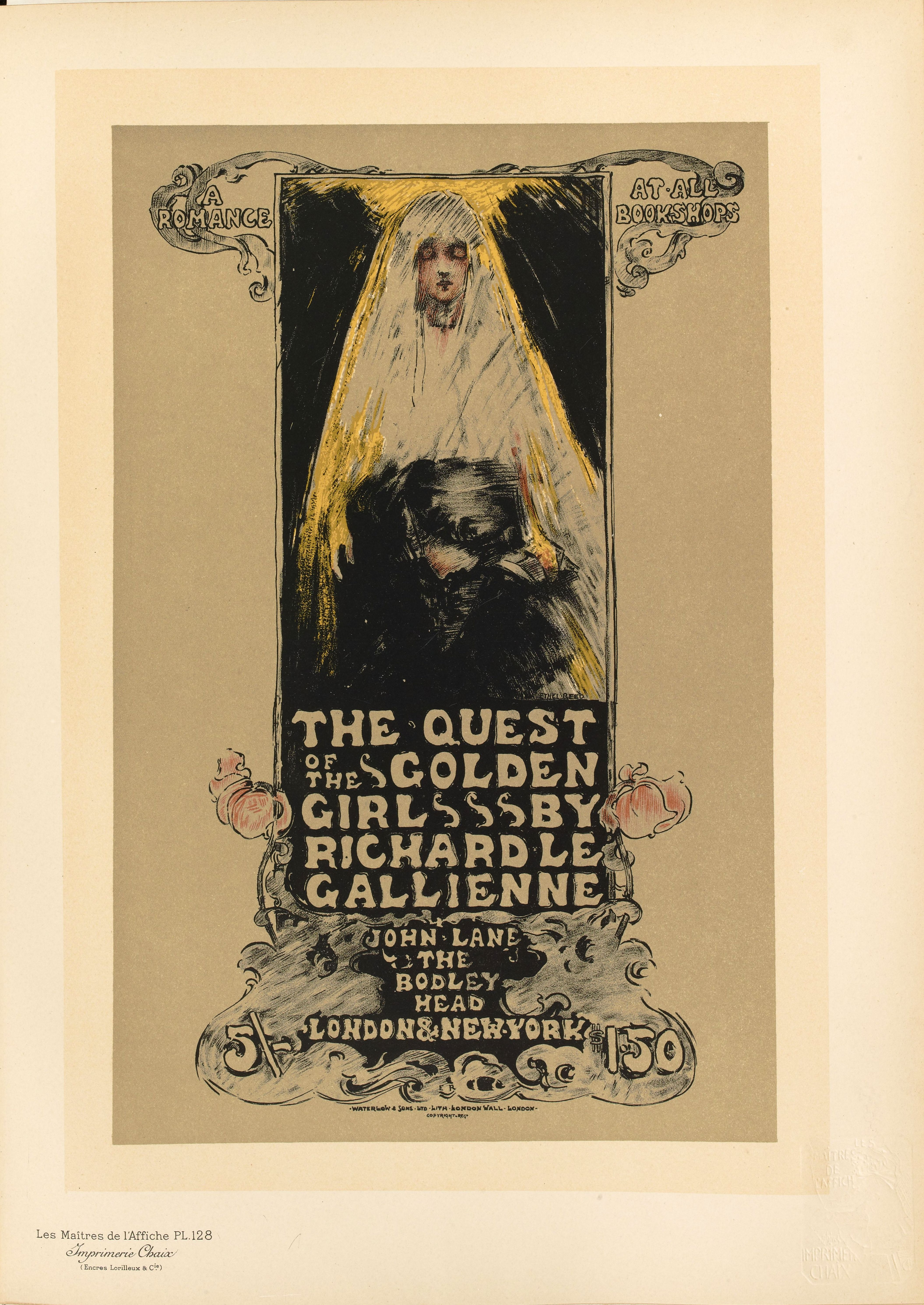
Poster for The Quest of the Golden Girl, published in Les Maîtres de l'Affiche
