= Mabel Fuller Blodgett =

American novelist

- Portrait of Mabel Fuller Blodgett by William McGregor Paxton
- Born: April 8, 1869; Bangor, Maine, United States
- Died: June 7, 1959 (aged 90); Cambridge, Massachusetts, United States
- Occupations: children's author, novelist

Mabel Fuller Blodgett (April 8, 1869–June 7, 1959) was an American novelist and children's author. Her works include the lost-race novel At the Queen's Mercy (1897) and several collections and novels for children.

== Early life and education ==
Blodgett was born Mabel Louise Fuller on April 8, 1869, in Bangor, Maine, to Ransom Burritt Fuller and Louisa White Fuller. In 1873, the family moved to Boston, Massachusetts, where her father established the Boston Insurance Company and later the Old Colony Insurance Company, both specializing in marine insurance. She was educated at the Convent Sacre Coeur in Providence, Rhode Island.

== Career ==
Blodgett published her first novel, The Aspen Shade: A Romance, in 1889. That same year she published her first children's book, In Poppy Land, which was a collection of seven fairy stories.

Her next novel, At the Queen’s Mercy, was published in 1897. A "lost race" story similar to H. Rider Haggard's She: A History of Adventure (1887), it features a mysterious walled city where a white queen named Lah reigns over black subjects. Scholar Richard A. Lupoff regards Blodgett's novel as a possible source for Edgar Rice Burroughs' character of La of Opar, who first appeared in The Return of Tarzan (1913).

Blodgett published several more children's books between 1903 and 1917. In 1919, Blodgett published The Life and Letters of Richard Ashley Blodgett, First Lieutenant United States Air Service, about her son Richard, who had been killed in action during World War I.

== Personal life ==
Blodgett married her husband Edward Everett Blodgett in Boston, Massachusetts, on November 17, 1891. They had four children. She died on June 7, 1959 in Cambridge, Massachusetts. She is buried in Mount Auburn Cemetery in Cambridge.

== Selected works ==
- The Aspen Shade: A Romance (1889)
- In Poppy Land (1889)
- Fairy Tales (Illustrated by Ethel Reed) (1895)
- At the Queen's Mercy (1897)
- The Giant's Ruby and Other Fairy Tales (1903)
- When Christmas Came Too Early (1911)
- The Strange Story of Mr. Dog and Mr. Bear (1915)
- Peasblossom: The Adventures of the Pine Tree Fairy and Others (1917)
- The Magic Slippers (1917)
