= Small Dog Electronics =

- Company type: Private
- Industry: Retail; Consulting
- Founded: Waitsfield, Vermont, 1994
- Founder: Don Mayer
- Headquarters: Burlington, Vermont
- Services: Apple sales and service
- Website: http://www.smalldog.com/

Small Dog Electronics is an American consumer electronics and information technology consulting business and electronics store based in Burlington, Vermont. Founded by Don Mayer in 1994, the business has grown from a small computer repair and reselling business into an Apple Premier Partner and manufacturer of iPod accessories like speakers and headphones. Most of the firm's employees bring their pet dogs to work each day.

In November 2019, Small Dog Electronics closed its original Waitsfield location, moving to a new location in Burlington, Vermont.

In 2010, Small Dog Electronics won the Deane C. Davis Outstanding Business of the Year award from the Vermont Chamber of Commerce.

in 2011, Don Mayer (founder) won the Vermont Businesses for Social Responsibility lifetime achievement award.

Small Dog Electronics collected 30 tons of e-waste during September 24, 2011 recycling event.
