= Apple TV =

Apple TV may refer to:

- Apple TV (device), a set-top box for TVs
- Apple TV (streaming service), formerly known as Apple TV+
- Apple TV app, a media player and video-on-demand service

== See also ==
- tvOS, the operating system that powers the Apple TV device (formerly known as Apple TV Software)
- Apple Studios, a film and television studio
- iTunes Store, an online store for multimedia content
- Macintosh TV, a personal computer with integrated television capabilities
- Apple Interactive Television Box, a prototype television set-top box
