= Apple Island (Missouri) =

Island in Missouri, U.S.

Coordinates: 38°51′38.2″N 90°34′16.4″W

Apple Island is an island in the Mississippi River. The island is entirely within St. Charles County, Missouri, United States.

The island most likely was named for the fact apples were shipped there.
