= John Boston (brewer) =

Australian migrant and brewer

- Born: unknown England
- Died: 30 September 1804; Nuku'alofa, Tongatapu, Tonga
- Occupations: Surgeon, apothecary, salt farmer, brewer, trader
- Known for: Early Australian brewer
- Spouse: 1 wife (name unknown)
- Children: 3 children (names unknown)

John Boston was an early Australian migrant who was known for plying his hand at a number of different trades including salt farming and brewing. Boston opened a brewery in 1796 making a form of corn beer.

== Early life ==
=== Australia bound ===
As a young man Boston hovered on the outskirts of the Birmingham circle of radicals and, like Joseph Priestley, became a staunch republican. Perhaps because of his political opinions he decided to leave 'reactionary England' in 1793, and in December recommended himself to the Colonial Office as a trained surgeon and apothecary, versed in the arts of brewing and with 'theoretical and some practical knowledge of agriculture'. The secretary of state agreed to his going, hoped he would prove useful, and urged Governor John Hunter to keep him. He sailed with his wife and three children in the Surprize which left Spithead (1794 May 2) going via Rio de Janeiro to Sydney (1794 Oct 25). Having been sent out by government to supply the colony with salted fish, Boston had at some time offered to procure and salt fish for the settlement; but he required boats and men, and more assistance than it was possible to supply. He proposed to try his trade at Broken Bay.

=== In Sydney town ===
In August 1795 due to the insufficient supplies of salted provisions, salt became scarce. Amongst other useful knowledge Boston professed to possess, he offered his skills at making salt from seawater. As it was much wanted, his offers were accepted and an eligible spot at Bennelong's Point (as the east point of the cove had long been named) had been chosen. He began his operations, for which he had seven convicts assigned to him, whose labour, however, only produced three or four bushels of salt in more than as many weeks.

=== Brewing ===
In 1796, with the aid of an encyclopedia, Boston produced the first fermented alcohol beverage made at Sydney, which sold for 1s 6d (1 shilling, 6 pence). The corn beer, being made by Boston, was brewed from properly malted maize and bittered with the leaves and stalks of the love apple, (Lycopersicum, a species of Solanum), or as it was more commonly called in the settlement, the Cape gooseberry. Boston found this succeeded so well, that he erected at some expense a building for the business and was engaged in brewing and making soap.

== See also ==
- List of breweries in Australia
