= Apples (card game) =

- A trick-taking game for 4 players
- Type: trick-taking
- Players: 4
- Skills: Card counting, Tactics, Teamwork
- Age range: 12+
- Cards: 52-card
- Deck: French
- Rank (high→low): A K Q J 10 9 8 7 6 5 4 3 2
- Play: Clockwise
- Playing time: ~10 minutes per hand
- Chance: Low — Moderate

Apples is a 4-player trick-based game similar in play to hearts, spades, and bridge. A standard 52-card deck is used. The object of the game is to accumulate 250 points before the other players by collecting pairs, triples, and four-of-a-kinds in tricks.

== Rules ==
=== Dealing ===
Dealings starts to the left of the dealer and continues in a clockwise direction until all cards have been dealt. Each player receives 13 cards.

=== Bidding ===
Bidding starts with the player on the left of the dealer for the first round. On subsequent rounds, bidding moves in a clockwise direction. The goal of bidding is to determine the trump suit for that round.

- Players must name a number followed by a suit. For example, "Two Diamonds"
- The next player may pass or may announce a stronger bid. Diamonds is the weakest suit, followed by Hearts, then Clubs, and Spades is the strongest. For example, if the previous bid was "Two Diamonds," the next player may announce "Two Spades" which would be a stronger bid. Higher numbers are automatically stronger bids no matter what suit. For example, "Three Diamonds" is a stronger bid than "Two Spades." Players may not bid a higher number than the number of cards they have in their hand of that suit.
- Any player may pass if they do not wish to bid. If all the players pass, the cards are redealt.

The suit of the bid that wins becomes the trump suit for that round. The winner of the bid must place cards of the trump suit into the "bidding pile" equal to the number of cards he bid. If the winning bid for example was "Three Diamonds" then the winner of the bid must place three diamonds into the pile. Other players place the same number of cards of their choice into the bidding pile. The bidding pile is then shuffled and redealt to the players.

=== Selection of Target Card ===
After bidding and redealing of the bidding pile, each player chooses one card from their hand to set aside facedown. This card will become the target card for the player.

=== Winning of Tricks ===
The player who won the bid starts the play by playing one card. Players in clockwise fashion then play a card of their choice; they must follow suit, if they can, otherwise they may play any card.

The player who played the highest valued card wins the trick. If one or more trump card was played, the highest value trump card wins the trick; otherwise the highest value card of the leading suit wins the trick. The player who won the trick takes the cards in the trick into his "winnings pile," which will be used later to determine the player's score for that round.

The player who won the trick then plays a card to start the next trick. Play continues for 12-rounds, when the players run out of cards. Players have only twelve cards in their hand, because of the target card selected before play began.

=== Scoring ===
The point values of the cards are as follows:

- 2,3,4,5 = -15 points (negative fifteen points)
- 6,7,8,9 = 5 points (five points)
- 10, Jack, Queen, King = 10 points (ten points)
- Ace = 15 points (fifteen points)

After play has ended, players look at the cards in their winnings pile. Players take out any pairs, triples, or four-of-a-kinds they have won for scoring, discard any singles, and include their target card (selected at the beginning of the round). Scoring is done by adding up the point values of the pairs, triples, or four-of-a-kinds cards. Having a pair of one card earns the point value of that card, having a triple earns twice that point value, and having a four-of-a-kind earns four times the point value. For example, if the player has in their winnings pile two 3s, a 4, a 6, two 9s, a 10 (the target card), three Jacks, a Queen, and two Aces the player has a score of 25 (-15 for the 3s, 5 for the 9s, 20 for the triple Jacks, 15 for the Aces, and nothing for the 4, 6, 10, or Queen).

An exception to these rules of scoring involves the Target Card selected before each round. Having a triple of the target card gives the player 40 points regardless of the original point value of the card. Having four of the target card gives the player 80 points regardless of the original point value of the card. If the player only has a pair of the target card, then scoring is done normally for that card. For example, if the player has in their winnings pile three 4s and two 10s, and their target card was a 4, then the player scores 50 points (40 points for the triple 4s and 10 for 10s).

Players may have negative scores.

=== Winning the Game ===
Rounds are played until a player reaches a total score of 250 points. For longer games, players may continue until they reach 500 points.

== Basic Apples Strategy ==
- Players want to bid for a suit that they have many cards of. Bidding too high is dangerous because the player may lose the cards of their trump suit into the bidding pile. Also players do not get to swap cards into the bidding pile which is useful for clearing suits.
- Clearing suits is beneficial because it allows the player to trump the suit or play a card of a different suit if they do not wish to win the trick.
- Players should try to keep a low card in their hand of every suit to prevent winning a trick that contains a lot of cards with negative point values.
- It is generally dangerous to play a high card as the first card of a suit that has yet to be played, because the subsequent players can simply play their low cards.
- The large penalty associated with low value cards makes winning as many tricks as possible a bad strategy. Instead players should target which tricks they win to avoid getting pairs of cards with negative point values.
- When selecting the target card from their hand, players should try to select a card so that they also have a card in their hand with the same value in the trump suit. This way, players can trump a trick and guarantee getting at least one of their target card.
- Players are allowed and encouraged to look at the tricks that they have already taken in order to properly plan which tricks they wish to take.

== History ==
Apples was invented in England during the 41st International Chemistry Olympiad by two members of the American team. The first game was played on July 24, 2009, during a bus ride from London to Cambridge University. The name derives from the fact that players are trying to collect "pairs" of cards. The word "pairs" is a homophone of "pears" which is associated with the word "apples" in a common idiom.

== See also ==
- Trick-taking game
- Whist
- International Chemistry Olympiad
