= TradingScreen =

TradingScreen, Inc.
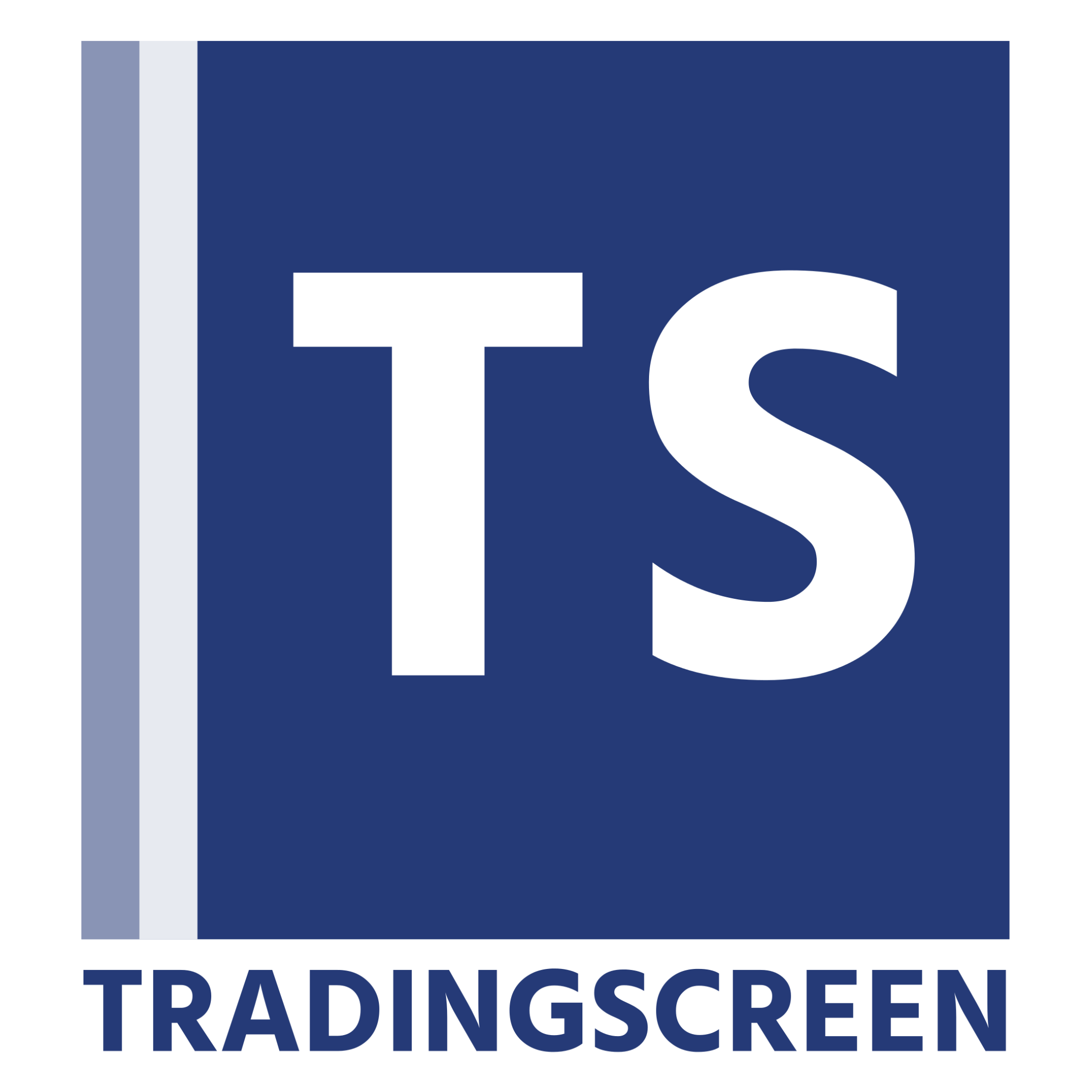
- Company type: Private company
- Industry: Financial Technology Infrastructure and Services
- Founded: 1999
- Defunct: 2021
- Fate: Merged with TS Imagine
- Headquarters: New York City, United States
- Key people: Pierre Schroeder, Chief Executive Officer, Varghese Thomas Chief Operating Officer, Chris Kingsbury Chief Technology Officer
- Revenue: ▲ >$100 Million
- Number of employees: ▲ ~500 Employees
- Website: www.tradingscreen.com

TradingScreen is a US-based financial technology provider of SaaS based trading services for hedge funds, large asset managers, mutual funds, and brokers. TradingScreen's system is broker-neutral, and is designed to handle multiple asset classes and changes in market structure. TradingScreen, Inc. offers electronic trading. The trading platform matches the SaaS based technology from TradeSmart with the ability to connect to Banks, nonbanks, and ECNs.

TradingScreen is headquartered in New York City.

== History ==
TradingScreen was founded in 1999 by Philippe Buhannic and Joseph Ahearn. In 2019, TS launched QUO, a cloud-based ‘software-as-a-service’ platform.

In 2021 Francisco Partners purchased and merged TradingScreen and Imagine Software to create an end-to-end investment management platform called TS Imagine.

== See also ==
- Buy side
- Sell side
- Derivatives
- Algorithmic trading
- Cloud computing
