= Adam's apple (disambiguation) =

An adam's apple, or a laryngeal prominence, is a protrusion in the front of the throat, usually more noticeable in men than in women and children.

Adam's apple may also refer to:

- Forbidden fruit
- Adam's Apple (film), a 1928 British comedy film
- Adam's Apple, a 1986 TV movie directed by James Frawley
- Adam's Apples, a 2005 Danish film
- Adam's Apple (album), a 1966 album by Wayne Shorter
- Adam's Apple (horse), a British Thoroughbred racehorse
- "Adam's Apple", a 1975 song by Aerosmith from the album Toys in the Attic
- Adams Apples, a Ghanaian film series, directed by Shirley Frimpong Manso
- Adam's apple, a variety of lumia
- "Adam's Apple", a 2017 song by KSI
- Adams Pearmain, an apple cultivar
