= Apple (band) =

British rock band

- Origin: Cardiff, Wales
- Genres: Psychedelic rock
- Years active: 1968–1969
- Labels: Page One, Smash
- Past members: Dennis Regan; Robbo Ingram; Jeff Harrad; Charlie Barber; Dave Brassington

Apple were a British psychedelic rock band. The band was founded in Cardiff in 1968 by Rob Ingram on guitar and Jeff Harrad on bass. They released a single LP in 1969, titled An Apple a Day. The album was a commercial failure, and the band ceased to exist shortly after its release. However, during the subsequent years several tracks from the LP, most notably "The Otherside" by Harrad, were dubbed classics of British psychedelic rock by critics, making An Apple a Day one of the most sought-after British psychedelic rarities.

The original vinyl version (released by Page One Records) is now extremely hard to find. A reissue by Repertoire Records was released in 1994, which included several bonus songs (those being early mono versions of some of the album's tracks).

== Members ==
- Dennis Regan, vocals
- Robbo Ingram, guitar
- Jeff Harrad, bass
- Charlie Barber, piano
- Dave Brassington, drums

== Discography ==
=== Albums ===
- An Apple a Day (Page One POLS 016) 1969

=== Singles ===
- "Buffalo Billycan" / "Let's Take a Trip Down The Rhine" (Page One POF 409) 1968
- "Doctor Rock" / "The Otherside" (Page One POF 110) 1968
