= Crabapple (disambiguation) =

Crabapple, a term used for several species of Malus in the family Rosaceae

Crabapple may also refer to:

- Molly Crabapple (born 1983), American artist, author and entrepreneur
- Crabapple, Georgia, one of the oldest parts of Fulton County, Georgia
- Crabapple, Texas, an unincorporated farming and ranching community 10.5 miles north of Fredericksburg
- Crabapple Middle School, a Fulton County school located in Roswell, Georgia

== See also ==
- Edna Krabappel, a fictional character from the animated TV series The Simpsons
- Applecrab, a hybrid of domestic apples with wild crabapples
