= Hanikatsi laid =

Island in Estonia

Coordinates: 58°47′N 23°04′E

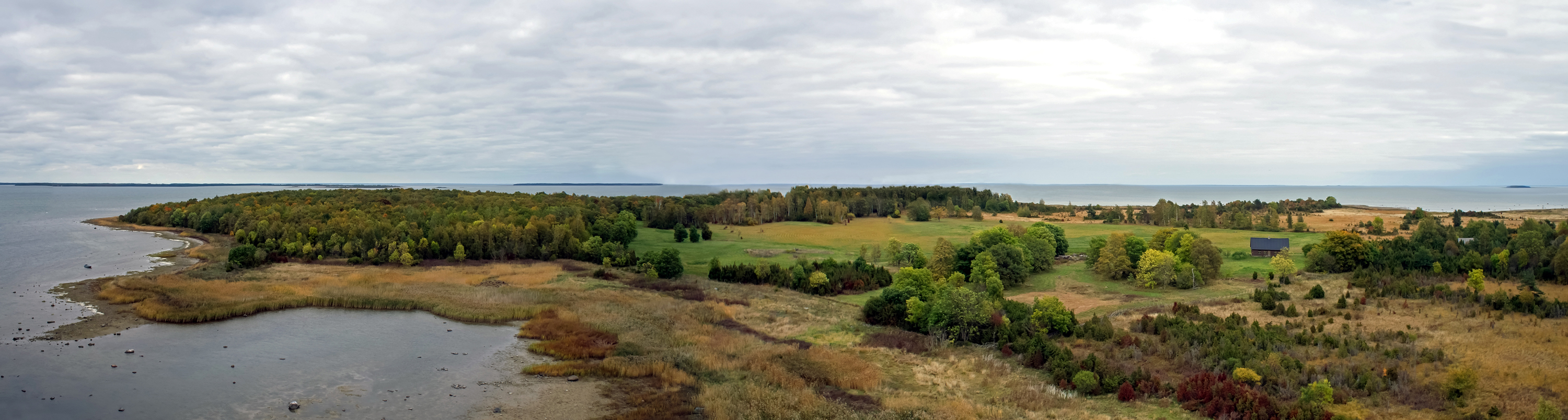
Hanikatsi laid

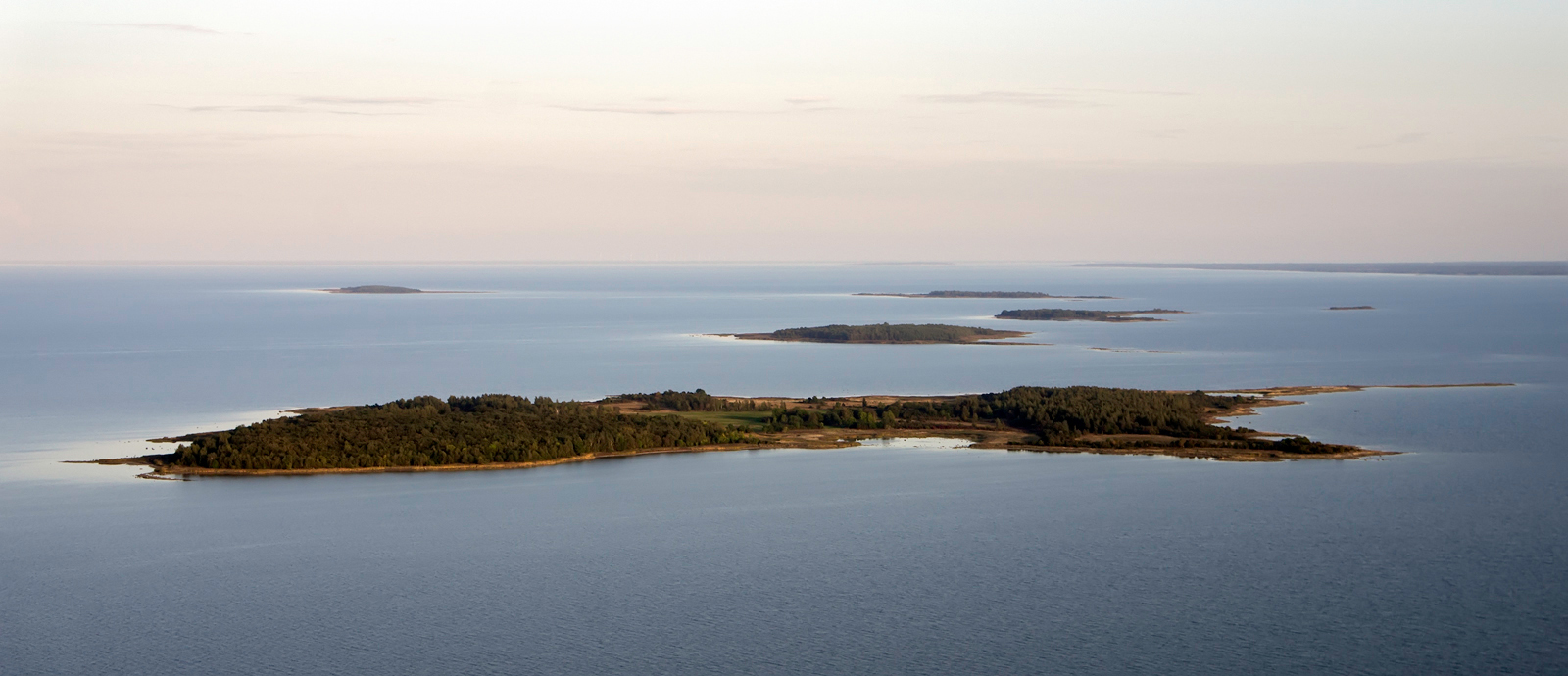
Hanikatsi laid

Hanikatsi laid (Swedish: Äpleö, meaning 'apple island') is an islet in Estonia in the Baltic Sea southeast of Hiiumaa island. It has an area of 83 hectares and no permanent habitation. The islet belongs to Hiiu County, Pühalepa Parish, and is part of Hiiumaa Islets Landscape Reserve, which in turn is part of West Estonian Archipelago Biosphere Reserve.

The flora of Hanikatsi is rich, and over 400 species have been found. There are also records of 117 species of lichens. In the northern part of the islet is the 12-hectare Lepana broad-leaved forest, rich in species. In the southern part there are mostly birch, poplar, and juniper forests.

There are records of habitation of the islet from 1623. The last inhabitant left the islet in 1964. There are still some buildings on the islet that have been renovated by the Landscape Reserve and are now used by researchers.

Many people originating from the islet have the surname Hanikat.

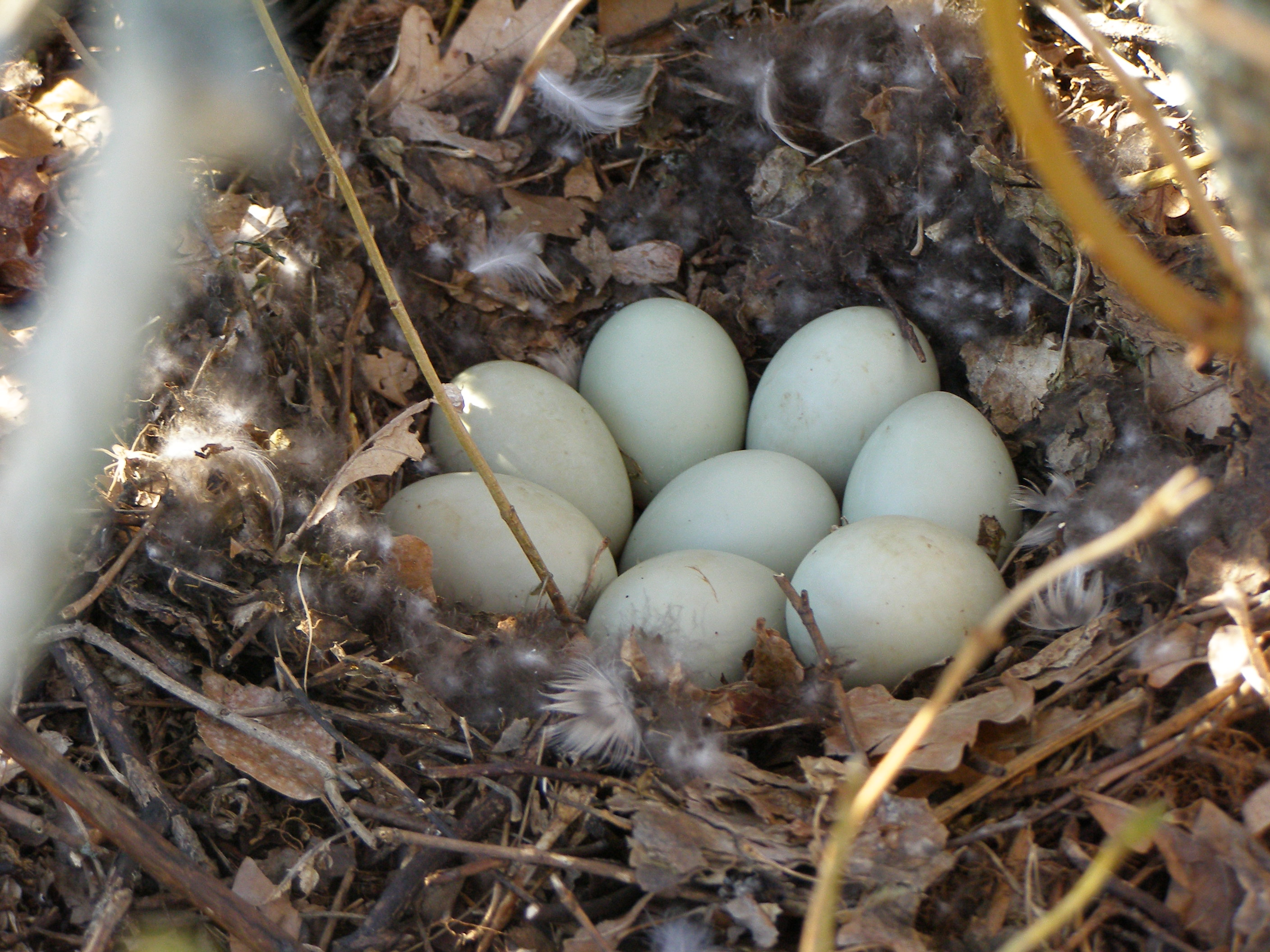

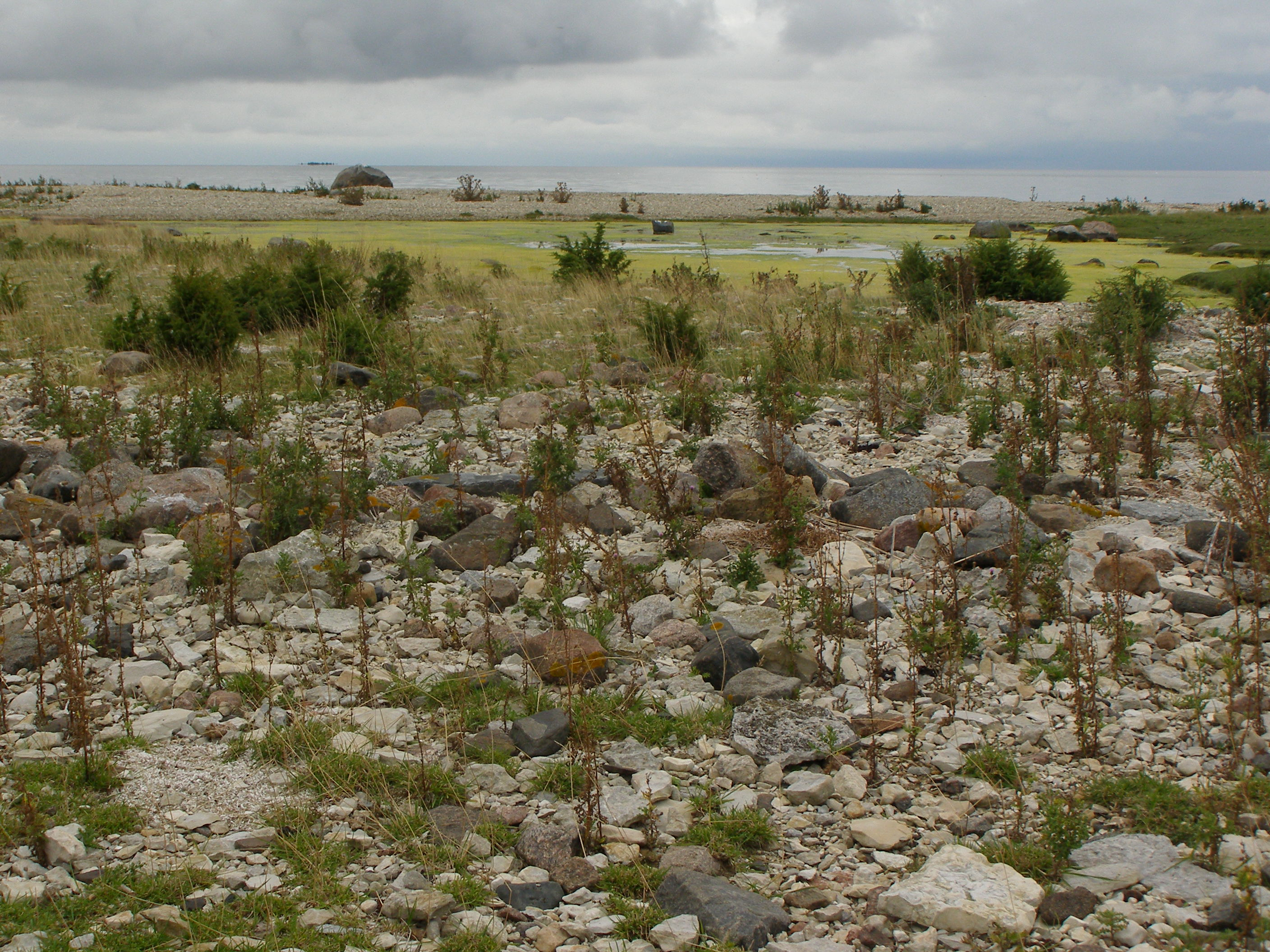

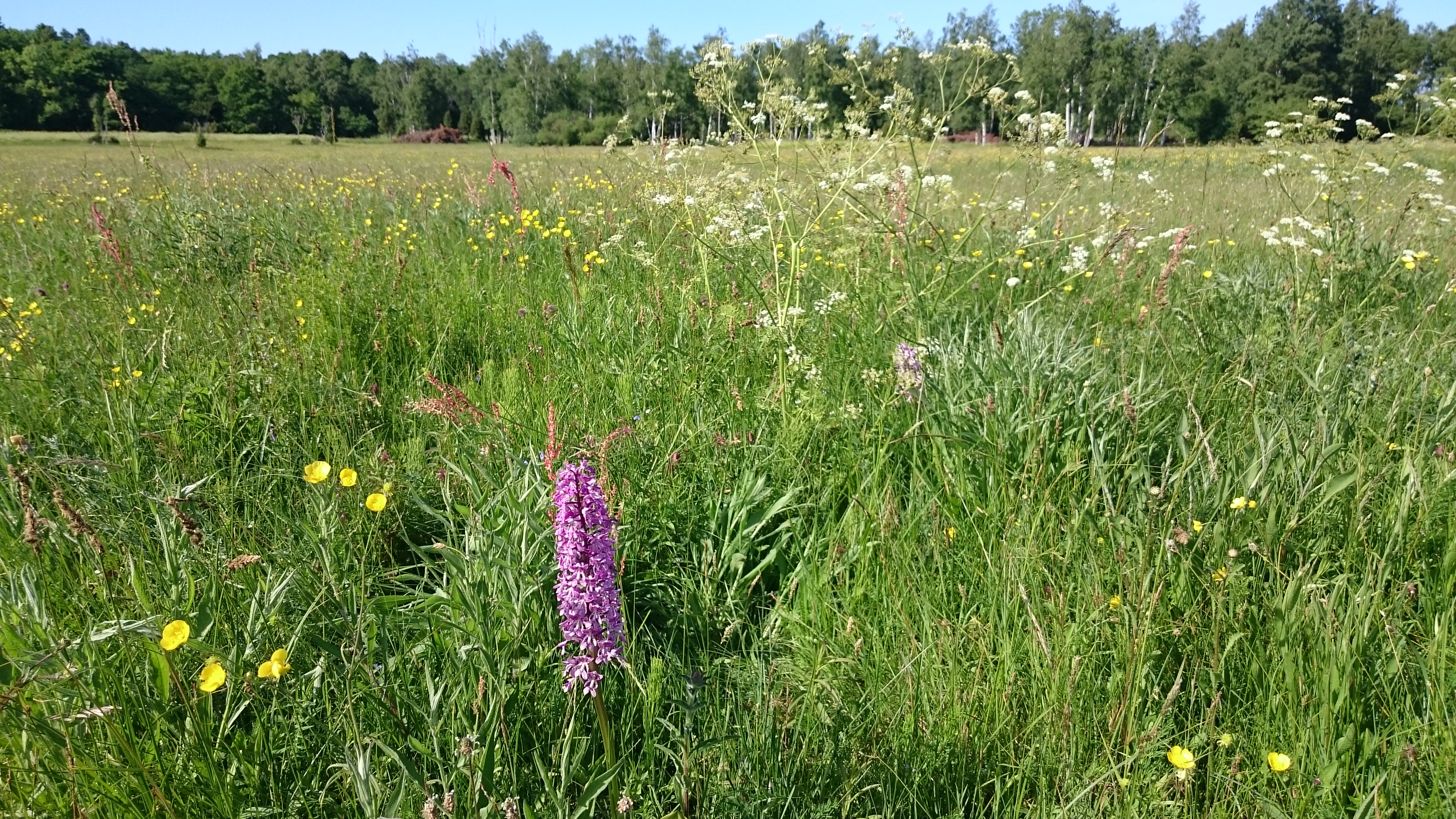

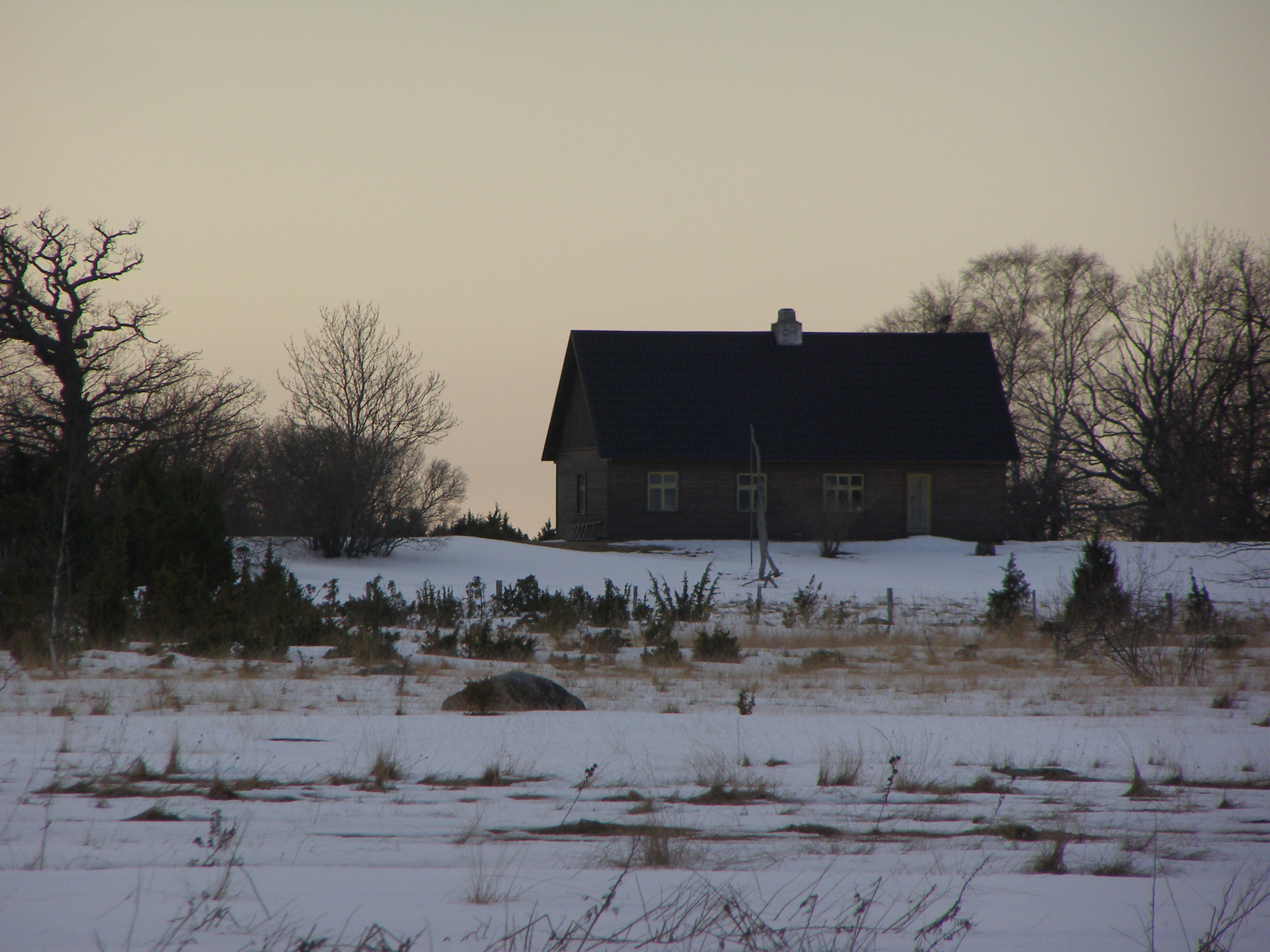

== See also ==
- List of islands of Estonia
