= ComputerWare =

Macintosh retail store chain

- Founded: 1985
- Number of employees: 100 (1998)

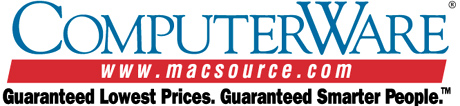
Logo

ComputerWare: The MacSource was a chain of ten Macintosh-only retail stores in the greater San Francisco Bay Area of Northern California founded by Karim Khashoggi and Drew Munster. At one time, they were the largest Macintosh-only reseller in the United States. Guy Kawasaki mentions ComputerWare a number of times in his book, The Macintosh Way. Besides the ten stores, ComputerWare also had a headquarters that held international, direct, and corporate sales departments, and at one time had a full hardware repair depot and various training centers on the Bay Area.

== History ==
The first ComputerWare store was opened on California Avenue in Palo Alto in 1985 by Drew Munster and Karim Khashoggi. They later hired Derek Van Atta as store manager. ComputerWare was originally incorporated as Lightning Development, doing business as ComputerWare; later the corporation was reorganized as ComputerWest dba ComputerWare after David Lipson bought the company from the original founders.

The corporate sales department was formed in 1987.

In 1988 a separate Headquarters was set up at 2800 West Bayshore Avenue in Palo Alto to house administrative, hardware repair, corporate sales, and other departments that were outgrowing the floor above the Palo Alto retail storefront.

In May 1989, ComputerWare expanded to two stores with the opening of their Sunnyvale store on Lawrence Expressway near Fry's Electronics. Then three more stores were opened in rapid succession: the San Francisco store was opened in November in the heart of the financial district. Stores 4 and 5 were opened in December 1989 by acquisitions of MacOrchard in Berkeley and the Computer Center of Santa Cruz.

August 1990 brought a sixth store in San Rafael through acquisition of MacGarden. This location was still in the Macintosh-only retail business as the Marin Mac Shop until mid-2010 when it closed.

Two new stores opened in 1992: a seventh store was opened in Dublin in October, and then in November store number eight opened in Sunnyvale on El Camino Real through acquisition of MacShop.

The hardware repair depot was moved out into its own building, across 101 on East Bayshore from the corporate headquarters in 1993.

1994 brought about the last store openings, building the ComputerWare retail chain to its height of ten stores. The San Mateo location opened in March on El Camino Real, and the Walnut Creek store was opened in December. April of that same year also brought about the move of one of the two Sunnyvale stores (the El Camino MacShop location) to Santa Clara, thereby solidifying full Bay Area coverage.

In November 1995 the lease ran out on the Palo Alto headquarters location, and a larger facility that could house both the headquarters, warehouse, and hardware repair depot was found at 605 West California Avenue in Sunnyvale.

== ComputerWare UK ==
ComputerWare UK, a distribution business in the UK, was founded in 1992, and although some of their products are Apple-compatible, such as trackballs with large buttons and a large ball, it has nothing to do with the failed Apple stores.

ComputerWare UK was founded Rik and Christeen Alexander in order to provide computer input device solutions and test equipment through manufacturers, system integrators, value-added resellers and PC builders. The business objectives included never employing people and never selling software or services although ComputerWare UK are appointed agents acting on behalf of companies in the Middle East and Africa. Rik and Christeen are members of the Finchampstead Cricket Club.

== Apple authorization ==
In November 1991, Apple fully authorized all of the ComputerWare stores as Apple-authorized dealers; before this time, only the Santa Cruz store was an authorized dealer, limited the other stores to software, third-party hardware, cables, and other accessories. After this date, ComputerWare was able to carry the full line of Apple Macintosh products directly from Apple.

In January 1997, ComputerWare received Apple Specialist authorization from Apple Computer for its dedication to the Macintosh platform.

== The downfall ==
In April 2001, ComputerWare announced that it was closing its doors. There were a number of factors that led to the demise of the ComputerWare retail chain. One of the major factors was the owner's loss of faith in Apple, as Apple began to open their own stores.

The owner, David Lipson, looked for a way to sell the company, and when a last-minute deal fell through, put the entire chain into close-out and liquidated the assets.

== The reincarnation ==
Elite Computers & Software bought the rights to the ComputerWare name and other assets in June 2001 and then reopened 4 of the original ComputerWare stores later in 2001. These stores were located In Capitola, Sunnyvale, Berkeley and San Rafael staffed with many of the same employees, store managers and retail management team from the old ComputerWare.

The 4 reopened stores were rebranded with the new name ComputerWare by Elite Computers & Software and became the new expanded retail division of Elite Computers & Software growing from 1 to 5 retail stores in late 2001.

== The second downfall ==
A number of factors lead to the second closing of the four original ComputerWare stores, now branded ComputerWare by Elite Computers & Software in addition to the original Elite Computers & Software store located directly across the street from Apple's worldwide headquarters in Cupertino in 2003.

Pressure from multiple new Apple-owned retail stores being opened and planned near existing ComputerWare by Elite Computers & Software stores, perceived Apple-owned store new product launch allocation favoritism along with changes by Apple to its Apple-authorized dealer contracts contributed to the store closures.

Elite Computers & Software which owned and subsequently closed the five ComputerWare by Elite Computers & Software stores, along with a growing number of Apple-authorized dealers throughout the United States had become unhappy with what the Apple dealers perceived as unfair treatment and unfair competition by Apple Computer, the Apple dealers / Apple Specialists only computer supplier.

This resulted in a number of Apple dealers / Apple Specialists either closing and or filing lawsuits against Apple Computer. Most of these Apple dealers were designated as Apple Specialist and only sold Apple Macintosh computers making this conflict a life or death situation for their stores and businesses.

== The San Rafael store ==
The San Rafael (Marin) store location was reopened for a third time in 2004 under new ownership using the new name C3 Computing Corp, and later as The Marin Mac Shop, before finally closing in 2010.

This former ComputerWare location was still very much like the ComputerWare of lore. The San Rafael location always remained a Macintosh-only storefront until the end. The Marin Mac Shop closed its doors in May 2010.

== External links and sources ==
- ComputerWare Alumni
- Internet Wayback Archive of MacSource.com
- Internet Wayback Archive of ComputerWare.com
- Kanellos, Michael (April 3, 2001). "Apple retailer ComputerWare closes". CNET. Archived from the original on June 16, 2011.
- Fried, Ian (September 10, 2001). "ComputerWare stores to reopen". CNET.
- Silicon Valley/San Jose Business Journal, April 4, 2003 Macintosh Retailer Files Suit, Says Apple Deal Turned Sour
