= Nabih's Inc. =

- Type: Privately held company
- Industry: Computer repair, Computer retail
- Founded: 1972; 54 years ago in Evanston, Illinois
- Founder: Nabih Mangoubi
- Defunct: 2012
- Fate: Dissolution
- Headquarters: Evanston, Illinois, United States
- Area served: Chicago Metropolitan Area
- Products: Apple Inc. computers and accessories
- Website: http://www.nabihs.com/

Nabih's Inc. was a consumer electronics retailer and information technology consultant business that operated for 40 years in the downtown area of Evanston, Illinois, near the Northwestern University campus. Founded by Nabih Mangoubi, the business was one of the oldest Apple Inc. authorized resellers, selling and servicing Apple equipment since 1978, before its closure in 2012.

== History ==
Nabih Mangoubi (born c. 1948 in Egypt) founded Nabih's Inc. in 1972 at the age of 24. Mangoubi, an Egyptian Jew, emigrated with his family to the United States as refugees of the mass expulsion of Jews in Egypt between 1956 and 1957. Mangoubi's father had been a 20-year veteran of the Banque Misr in Cairo when the expulsion forced him to leave two years before he could collect his retirement pension. Between the 1950s and 1960s, the Mangoubi family was forced to slowly sell their possessions to buy time before they could emigrate. When they arrived in Chicago in 1966, they had with them only the equivalent of $20 in 1993 and some clothing.

Nabih's Inc. started out as a reseller of electronic office equipment, chiefly calculators. In 1978 they became one of the first Apple Inc. authorized resellers and began stocking Apple IIs and peripherals. By 1981 they also stocked equipment from Alpha Microsystems, Hewlett-Packard, Texas Instruments, and Vector Graphic.
