= Tekserve =

Consumer electronics and IT business

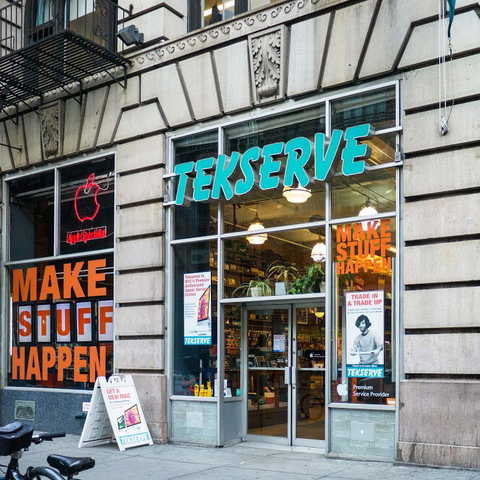
- Store entrance in 2014
- Type: Private
- Industry: Retail; Consulting
- Predecessor: Current Designs
- Founded: New York City, U.S., 1987
- Founder: Richard Demenus; David Lerner
- Successor: T2 Computing
- Headquarters: 40°44′36″N 73°59′36″W; New York City, United States
- Area served: New York metropolitan area
- Services: Apple sales and service
- Number of employees: 200 (2014)

Tekserve was an American consumer electronics and information technology consulting business based in the Flatiron District of Manhattan, New York City. Founded in 1987 as a side business by Macintosh-using engineers designing computer-controlled institutional electronics, Tekserve grew from a small back-office Macintosh repair shop to become the largest single-location Apple Specialist and Premium Service Provider in the United States.

The store announced its closure on August 15, 2016, and the location subsequently became home to the Poster House museum.

== History ==
Tekserve founders David Lerner and Dick Demenus met at the New York City public FM radio station WBAI in 1970, and with engineer Mike Edl set up shop together late in the decade under the name Current Designs Corporation. Their business was electronic engineering and industrial design. They manufactured the indestructible music listening stations to be found at the Lincoln Center branch of the New York Public Library, and early models of the audio listening tours now found in many art museums.

Tekserve was formed as a "sister company under the same roof" dedicated to servicing Macintosh computers and became Apple-authorized for repair in 1993. Tekserve occupied four locations on the same side of the same block in Chelsea: a 3,000-foot (910 m) loft at 115 West 23rd Street; another loft at 163 West 23rd Street (the "Traffic Building"); a larger space on the fourth floor of 155 West 23rd Street, and later expansions to the third floor. In June 2002, the company moved to a 25,000-square-foot (2,300 m^{2}) storefront location at 119 West 23rd Street, occupying the entire first floor of the Printing Arts Building (which extends through to 24th street). The first three locations were notable for their eccentric decor, including an antique ten-cent Coke machine, and a porch swing.

In 2014, Tekserve birthed a business-to-business enterprise, T2 Computing, based on core competencies and experiences, which continues to operate. T2 became part of Axispoint in 2017, the latter acquiring the right to the Tekserve brand name.

On June 29, 2016, The New York Times reported the retail store and service center would close, while certain elements of the business remained open. It ultimately closed a few weeks before the end of its lease due to changes in shopping habits, the presence of multiple Apple stores and increased rent.

== In popular culture ==
- Several television series, including Law & Order and Sex and the City, have utilized Tekserve's facilities as a shooting location.
- In Sex and the City episode 408, "My Motherboard, Myself," Aasif Mandvi was featured as a Tekserve employee attempting to recover data from Carrie Bradshaw's portable computer at the smaller 155 West 23rd Street location.
- LaserWriter II, a novel by Tamara Shopsin, is about a 19-year-old girl who gets a job at Tekserve. The book introduces many different employees and offers a semi-fictional peek into the daily life of a printer technician at Tekserve.
- American Pickers visited the store shortly before closing and purchased some items from the owner's personal collection. Other pieces from the store's Mac Museum ultimately ended up in a museum in Kyiv, Ukraine operated by MacPaw.
