= Mammee apple =

Mammee apple, mamey apple or mammey apple is a common name for several plants which produce edible fruit, and may refer to:

- Mammea africana
- Mammea americana
