= Apple Creek =

Apple Creek may refer to these places in the United States:

== Communities ==
- Apple Creek, Missouri
- Apple Creek, Ohio
- Apple Creek, Wisconsin

== Watercourse ==
- Apple Creek (Mississippi River), Missouri
