= Poster House =

Art museum in Manhattan, New York

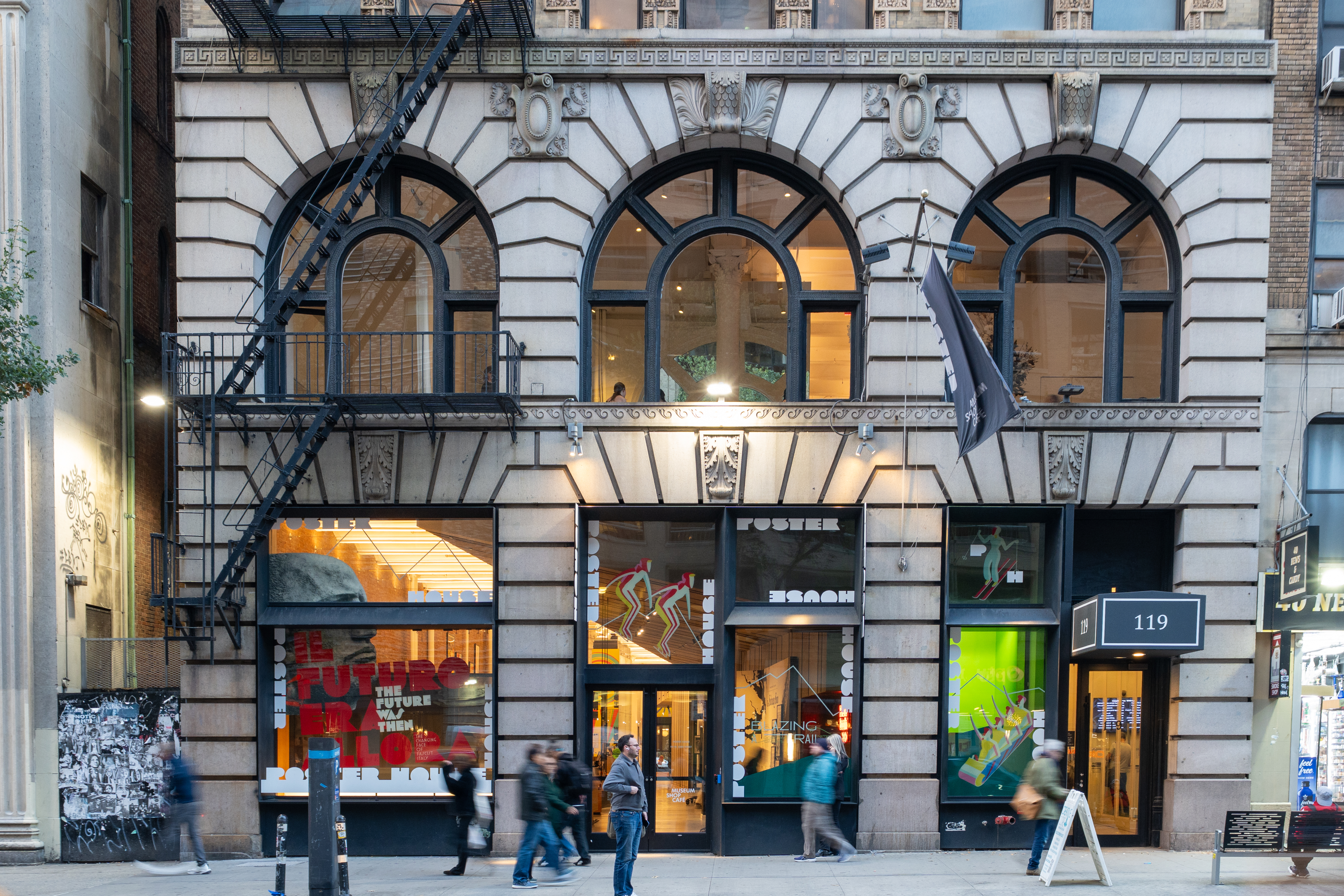
- 119 West 23rd Street, New York, NY
- Established: 2015
- Location: 119 West 23rd Street; New York, New York 10011
- Coordinates: 40.74335°N 73.99349°W
- Type: Art museum
- Director: Angelina Lippert
- President: Val Crosswhite
- Architect: LTL Architects
- Public transit access: New York City Bus: M7, M20, M23 SBS, M55; New York City Subway: at 23rd Street; train at 23rd Street; trains to 23rd Street or 28th Street; trains to 23rd Street; Port Authority Trans-Hudson: HOB-33, JSQ-33 (via HOB), or JSQ-33 to 23rd Street
- Website: posterhouse.org

Poster House is the first museum in the United States dedicated exclusively to posters. Located in Chelsea, Manhattan, New York City, on 23rd Street between Sixth Avenue and Seventh Avenue, the museum opened to the public on June 20, 2019.

== History ==
Poster House was incorporated in 2015 and opened to the public on June 20, 2019. Its logo was designed by Paula Scher of Pentagram. The museum space, which formerly housed an Apple products repair store by the name of Tekserve, was redesigned by LTL Architects and Lumen Architecture.

== Collection ==
When Poster House opened in 2019, its permanent collection contained approximately 7,000 posters from 100 different countries. This included 3,000 pieces related to the 2017 Women's March as well as 98 Subway Series posters. The Subway Series donation was made by the School of Visual Arts. It includes works by Milton Glaser, Louise Fili, and Paula Scher.

The museum's collection contains works ranging from the late 1800s through the present day. The contemporary works are contained in a living archive that Poster House adds to on a regular basis. The museum draws from both its historic and contemporary collections to stage exhibitions focused on a particular artist, movement, or theme.

== Select exhibitions ==
Poster House's first exhibition, in June 2019, featured more than 80 posters by the Czech graphic designer Alphonse Mucha. A February 2020 exhibition called The Swiss Grid examined influential Swiss design and typographic style.

In April 2021, Poster House held an exhibition featuring the work of Julius Klinger. In September 2021, the museum opened You Can't Bleed Me, which displayed posters and marketing materials from notable Blaxploitation films such as Slaughter and Coffy. That same month, it opened an exhibition containing over 200 posters from the New York-based design and illustration firm Push Pin Studios.

In March 2022, Poster House opened Ethel Reed: I Am My Own Person, a show featuring poster and magazine cover illustrations Reed designed in the late 19th and early 20th centuries.

Black Power to Black People, an exhibition featuring the history, art, and branding of the Black Panther Party, began in March 2023. That month also marked the opening of Made in Japan, which focused on World War II and Post-War Era Japanese poster art. Other 2023 exhibitions included Art Deco: Commercializing the Avant-Garde, a 53-piece show examining the use of Art Deco in mid-century advertisements, and We Tried To Warn You!, which featured environmental movement posters and advertisements from the 1970s through the 2000s.

== Special projects ==
In April 2020, Poster House and Print collaborated on a public safety campaign called #CombatCOVID. The campaign employed graphic designers including Jessica Hische, Maira Kalman, and Edel Rodriguez, who created a series of posters communicating public safety guidelines and encouraging sentiment to New York City residents. These posters were displayed on approximately 1,700 digital advertising spaces across the five boroughs.

Poster House also partnered with food writer and historian Grace Young to create Coronavirus: Chinatown Stories, a video series in which Young documented the difficulties small businesses in Manhattan's Chinatown were experiencing during the pandemic. Young received the 2022 Julia Child Award, in part due to her work on the series. The award was presented to her by Poster House's Julia Knight.
