= Love apple =

The term love apple may refer to:

- The tomato (Solanum lycopersicum)
- The wax apple (Syzygium samarangense)
