= Apple Authorized Service Provider =

Official Apple device repairer

Logo for the Apple Authorized Service Provider program

Apple Authorized Service Providers (previously called Apple Specialist Resellers) are independent companies which are certified by Apple, which carry out in-warranty or out-of-warranty repairs of Apple products as part of the company's AppleCare program. Apple provides retailers and repairers with tools, training, and service manuals. All technicians working on these repairs must be Apple Certified Technicians. Examples of Apple Authorized Service Providers include Best Buy and Simply Mac.

== History ==
The concept of the service originated with Richard Haddock, who was friends with Gil Amelio, then CEO of Apple, and recommended that they form a reseller channel designation. Dr. Amelio assigned Paddy Wong and Loretta Flores of Apple the task of designing the program, with input from a few resellers.

Apple rolled out the Apple Specialist Program in December 1996. It continued under that name through 2016. Apple has since disbanded the Specialist Program and moved on to Premier Partners. This program involves meeting higher quality standards. Service providers who are unable to meet these standards are dropped to a Value-added resellers.

In 2019, Apple introduced a similar program to the Apple Authorized Service Provider Program, the Independent Repair Provider Program, which allows for independent businesses to do out-of-warranty service. The program was criticized by Motherboard as "invasive" for unannounced inspections by Apple and required telemetry being required to join the program.

Apple, in 2022, launched the Self Service Repair program, which provides the owners of Apple devices, that have the skills to, the opportunity and permission repair their own devices at home, providing them access to the same manuals, genuine Apple parts, and tools used at Apple Store locations and Apple Authorized Service Providers. This is, as of May of 2025, available to over 65 different Apple products and in 36 nations. The used or damaged parts are to be sent to Apple for refurbishment or recycling.

Apple’s Genuine Parts Distributor program, also launched in May of 2025, allows the purchase of parts for Apple products from a Self Service Repair Store or a Genuine Parts Distributor. A Genuine Parts Distributor is a seller that is authorized to sell Apple parts.

== See also ==
- Apple certification programs
- Right to repair
- MFi Program
