= New Generation (The Chambers Brothers album) =

Studio album by The Chambers Brothers
- Released: 1971
- Genres: Rock and funk
- Label: Columbia C 30032
- Producer: The Chambers Brothers

The Chambers Brothers chronology
Feelin' the Blues (1969)	New Generation (1971)	Oh My God (1972)

New Generation is a 1971 album by The Chambers Brothers. It contains their hits "Are You Ready" and "Funky". It also represented a new phase for the band in their production.

== Background ==
The Chambers Brothers produced New Generation themselves. The orchestrations were arranged by Joe Chambers and Brian Keenan.

By 1970, the Chambers Brothers already had recorded three albums for the Columbia label, The Time Has Come, A New Time – A New Day, and Love, Peace and Happiness. According to an article about the band in the April 1971 issue of Hit Parader, their manager, Charles LaMarr said that the band wasn't satisfied with their three previous albums. Joe Chambers said that the producers assigned to them weren't willing to listen to their ideas as well as how the band's presentation should be. He said that they had worked very hard and didn't now want to risk their sound. Joe also said that they wanted to produce other acts, and Brooklyn Bridge was one that they would possibly produce. He also said that this was their time. The band had been experimenting with new instruments. They had played with 22-piece orchestra at Carnegie Hall. In a 31 October 1970 article by Billboard, Joe Chambers said that he could see their future working with a large band.

New Generation was released on Columbia C 30032 in 1971.

It was reported in the 6 February issue of Cash Box that Columbia Records hosted a party for The Chambers Brothers at Beaver's in Chicago to promote their new album, New Generation. The single from the album was announced as "Funky".

Along with Spencer Davis & Peter Jameson, and Taj Mahal, the Chambers Brothers played at the Fillmore East venue on 13 February 1971. Their set featured a funky long rendition of their title song which featured feedback and solid guitar lines.

== Reception ==
The album was reviewed in the 30 January 1971 issue of Cash Box. One of the four Pop Best Bets albums, the review was positive with the reviewer writing that the band had it all together with a new and impressive package of funk and rock. Due the band's large commercial and underground following, the album was predicted to do well.

The album was reviewed in the 6 February issue of Record World. The reviewer pointed out the excellent cuts which were, "Practice What You Preach", "Reflections" and "Going to the Mill". The reviewer wrote that the rest of the album was standard, but standard for the Chambers Brothers wouldn't deter their fans.

== Airplay ==
As shown in the 30 January 1971 issue of Record World, New Generation was being played on WMMS-FM in Cleveland, KSHE-FM in S. Louis and KSAN-FM in San Francisco.

== Charts ==
The New Generation album debuted at No. 197 in the Billboard Top LPs chart for the week of 27 February. The album debuted at No. 40 In the Billboard Best Selling Soul LP's chart for the week of 27 March. In its sixth charting week, the album peaked at No. 145 on the Billboard Top LP's chart for the week of 3 April. Having been in the Best Selling Soul LP's chart for three weeks, the album peaked at No. 36 for the week of 10 April.

== Tracks ==
=== Side A ===
1. "Are You Ready" - J. Chambers - 3:47
2. "Young Girl" - L. Chambers, W. Chambers - 3:35
3. "Funky", L. Chambers - 2:52
4. "When The Evening Comes" – C. LaMarr - 6:37
5. "Practice What You Preach" - J. Chambers - 3:29

=== Side B ===
1. "Reflections" – G. Chambers- 5:20
2. "Pollution" – J. Chambers - 1:45
3. "New Generation" – C. LaMarr, J. Chambers - 11:54
4. "Going To the Mill" – C. LaMarr, J. Chambers - 5:15

== Singles ==
- "Are You Ready" was written by Julius N. Chambers, the cousin and tour manager of The Chambers Brothers. It was backed with a Willie Chambers composition, "You Got the Power to Turn Me On", and was released on Columbia 4-44779 in February 1969. Tim O'Brien produced the single.
- "Funky" was written by Lester Chambers. Backed with "Love Peace and Happiness", it was released on Columbia 45277. The credited producer for the song was The Chambers Brothers.
- "New Generation" was written by Julius Chambers and Charles LaMarr. Backed with LaMarr's composition, "When the Evening Comes", it was released on Columbia 4-45394 in May 1971. Both sides were produced by The Chambers Brothers.
