= Are You Ready (The Chambers Brothers song) =

Single by The Chambers Brothers

from the album New Generation
- A-side: "Are You Ready"
- B-side: "You Got the Power to Turn Me On"
- Released: 1969
- Length: 3:35
- Label: Columbia 4-44779
- Composer: Julius N. Chambers
- Producer: Tim O'Brien

US singles chronology
"Time Has Come Today" (1969)	"Are You Ready" (1969)	"Wake Up" (1969)

"Are You Ready" is a 1969 single by The Chambers Brothers. It made the Billboard, Cash Box and Record World charts that year.

== Background ==
"Are You Ready" was written by Julius N. Chambers who was the cousin and tour manager of The Chambers Brothers. Under the direction of Tim O'Brien, The Chambers Brothers recorded it. Backed with a Willie Chambers composition, "You Got the Power to Turn Me On", it was released on Columbia 4-44779 in February 1969. It followed a US re-release of "Time Has Come Today" on Columbia Hall of Fame series (cat# 4-33136) that year. It was followed by "Wake Up" on Columbia 4-44890 that year.

It was released in the UK on CBS 58-4098.

== Reception ==
The single was a Pick of the Week in the 8 March 1969 issue of Cash Box. The review was positive with the reviewer making note of the potential to become an instant breakout.

For the week of 22 March, programmer Sebastian Tripp of radio WKBR in Manchester, New Hampshire had the record down as the week's Best Pick.

== Airplay ==
The Chambers Brothers were pictured with the Smothers Brothers in the 1 March issue of Cash Box. They had recently been presented with a gold record by the Smothers Brothers for their The Time Has Come album. They also performed their latest single, "Are You Ready" on the brothers show.

It was reported in the 8 March 1969 issue of Cash Box that 7% of radio stations who reported their statistics had added "Are You Ready" to their playlists. With 23% of radio stations having added "Are You Ready" to their playlists by 15 March, it was shown in the Cash Box Radio Active chart that the total to date was now 30%.

== Charts ==
For the week of 15 March 1969 "Are You Ready" debuted at No. 21 in the Cash Box Looking Ahead chart. It peaked at No. 19 the following week, and was still in the chart for the week of 29 March.

For the week of 15 March, "Are You Ready" was at No. 125 in the Billboard Bubbling Under the Hot 100 chart. It peaked at No. 113 for the week of 29 March.

By 22 March, the single was already at No. 24 in the Record World Singles Coming Up chart. It peaked at No. 18 for the week of 12 April.

== Later years ==
Along with the Chambers Brothers' "Love, Peace and Happiness", "Are You Ready" was recorded in Las Vegas in 2016 for the Power of Peace album by The Isley Brothers and Santana.
