= Unbonded =

Studio album by The Chambers Brothers
- Released: 1974
- Label: Avco
- Producer: Jimmy Ienner

The Chambers Brothers chronology
| Oh My God (1972) | Unbonded (1974) | Right Move (1975) |

Unbonded is a 1974 album for The Chambers Brothers. It contains their hit single, "Let's Go, Let's Go, Let's Go". It also made the charts that year.

== Background ==
The album was produced by Jimmy Ienner. The engineer for the recording was Ed Stasium.

The LP version was released in the United States on Avco AV-11013. The eight track cartridge version was released on 87C11013, and the cassette version was released on CAS11013.

== Reception ==
The album was a Pop Pick in the 5 January 1974 issue of Cash Box. The review was highly positive with the reviewer saying that the Chambers Brothers were right on time with this gem. The review was finished off with "if you want to treat yourself to an unparalled musical delight" to get into the album.

An album Pick in the 19 January issue of Billboard, it received a positive review. According to the reviewer, the ten pop and r &b classics had been livened up by the Chambers Brothers who had given them what was described as their distinctive flair. The picks were, "Let's Go, Let's Go, Let's Go", "Good Vibrations" and "Do You Believe in Magic".

With the Chambers Brothers version of "The Weight", Dan Epstein of Forward had their version at no. 12 in a list of the Top 25 versions of the song. With the song sung by George Chambers, the Chambers' bassist, he said that the "song gradually builds from a groovy country-funk hootenanny to a stirring gospel tent revival". Epstein also referred to the album as underrated.

== Airplay ==
For the week of 19 January, Unbonded was added to the playlists of FM stations, WBRU-FM, WPLR-FM, WVVS-FM, WOWI-FM, WORJ FM, and WOUR-FM. For the week of 26 January, the album was added to the playlist of WOUR-FM and KFMY-FM.

== Charts ==
The album debuted at no. 54 in the Billboard Soul LP's chart for the week of 9 February 1974. After seven weeks on the chart, the album peaked at no. 44 for the week of 23 March.

== Album details ==
Avco AV-11013
| Track | Title | Lead vocal | Composer | Time | Notes |
|---|---|---|---|---|---|
| A1 | "Reflections" | Lester | Holland–Dozier–Holland | 4:29 | |
| A2 | "Let's Go, Let's Go, Let's Go | Willie | Hank Ballard | 3:20 | |
| A3 | "The Weight" | George | R. Robertson | 4:51 | |
| A4 | "1-2-3" | Lester | D. White, J. Madara, L. Borisoff | 3:32 | |
| A5 | "If Loving You Is Wrong, I Don't Want to Be Right" | Willie | C. Hampton, H. Banks, R. Jackson | 5:43 | |
| B1 | "Good Vibrations" | George, Joe, Lester, Willie | B. Wilson, M. Love | 4:39 | |
| B2 | "Gypsy Woman" | George | Curtis Mayfield | 2:51 | |
| B3 | "I (Who Have Nothing)" | Joe | Donida, Leiber, Stoller, Mogol | 3:29 | |
| B4 | "Do You Believe in Magic" | Joe | John Sebastian | 2:59 | |
| B5 | "Looking Back" | Willie | Hendricks, Benton, Otis | 2:20 | |
