= Uptown (The Chambers Brothers song) =

Song by The Chambers Brothers

from the album Time Has Come
- A-side: "Uptown"
- B-side: "Love Me Like the Rain"
- Released: 1967
- Label: Columbia 4-44296
- Composer: B. Mabry
- Producer: David Rubinson

The Chambers Brothers singles chronology
"I Can't Stand It" (1967)	"Uptown" (1967)	"Time Has Come Today" (1967)

"Uptown" aka "Uptown to Harlem" is a 1967 single by The Chambers Brothers". It was a minor chart hit for them that year.

== Background ==
"Uptown" is said to be inspired by Betty Mabry's difficulty getting a taxi and her fascination with the city of Harlem. It is also known as "Uptown to Harlem".

Mabry found out that the Chambers Brothers were in New York so she went to see them and sang the song to them. The group wanted new material, and the timing was right as they were soon to go into the studio. According to Lester Chambers, they were getting out of the car and Betty Mabry who they had met at a club came running up to them and said that she had just written this song for him because she knew he could sing it. Chambers said that they went upstairs and presented the song to David Rubinson and the song was quickly worked out. With Rubinson handling the production duties, the Chambers Brothers recorded the Betty Mabry composition "Uptown". It was backed with Brian Keenan's "Love me Like the Rain" and released on Columbia 44296. "Uptown" is included on the Chambers Brothers' 1967 album, Time Has Come.

Rock group Black Pearl recorded the song which appears on their Live! album, released in 1970. The song has also been recorded by Paul Martin & Sound Factory and released on the Van label in 1971. Johnny Thunders and Patti Palladin recorded their version of the song which was included on their 1988 Copy Cats album.

The song being performed by The Chambers Brothers is featured in Ahmir Khalib Thompson's documentary, Summer of Soul.

Audie Cornish referred to the song as an ode to Harlem. The lyrics include the statement, "I'm going uptown to Harlem to let my hair down in Harlem".

== Reception ==
"Uptown" was one of the records in the Pick of the Week section of the 23 September issue of Cash Box. The reviewer referred to it as a "heavy rhythmic blues-rock throbber", and said that it would do good at r&b and pop outlets.

The song was a Billboard R&B Spotlight pick for the week of 30 September.

Years later in a Guardian article about Betty Mabry, the Chambers Brothers' performance of "Uptown" at the 1968 Harlem Cultural Festival was mentioned. The song they performed was described as a slinky version.

== Charts ==
By 4 November, Billboard had reported that the song was now a regional breakout.

The single debuted at No. 126 in the Billboard Bubbling Under Hot 100 chart for the week of 18 November.

It was reported in the 2 December issue of Record World that "Uptown" was now an R&B Smash and in the Top Five in St. Louis.
