= Sidetracks (album) =

Compilation album by Steve Earle
- Released: April 9, 2002
- Genre: Country, Country rock
- Label: Artemis Records

Steve Earle chronology
Transcendental Blues (2000)	Sidetracks (2002)	Jerusalem (2002)

Professional ratings
Review scores
Source	Rating
Allmusic	link
Music Box	link

Sidetracks is a compilation album by Steve Earle. The album was released in 2002.

== Track listing ==
All songs written by Steve Earle unless otherwise noted.

1. "Some Dreams" - 3:04
2. "Open Your Window" - 3:51
3. "Me and the Eagle" - 4:55
4. "Johnny Too Bad" - 4:09 (Winston Bailey, Roy Beckford, Derrick Leapold Crooks, Delroy George Wilson)
5. "Dominick St." - 3:10 (Steve Earle, Sharon Shannon)
6. "Breed" - 2:44 (Kurt Cobain)
7. "Time Has Come Today" - 4:16 (Joseph Chambers, Willie Chambers)
8. "Ellis Unit One" - 4:40
9. "Creepy Jackalope Eye" - 3:05 (Ed Daly, Dan Bolton, Dan Siegal, Ron Heathman (Supersuckers))
10. "Willin'" - 4:04 (Lowell George)
11. "Sara's Angel" - 3:02
12. "My Uncle" - 3:29 (Chris Hillman, Gram Parsons)
13. "My Back Pages" - 4:08 (Bob Dylan)

== Chart performance ==
Chart (2002)	Peak position
Australian Albums (ARIA Charts)	82
U.S. Billboard Top Country Albums	9
U.S. Billboard 200	109
U.S. Billboard Independent Albums	6
