= The April Fools =

1969 film by Stuart Rosenberg

- Theatrical release poster (One sheet)
- Directed by: Stuart Rosenberg
- Written by: Hal Dresner
- Produced by: Gordon Carroll
- Starring: Jack Lemmon; Catherine Deneuve; Peter Lawford; Jack Weston; Myrna Loy; Charles Boyer
- Cinematography: Michel Hugo
- Edited by: Bob Wyman
- Music by: Marvin Hamlisch
- Production companies: Cinema Center Films; Jalem Productions
- Distributed by: National General Pictures
- Release date: May 28, 1969 (New York)
- Running time: 95 minutes
- Country: United States
- Language: English
- Budget: $2,750,000
- Box office: $4.5 million (US/Canada rentals)

The April Fools is a 1969 American romantic comedy film directed by Stuart Rosenberg and starring Jack Lemmon and Catherine Deneuve. The film was produced through Lemmon's independent film production company, Jalem Productions.

== Plot ==
Wall Street broker Howard Brubaker is married to Phyllis, who does not love him. Catherine is the stunning French wife of an equally uncaring husband, Howard's philandering boss, Ted Gunther.

The evening of the day Ted promotes Howard, Howard attends Ted's house party where Ted urges him to pick up an available woman there and proceeds to show him how. Howard reluctantly tries it on Catherine, who instantly accepts. The two leave the party and go out for a little adventure on the town. Ted is oblivious, as he is concentrating on other women at the party.

The two find their marriages are loveless as they discover more about each other that night and decide to run away together the next evening. However, Ted does not realize the other man is Howard until Howard and Catherine are about to board the plane to Paris.

== Cast ==
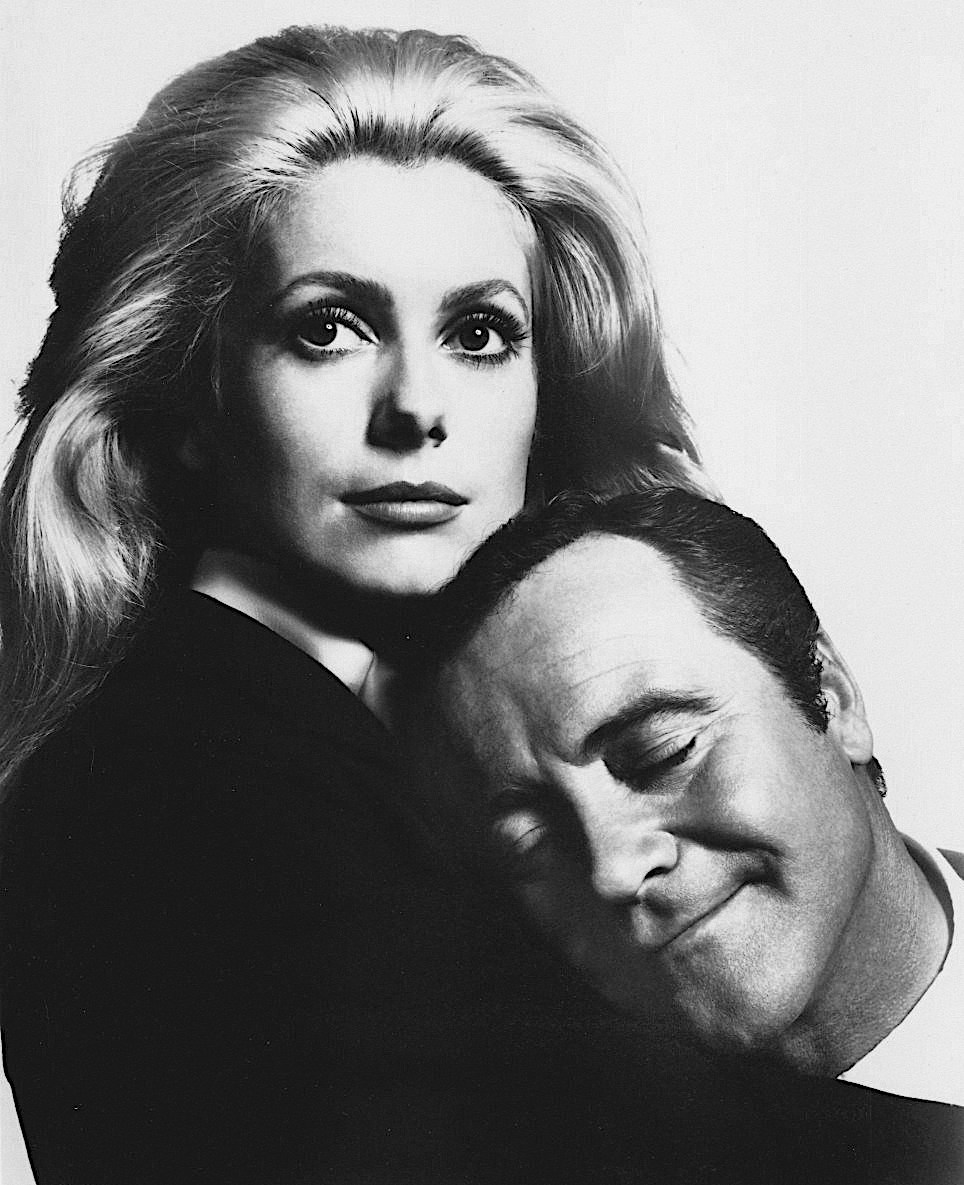
Catherine Deneuve and Jack Lemmon

- Jack Lemmon as Howard Brubaker
- Catherine Deneuve as Catherine Gunther
- Peter Lawford as Ted Gunther
- Myrna Loy as Grace Greenlaw
- Charles Boyer as Andre Greenlaw
- Jack Weston as Potter Shrader
- Janice Carroll as Mimsy Shrader
- Sally Kellerman as Phyllis Brubaker
- Gary Dubin as Stanley Brubaker
- Melinda Dillon as Leslie Hopkins
- Kenneth Mars as Les Hopkins
- David Doyle as Orlow P. Walters
- Susan Barrett as house party singer
- Dee Gardner as Naomi Jackson
- Harvey Korman as Matt Benson
- Lisa Todd as Safari Club waitress

== Production ==
Jack Lemmon bought the property through his independent film production company, Jalem Production, in August 1965. The film was to be produced by Gordon Carroll, who was vice-president of Jalem Productions, and the producers signed Stuart Rosenberg to direct the picture, who was under a five-year, three-film non-exclusive contract with the company. It was supposed to be the first film made by Rosenberg for Jalem Productions, but Cool Hand Luke was filmed and released first. Finance was provided by Cinema Center Films, who also made The War Between Men and Women for Jalem.

The female lead was originally going to be played by Shirley MacLaine, but she was not available due to commitments on Sweet Charity and campaigning for Robert F. Kennedy. Catherine Deneuve was cast instead. On 22 July 1968, filming began in New York City. On 23 October 1968, Variety announced filming completion.

== Release ==
The film opened on May 28, 1969, at the New Embassy Theatre and the Pacific East theatre in New York City. It grossed $42,000 in its opening week. After three weeks exclusively in New York, it also opened in Chicago and Philadelphia before expanding to 18 more cities a week later. It reached number one at the US box office in July after eight weeks of release.

== Reception ==
A reviewer for The New York Times wrote that the film "manipulates its stereotypes with elegance and style. ... The best things in the movie, however, are the extraordinarily good supporting performances by Peter Lawford (as Miss Deneuve's husband), Jack Weston, Harvey Korman, Sally Kellerman, and by two stars who invented movie elegance almost 30 years ago, Charles Boyer and Myrna Loy."

== Soundtrack ==
The musical soundtrack was released on Columbia Masterworks OS 3340 in 1969. It features "The April Fools", "Peter's Pad", "I Remember the Rain" and "Minuet" by Percy Faith, His Orchestra and Chorus, "La La La" by Mongo Santamaria, "Wake Up" by The Chambers Brothers, "Sugar Kite" by California, "Flame" by Robert John, "Give Your Woman What She Wants" by Taj Mahal.

== Paperback novelization ==
Published slightly in advance of the film's release (as was the usual custom of the era), a paperback screenplay novelization by the tie-in scribe William Johnston was issued by Popular Library.

== Home media ==
The April Fools was released on DVD by CBS Home Entertainment through Paramount Home Media Distribution on January 28, 2014, as a Region 1 Widescreen DVD.

== See also ==
- List of American films of 1969
