= I Can't Turn You Loose =

1965 single by Otis Redding

"I Can't Turn You Loose" is a song written and first recorded by American soul singer Otis Redding. In 1968 The Chambers Brothers would have success with the song.

Parts of the melody were used by the Blues Brothers to both open and close their shows, including their performances in the Blues Brothers movie and their performance on Saturday Night Live.

== Otis Redding version ==
"I Can't Turn You Loose"

Single by Otis Redding
- A-side: "Just One More Day"
- Released: 1965
- Genre: Soul
- Length: 2:46
- Label: Atco
- Songwriter: Otis Redding

Otis Redding singles chronology
"Just One More Day" (1965)	"I Can't Turn You Loose" (1965)	"My Girl" (1965)

It was released as the B-side to his 1965 single "Just One More Day". The up-tempo song became a bigger hit on the US R&B chart than its A-side and was one of Redding's signature songs and often appeared in his live performances.

=== Chart history ===
Chart performance for "I Can't Turn You Loose" by Otis Redding
Chart (1965)	Peak position
US Billboard Hot Rhythm & Blues Singles	11

== Chambers Brothers version ==
"I Can't Turn You Loose"

Single by The Chambers Brothers

from the album A New Time - A New Day
- B-side: "Do Your Thing"
- Released: 1968
- Recorded: 1968
- Genre: Psychedelic rock
- Length: 4:50
- Label: Columbia
- Songwriter: Otis Redding
- Producer: Tim O'Brien

The Chambers Brothers singles chronology
"Time Has Come Today" (1968)	"I Can't Turn You Loose" (1968)	"Shout! - Part 1" (1968)

=== Background ===
The Chambers Brothers worked with producer Tim O'Brien and released their version of this song in 1968. Backed with "Do Your Thing", which was composed by B. Keenan, L. Chambers, J. Chambers, W. Chambers and G. Chambers, it was released in the United States on Columbia 4-44679 in October 1968.

The lead singer on the song is Lester Chambers.

=== Reception ===
As reported in the Money Music feature in the 2 November issue of Record World, Ted Atkins at CKLW in Detroit had the song as an LP Cut Hit with his 3:15 edit from the A New Time – A New Day album. It was reported the following week that the song was now a smash at CKLW.

Now having been released as a single, "I Can't Turn You Loose" was reviewed in the 16 November issue of Record World where it was a Four Star Pick. The reviewer made note of the song's excitement and the youth appeal.

=== Airplay ===
The Chambers Brothers' version of "I Can't Turn You Loose" was at No. 1 in the Record World Top Play section for the week of 7 December 1968.

In just the East it was at No. 25 at WMCA in New York, No. 20 at WRKO in Boston, No. 21 at WPRO in Providence, No. 24 at WLLH in Lowell, No. 52 at WDRC in Hartford.

=== Charts US ===
==== Record World ====
"I Can't Turn You Loose" debuted at No. 76 in the Record World 100 Top Pops chart for the week of 23 November. It peaked at No. 32 for the week of 14 December and held that position for an additional week.

==== Billboard ====
It reached number 37 on the Billboard Hot 100 singles chart.

=== Charts Canada ===
==== RPM Weekly ====
In Canada it reached number 29.
