= Stephen Rowe =

Stephen Rowe may refer to:

- Stephen Rowe (footballer) (born 1965), Australian rules footballer
- Stephen Rowe (poet) (born 1980), Canadian poet
- Stephen Rowe (musician), Australian country singer

== See also ==
- Steve Rowe (born 1965), Australian musician
- Steve Rowe (businessman), British businessman, CEO of Marks & Spencer
- G. Steven Rowe, American politician
