= Pollution (disambiguation) =

Pollution is the introduction of contaminants into the natural environment that cause adverse change. In other words pollution means a sudden change in the environment due to harmful pollutants released to the environment.

Pollution may also refer to:

- Pollution (album), a 1972 album by Franco Battiato, or its title song
- "Pollution", a song by Baby Bash from his 2003 album Tha Smokin' Nephew
- "Pollution", a song by Caliban from their 1999 album A Small Boy and a Grey Heaven
- "Pollution", a song by Fun-Da-Mental from their 2001 album There Shall Be Love!
- "Pollution", a song by Limp Bizkit from their 1997 album Three Dollar Bill, Y'all
- "Pollution", a song by Neurosis from their 1989 EP Aberration
- "Pollution", a song by Reset from their 1999 album No Limits
- "Pollution", a song by Tom Lehrer
- "Pollution", a song by The Chambers Brothers from their 1971 album New Generation
- "Pollution" (The Goodies), a 1971 episode of the TV series 'The Goodies'
