= Jessie Sparks =

- Origin: Melbourne, Victoria
- Genres: Rock, pop, blues
- Occupation: Musician
- Years active: 2000s, 2010s - ?
- Labels: Out of the Box Records, Ocean Front Records

Jessie Sparks is an Australian singer who sings in a style that draws from various genres. She has worked with members of the Chambers Brothers as well as Ricky Hendrix and Rosa Brooks.

== Background ==
Sparks is originally from Melbourne, Australia. She is a 2010 Musicbizpro online contest winner and a HMMA 08 Best Adult Contemporary Award winner. Her singing style ranges across soul, blues, folk and rock. In 2007, her album Breathe Easy was released.

While Sparks was in Los Angeles, she performed on stage with Riki Hendrix, the cousin of Jimi Hendrix and singer, Rosa Lee Brooks.

== Career ==
In early 2008, working with guitarist Mark Donnelly, keyboardist Nathan Liow and bassist Ken Lim, Jessie Sparks released her indie album, Breathe Easy. It was described by John Carver of PBS Radio as "seductive, intelligent and engrossing". It had a significant amount of airplay on ABC, SBS and PBS.

In 2009, Sparks was getting busy and moving along in her career. It was reported in January that year that she had received a Hollywood Music Award nomination for "Best Female Vocal". She was to appear in episode 11 of 'Rad Girls TV that was airing on MAVTV in March that year.

In 2010, Sparks was the winner of Musicbizpro's search for best artist contest which took place between September and October that year.

It was reported by Press-Telegram that Willie Chambers and Joe Chambers had come out of their retirement to back Jessie Sparks on her upcoming EP. On 30 April 2012, her Jessie Sparks EP was released. It featured the track "Calendar Years" which had Willie and Joe Chambers on backing vocals. The additional musicians were Louis Metoyer on guitar, Warlock on bass and Matthew Oloffson on drums. "Calendar Years" had made it to no. 1 on the New Music Weekly Mainstream Top 30 Countdown in October and November 2011. It also got to no. 3 on the NMW AC40 Indie Chart and no. 9 on the AC40 Main Chart. Additionally, it got to no 5 on the NMW Top40 Indie Chart, no. 14 on the Top40 Main Chart and no. 9 on the Hot 100 Unsigned Artists chart in the months of October, November and December. It got to no. 28 on the FMQB Top 200 Chart and no. 28 on the FMQB AC40 Chart. It had also registered on the Mediabase/Billboard Top Adds chart that year.
