= Love, Peace and Happiness (song) =

Single by The Chambers Brothers

from the album Love, Peace and Happiness
- A-side: "Love, Peace and Happiness"
- B-side: "If You Want Me To"
- Released: January 20, 1970
- Length: Single 4:10; Album 16:16
- Label: Columbia 4-45088
- Composer: Chambers Bros.
- Producer: David Rubinson

US singles chronology
"Just A Closer Walk with Thee" (1969)	"Love, Peace and Happiness" (1970)	"Let's Do It (Do It Together)" (1970)

"Love, Peace and Happiness" is a 1970 song by American psychedelic soul band, the Chambers Brothers. It appeared on the album of the same name, and was a hit in 1970.

== Background ==
The single was released on Columbia (4-45088), backed with a Spyder Turner composition, "If You Want Me To". Produced by David Rubinson, it was released in the UK on Direction (No. 58-4846). Following the formula of their earlier hit, "Time Has Come Today" with its longer album version and the shorter single version, "Love Peace And Happiness" did the same.

Even though the credited composer on the US Columbia single is The Chambers Brothers, the composers are George Chambers, Joseph Chambers, Lester Chambers and Willie Chambers.

== Reception ==
The single was reviewed in the 7 February issue of Cash Box, where it was one of the Picks of the Week. The review was positive and it was called a "stand out side. The reviewer noted their softened vocals and gently presented lyric and mentioned the powerful rhythm that would reach the A&M and FM audiences.

It was reviewed in the 7 February issue of Billboard where it was one of the Special Merit Spotlight singles. The reviewer wrote that it was solid funky beat swinger. The lyric line was commended and the potential for pop and soul charts noted.

According to Bob Glassengerg in the Campus Programming Aids of his "What's Happening" column in Campus News (Billboard 21 Feb.), "Love, Peace and Happiness" was a BLP cut at WJRB in Virginia.

== Chart history ==
For the week of 14 February, "Love, Peace and Happiness" debuted at No. 122 in the Billboard Bubbling Under the Hot 100 chart. It debuted at No. 96 in the Billboard Hot 100 the following week, which is where it peaked.

"Love, Peace and Happiness" debuted at No. 35 in the Cash Box Looking Ahead chart for the week of 14 February. It didn't progress any further.

== Later years ==
Along with "Are You Ready", "Love, Peace and Happiness" was recorded in Las Vegas in 2016 for the Power of Peace album by The Isley Brothers and Santana.

The song was revived by Moonalice in 2022. It is included on the group's Full Moonalice Vol. 1 EP. In addition to Lester and Dylan Chambers, the musicians include, Pete Sears on bass, Barry Sless on guitar, John Molo on drums, Jason Crosby on keyboard, and Roger McNamee on guitar.

== Referenced ==
In Dewey Starbuck's Secret of the Skulls: Eyes of Time, Volume 2, the song was referred to as having cool words and great rhythm.

The song is commonly interpolated by members of the National Pan-Hellenic Council (NPHC) to express passion for their respective organizations. Most prominently, members of Alpha Phi Alpha sing the words "All of my love, my peace and happiness, I'm gonna give it to Alpha" to the popular first verse.
