= Wake Up (The Chambers Brothers song) =

Single by The Chambers Brothers

from the album Love, Peace and Happiness
- A-side: "Wake Up"
- B-side: "Everybody Needs Someone"
- Released: 1969
- Label: Columbia 4-44890
- Composer: -M. Hamlisch - J. Hirschhorn
- Producer: David Rubinson

US singles chronology
"Are You Ready" (1969)	"Wake Up" (1969)	"Just a Closer Walk with Thee" (1969)

"Wake Up" is a 1969 single by The Chambers Brothers. The song was used in the 1969 film The April Fools. It was also a chart hit for them that year.

== Background ==
"Wake Up" was written by Marvin Hamlisch and Joel Hirschhorn. Working with producer David Rubinson, the Chambers Brothers recorded it. Backed with "Everybody Needs Someone" which was written by Julius Chambers, it was released as a single on Columbia 4-44890 in 1969.

According to music reviewer Penny Valentine, the brass intro to the song reminded her of "Turn On Your Lovelight". "Wake Up" appears in the film The April Fools which starred Catherine Deneuve and Jack Lemmon.

== Reception ==
The song had a positive review in the 7 June issue of Cash Box where it was a Pick of the Week. The reviewer wrote that with the immediate radio impact potential and the coverage in the film, The April Fools, it could be one of the group's biggest hits.

The single was also reviewed in the 7 June issue of Record World where it was a Four-Star Pick. The reviewer wrote that nobody could sleep through the rocker and it could put the brothers back on top.

The single was reviewed by Penny Valentine in the 2 August issue of Disc and Music Echo. In spite of Valentine writing that she couldn't see what all the fuss was about in the US with The Chambers Brothers, she noted the similarity between "Wake Up" and "Turn On Your Lovelight", and said that the record was "a really raving powerful record" that gave her hope for the future and might give them their first hit.

== Airplay ==
As reported in the Radio Active section of the 14 June issue of Cash Box, 11% of participating radio stations had added "Wake Up" to their program schedules over the past week. Also that week, it was reported in the Money Music section of Record World that "Wake Up" was on at WFUN, WMPS, KIMN and WDRC.

As shown in the Primary Radio Exposure chart of the 26 July issue of Record World, "Wake Up" was at No. 50 at WIXY in Cleveland, No. 23 at CXLW in Detroit, No. 22 at WKLR in Detroit and No. 25 at KAFY in Bakersfield.

== Charts ==
=== US ===
The single debuted at No. 2 in the Cash Box Looking Ahead chart for the week of 21 June 1969. It reached the No. 1 position for the week of 5 July.

"Wake Up" debuted at No. 25 on the Record World Singles Coming Up chart for the week of 21 June. The following week (28 June), it was at No. 1. It was still at No. 1 for the week of 5 July. It dropped down to No. 2 the following week. It was still in the chart at No. 46 for the week of 26 July.

The single debuted at no. 92 on the Billboard Hot 100 singles chart for the week of 12 July 1969. Its peak position was also No. 92. It stayed in the chart for one more week.

=== UK ===
"Wake Up" debuted at No. 20 in the Record Mirror R&B Singles chart for the week of 23 August. The single peaked at No. 12 for the week of 6 September, and was still in the chart for the week of 13 September.
