= Joe Chambers (singer) =

American musician (1942–2024)

- Born: Joseph Lamar Chambers; 22 August 1942; Scott County, Mississippi, U.S.
- Died: 15 August 2024 (aged 81) Los Angeles, California, U.S.
- Genres: Blues; gospel; rock; soul
- Occupations: Musician; hairdresser
- Instruments: Guitar; vocals
- Years active: 1960s–2020s
- Formerly of: The Chambers Brothers; The Chambers Brothers Band; The Joe Chambers Experience; Ash Grove Alumni

Joe Chambers aka Joseph Chambers (22 August 1942 – 15 August 2024) was a singer, guitarist, songwriter and arranger. He was also a member of the 1960s group, the Chambers Brothers. The songs he wrote or co-wrote include, "Don't Lose Your Cool", the 1960s psychedelic soul song; "Time Has Come Today", "A New Time, A New Day", "Love, Peace and Happiness", and others.

== Background ==
Joseph Lamar Chambers was born on 22 August 1942 in his grandmother's house in Scott County, Mississippi. He was the youngest of the sons. His family was a sharecropping family. He was one of eight boys. He also had five sisters. He was eight years old when the family moved to Dolittle, Leake County, near the city of Carthage.

There was music in the house. His brothers Major and Willie both played the guitar. It was around 1965 that he became more interested in playing the guitar.

Joe, Willie, Lester, George Chambers, along with drummer Brian Keenan made up The Chambers Brothers. There were however earlier drummers who were with the brothers for short times. They were Mike Konnic and Jesse "Nicky" Cahn.

According to Ebony magazine, nobody in The Chambers Brothers line up was under six feet tall. Brian the drummer was six foot tall. Willie was six-foot-two, George and Lester were six-foot-three and Joe was six-foot-five tall.

With brother Willie, Joe wrote "Time Has Come Today", which according to Rock Song Index: The 7500 Most Important Songs for the Rock and Roll Era by Bruce Pollock is one of the most enduring '60s chants. It is Joe Chambers' lead vocal that is heard on the song.

In later years he was fronting his band in Los Angeles, The Joe Chambers Experience. He also worked with Marva Holiday and recorded "To Love Somebody" which was released in 2019.

== Career ==
=== 1960s ===
It was in part due to Joe Chambers that the Chambers Brothers got their start at the Ash Grove. Joe was a hairdresser, and he was straightening Lightnin' Hopkins' hair. Then they got talking to the club's owner Ed Pearl who the brothers a chance.

The Chambers Brothers had been signed to the Vault record label since 1965. Joe and Willie composed "Call Me" which was produced by Cliff Goldsmith. Backed with Joe's composition, "Seventeen", it was released in the US on Vault V-920 in 1965. It had a UK release on Vocalion 9276. "Call Me" was performed on Hollywood a Go Go on 26 June 1965. His composition, "Don't Lose Your Cool" was also performed on the same show.

Joe Chambers composed the song "It's Groovin' Time" which appeared on the 1967 album Now. However, the song was credited to C. Perry.

=== "Time Has Come Today" ===
According to brother Willie, Joe went to see Timothy Leary at ULCA and that inspired him to write "Time Has Come Today". Most of the writing was by Joe, while Willie's contribution was more on the instrumentation side. And the line, "My soul has been psychedelicized" is from Willie. It was a hit and peaked at no. 11 on the Record World 100 Top Pops chart for the week of 28 September, No. 11 on the Billboard Hot 100 in the fall of 1968, and no. 9 on the RPM 100 in Canada..

The song became an era defining song and was used in a multitude of movies and television shows. It was also used in commercials.

=== Further activities ===
In July 1968, The Chambers Brothers appeared on Playboy After Dark. With Joe Chambers on lead vocals, the group performed "I Wish It Would Rain".

By October 1968, the album A New Time – A New Day was out. It included the song "A New Time, A New Day" that he co-wrote with Brian Keenan. Joe Chambers sang lead on "Where Have All the Flowers Gone?", "I Wish It Would Rain", and "Rock Me Mama".

In March 1969, the group was set to play at the University of Massachusetts at a time when there were demonstrations and protests. Just as the group was about to go on stage, the local police to their manager of a bomb threat. They were given the option of playing or informing the audience of 3500 about the bomb and have the audience evacuate the venue. Joe Chambers went on stage and asked the puzzled crowd if they wanted to see them perform. They were met with a roar of approval by the audience and began to play. Afterwards the police informed the group that the threat was false and no bomb had been located.

In late 1969, the album Love, Peace and Happiness had been released. It was reviewed in the 6 December issue of Record World where the reviewer called it sizzling music.

=== 1970s ===
The song, "Love Peace and Happiness" that he co-wrote with his brothers, was released as a single. It was one of the five Cash Box Picks of the Week for the week of 7 February 1970. It was referred to as a stand out side. It was at no. 35 in the Cash Box Looking Ahead chart for the week of 14 February. It made no. 96 on the Billboard Hot 100 for the week of 28 February.

By 1970, the Chambers Brothers had recorded three albums for Columbia, The Time Has Come, A New Time – A New Day, and Love, Peace and Happiness. According to Charles LaMarr, the group's manager, the band wasn't satisfied with their three previous albums. Joe Chambers said that the producers assigned to them weren't willing to listen to their ideas as well as how the band should be presented. He said that they had worked very hard and didn't now want to risk their sound. Joe also said that they wanted to produce other acts and he believed that Brooklyn Bridge was one that they would produce. He also said that this was their time. The band had been experimenting with new instruments. They had played with 22 -piece orchestra at Carnegie Hall. In a 31 October 1970 article by Billboard, Joe Chambers said that he could see their future working with a large band. The Chambers Brothers produced their New Generation album that was released in 1971. Joe and Brian Keenan arranged the orchestrations on the record.

The Chambers Brothers performed at Mills College on Tuesday 28 September 1971. After performing "Funky" from the New Generation album, Joe performed "When the Evening Comes", which was described by the Oakland Tribune as a beautiful ballad that had a magnetic effect on the crowd. The group had performed the song earlier that year on 12 February at Fillmore East in New York.

Joe and Brother Willie were backing vocalists on the song "Haunted House", which is from Lee Oskar's 1978 Before the Rain album.

=== 1980s ===
Joe Chambers appeared in the Angry Samoans' video of "The Time Has Come Today" as the President. In the scene, the lead singer of The Angry Samoans is about to push the nuclear button which would destroy the world. However, the president chooses life.

In 1984, Joe was part of a group called the Chambers Brothers Band which featured himself, Willie Chambers, Chris Chambers, Duke Williams, Corey Spags and Cotton Kent. Group members, Williams, Kent and Spags (aka Corey Spagnolo) were from the group, Duke Williams and The Extremes. Three songs were recorded at Rusk Studios. They were "Here We Go", "Let's Get Funky" and "You Are My Life". "Lets Get Funky", which was apparently released on the Vogue label in Europe, was heard live on a show at RFM in Paris in 1984. The group also released a four-track 12" EP The Chambers Brothers Are Back in 1985, that had the songs, "I've Been Lovin' You Too Long", "Rainin' in My Heart", "Body Work Part 1" and "Body Work Part 2".

Both Joe and Willie were backing vocalists on Maria Vidal's self-titled album that was released in 1987.

=== 1990s ===
In 1994, Joe was playing in a version of The Chambers Brothers which consisted of himself, brothers Willie and George, another guitarist, George's son on drums and the son of one of his sisters on bass. They were playing in Seattle, Portland and Eugene, as well as San Jose and San Francisco.

Joe Chambers, Willie Chambers, and Pops Chambers provided backing vocals on Maria Muldaur's Southland of the Heart album which was released in 1998.

Along with Willie and George Chambers, Joe lent his backing vocals to "You Give Me Love" and "Dreams to Remember" which appear on Lester Chambers' 1999 self-titled album.

=== 2000s - 2020s ===
Joe, Willie, Lester and George sang backup on the Delgado Brothers song "If the World" which is on their Learn to Fly album that was released in 2009.

Both Joe and Willie sang back up on Australian singer Jessie Sparks' song "Calendar Years" which was from her Calendar Years self-titled 2012 EP. Also that year, the Carlos Marques-Marcet directed Western (short film), The Yellow Ribbon was released. Joe Chambers had a part in the film as Barry, the narrator. He also sang the song "The Yellow Ribbon".

Joe and his band The Experience were appearing at Harold's Place on Pacific Ave., San Pedro on 17 Jan 2015.

In Late 2019, a collaboration between Chambers and Marva Holiday, "To Love Somebody" was released.

Chambers along with Steve Moos and Wendy Waldman was a member of a member of the Ash Grove Alumni band. In a 2021 event that was related to former prisoner, Gary Tyler, that also featured former M*A*S*H star, Mike Farrell taking about the moral depravity of the death penalty, Joe Chambers and the Ash Grove Alumni played two sets, finishing off with "Time Has Come Today". Joe Chambers and Wendy Waldman with the Ash Gove Alumni were appearing at the Logan House at the Beatrice Wood Center for the Arts on 4 March 2023.

In 2024, Joe and Willie were awarded the Best of the West Award for their musical contribution.

The Ash Grove Alumni featuring Joe Chambers and Wendy Waldman were booked to appear at Logan House at the Beatrice Wood Center for the Arts on 1 June 2024. Unfortunately due to undisclosed circumstances, the event was postponed.

== Death ==
Joe Chambers died on 15 August 2024. His brother Lester announced the news on social media. Joe was actually looking forward to the Ash Grove Alumni show which would have been one day after his 82nd birthday. However, he died before it could happen. So, the show was changed to a tribute.

== Further reading, listening ==
- NAMM - Interview with Joe Chambers 3 March, 2020
- Lou Morheim channel, Premiered Sep 1, 2024 - Best of the West Artist Award 2024 "The Chambers Brothers" (Joe and Willie Chambers) (video)
