= Stephen Rowe (musician) =

- Born: Broken Hill, Australia
- Genres: Country music
- Instruments: Vocals, guitar

Stephen Rowe is an Australian country singer from Broken Hill, NSW, Australia. Australian Country Superstar Tania Kernaghan has been credited with giving him his first real break.

== Background ==
Stephen Rowe grew up in Broken Hill, an outback mining town in Australia. He left school before his fifteenth birthday and entered into the family trade of carpentry. In that period, he was also a motocross racer for Suzuki and was sponsored by a local dealership. To keep fit for his motocross sport, he studied boxing training for four years. He also entered into ballet and had a sixteen years career as a ballet dancer, beginning with Western Australian Ballet Company and later, the Queensland Ballet Company. He moved to the United States in 1983 and continued his ballet career in the Milwaukee Ballet, the Cincinnati Ballet, the Metropolitan Opera Ballet, and the Houston Ballet. He later started painting. In Huston, and now with an interest in music, he began writing his own songs.

He is also a professional actor and artist.

== Career ==
With Tania Kernaghan, he recorded "Let’s Fall in Love Again". The song was a hit and was the number 8 Most Added Song to Australian Radio, even passing artists such as Gwen Stefani, the Eagles and John Fogerty on the same week. The song made its debut at no. 3 on the Music Network Country Airplay Chart and was in the Top Ten for over three months.

By Late 2008, his second album, Restless Soul had been released.

A recent album of his features Willie Chambers of The Chambers Brothers fame.
