= Let's Do It (Do It Together) =

Song by The Chambers Brothers

from the album Love, Peace and Happiness
- A-side: "Let's Do It (Do It Together)"
- B-side: "To Love Somebody"
- Released: April 1970
- Label: Columbia 4S-45146
- Composer: S. Turner
- Lyricist: David Rubinson

US chronology
"Love, Peace and Happiness" (1970)	"Let's Do It (Do It Together)" (1970)	"Funky" (1970)

"Let's Do It (Do It Together)" is a 1970 single by the Chambers Brothers. It registered in multiple charts that year.

== Background ==
"Let's Do It (Do It Together)" was released on Columbia 4S-45146 in 1970. It is included on the group's Love, Peace and Happiness album.

The song was included in the That Driving Beat show, Episode 267 on 20 June 2023 and two years later Episode 386: "Take Your Shoes Off" on 09 December 2025.

== Reception ==
"Let's Do It (Do It Together)" received a positive review in the 25 April issue of Record World. The reviewer wrote that the frantic chant scream-beat of the song had re-established them as America's finest rhythm band.

"Are You Ready?" by Pacific Gas & Electric Co. and "Drop Down Mama" by Tom Rush, "Let's Do It (Do It Together)" were in the ''Billboard Labels' Disk Action Report for the week of 2 May. They were selected by Columbia as having the greatest potential for chart activity in the coming weeks. It was also one of the eleven Spotlight singles that were predicted to reach the Soul Singles Chart..

Years later, along with "If You Want Me To", "Love, Peace and Happiness", "Let’s Do It (Do It Together)" selected for mention by the Crazy on Classic Rock reviewer.

== Charts ==
=== Billboard ===
"Let's Do It (Do It Together)" debuted at No. 123 in the Billboard Bubbling Under Hot 100 chart for the week of 30 May 1970. It eventually peaked at No. 103.

=== Cash Box ===
The single debuted at No. No. 12 in the Cash Box Looking Ahead chart for the week of 18 July 1970. It peaked at No. 8 for the week of 1 August. It was still in the chart for the week of 15 August.

=== Record World ===
"Let's Do It" debuted at No. 7 in the Record World Singles Coming Up chart for the week of 1 August. It held that position until the week of 15 August. It was still in the chart for the week of 10 October.
