= Funky (The Chambers Brothers song) =

Single by The Chambers Brothers

from the album New Generation
- A-side: "Funky"
- B-side: "Love Peace and Happiness"
- Released: November 11, 1970
- Length: 2:48
- Label: Columbia 4-45277
- Composer: Lester Chambers
- Producer: The Chambers Brothers

US singles chronology
"Let's Do It (Do It Together)" (1970)	"Funky" (1970)	"New Generation" (1971)

"Funky" was a 1970 single for the Chambers Brothers. It was a hit for the group the following year where it registered on multiple charts.

== Background ==
"Funky" is a dancing song, and the scene is set at home. Mama is in the kitchen doing some cooking. With all the dancing songs that were around at the time, the composer Lester Chambers wanted to make a happy song about what went on in the home.

"Funky" was produced by the Chambers Brothers. Backed with "Love Peace and Happiness", it was released on Columbia 45277. The publisher was Chambro BMI. A Record World advertisement in mid-January 1971, alerted readers that the song from the group's forthcoming New Generation album, was now out.

A sample of "Funky" is used for "I Left My Wallet in El Segundo" by A Tribe Called Quest.

== Reception ==
As per the 12 December 1970 issue of Billboard, "Funky" was a Spotlight single, one that was predicted to reach the Soul Singles chart.

In Ed Och's Soul Sauce column in Billboard for the week of 16 January 1971, he advised the readers to check out "Funky" by The Chambers Bros. and that it was a soul hit for them.

== Airplay ==
For the week of 20 February, "Funky" was added to the playlist of WKWK in Wheeling, W. V. The album version of the song was on the playlist of KADI-FM in St. Louis for the week of 27 February.

== Charts ==
For the week of 19 December 1970, "Funky" made its debut at no. 125 in the Billboard Bubbling Under the Hot 100 chart. For the week of 30 January 1971, "Funky" debuted at no. 42 in the Billboard Best Selling Soul Singles chart. It was also a Star Performer. It held that position for another week. Funky got to no. 106 on the Billboard Bubbling Under the Hot 100 chart for the week of 20 February 1971.

For the week of 16 January 1971, "Funky" debuted at no. 55 in the Cash Box Top 60 in R&B Locations chart. For the week of 6 February, "Funky" was at no. 11 in the Cash Box Looking Ahead chart. It peaked at no. 30 on the Cash Box Top 60 In R&B Locations chart for the week of 13 February. "Funky" got to no. 2 on the Cash Box Looking Ahead chart for the week of 20 February, and the following week, it debuted at no. 96 in the Cash Box Top 100 chart. The following week (6 March), it had fallen back to no 11 in the Cash Box Looking Ahead chart.

The single debuted at no. 58 in the Record World R&B Singles Chart for the week of 16 January 1971. "Funky" debuted at no 149 in the Record World 101 - 150 Singles chart for the week of 30 January. It peaked at no. 32 on the Record World R&B Singles Chart for the week of 20 February. For the week of 27 February, "Funky" was at no. 113 on the Record World 101 - 150 Singles chart.
