= Songfacts =

Music-oriented website

- Website type: Song database
- Headquarters: Hartford, Connecticut
- Founder: Carl Wiser
- Employees: 13
- Website: songfacts.com
- Registration: Optional
- Launched: 1999
- Current status: Active
- OCLC number: 892018719

Songfacts is a music-oriented website that features articles about songs, detailing the meaning behind the lyrics, how and when they were recorded, and any other available information.

The journalists who work for the site have interviewed thousands of artists and songwriters to uncover the facts behind the songs, including Peter Murphy, Gene Simmons, Mick Jones, Ian Anderson, Brad Arnold, Billy Steinberg, Matt Thiessen, Tomas Haake, Jo Dee Messina, Marc Roberge, Bill Withers, Janis Ian, Emily Saliers, and Willie Chambers.

The site was started by WHCN DJ Carl Wiser in Hartford, Connecticut, in August 1999. Wiser originally created the list as a database to prepare for his radio programs but later posted it online. It was initially used mainly by DJs, but in 2002 it was chosen as a "Yahoo! Pick".

The August 2004 issue of Men's Journal listed Songfacts as one of the "100 Best Websites for Guys". USA Weekend has praised it as "a virtual Behind the Music."
