= Ole Frimer =

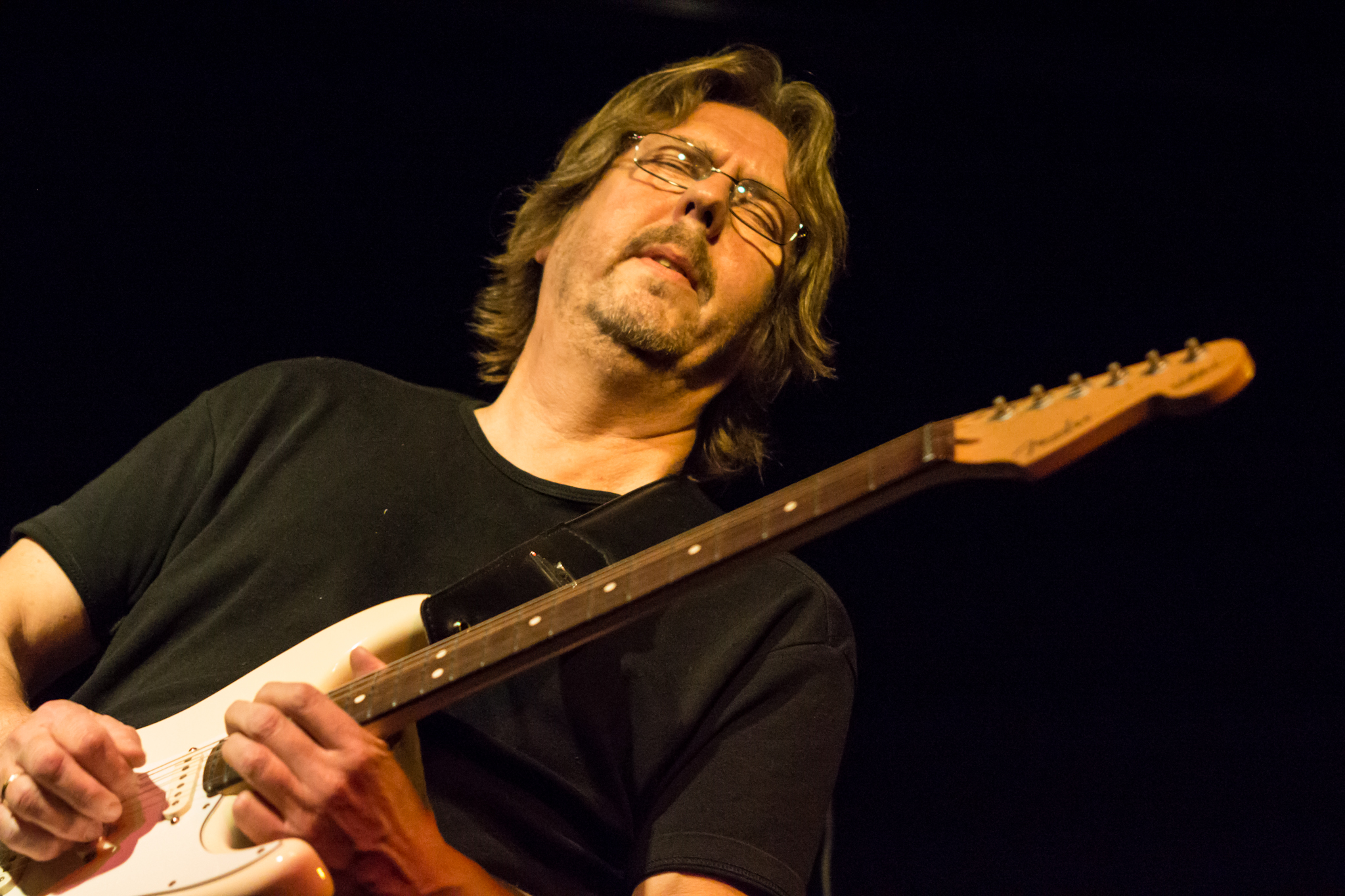
- Ole Frimer in Aarhus, Denmark 2012. (Photo: Michael B. Nielsen).

Background information
- Born: 3 November 1952 (age 72); Aalborg, Denmark
- Genres: Blues; blues rock; roots
- Occupations: Guitarist; singer; songwriter
- Instruments: Guitar; vocals
- Years active: 1968–present
- Labels: Olufsen Records; Intermusic; InTheHouse Records; LongLife Records; Katti Records
- Website: olefrimer.dk

Ole Erik Frimer (born November 3, 1952) is a Danish blues guitarist, singer and songwriter.

== Early life ==
Ole Frimer was born on 3 November 1952 in Aalborg, Denmark to Ingrid and Erik Frimer. Aged 13 he bought an acoustic guitar and began learning to play it by watching bands playing at his school, and by listening to records by mainly British pop bands and various blues artists. Aged 15 he formed a 4-piece blues band with schoolboys in his neighborhood, and in 1968 he joined a local semi-professional soul band as a bass player. As a 20 year old he went to study biology at the University of Aarhus, Denmark. Alongside his studies, he was soon absorbed into the Aarhus music scene and played in various blues and roots contexts, including the Danish guitarist and singer Peter Thorup, with whom he later came to work closely. After several years of performance with these bands in Scandinavia, and having finished his studies, Frimer chose to follow his own path.

== Career ==
=== Frimer Band (1989-1999) ===
In 1989, he formed a blues quartet called Frimer Band and began to compose. Frimer Band made their record debut in 1990 with the live album Blues Uncovered, which boosted his career. But soon after the release, Frimer moved to Greenland, when he was offered a position as scientific director of Copenhagen University's Arctic Station in Qeqertarsuaq. He stayed in Greenland in the period 1990-1993. After returning, he completed a doctoral thesis on his work in Greenland, and obtained the Ph.D. degree in biology in Copenhagen in 1994. Then he resumed his music career and recorded the following years three albums with Frimer Band with changing members, but with bass player Jørgen Nielsen as a solid anchor man.

=== Blue Junction (1996-2009) ===
In 1996, he initiated a collaboration with guitar player Uffe Steen, bass player Morten Brauner and drummer Esben Bach (later replaced by drummer Claus Daugaard) and formed the quartet Blue Junction. The band was noticed even outside blues circles and internationally. Blue Junction recorded four albums, a DVD and a few singles, and received two American Real Blues Awards for Best Live European Blues Recording and Best European Blues Act. Their last album, Live Out Of Love, received a Danish Music Award (Grammy) for Best Danish Blues Album 2007. Blue Junction dissolved in 2009.

=== Peter Thorup & Ole Frimer (2001-2007) ===
In 2001, Frimer formed a duo with his friend and colleague for 17 years, blues musician and producer Peter Thorup. They released the single "Glade Jul" ("Silent Night") and a live album, På Stedet, and toured extensively in Denmark, Germany, Poland and Greenland until Thorup's sudden death in 2007.

=== Varna ===
Ole Frimer has toured a lot in Greenland over the years. He and his bandmates introduced blues music to Greenlandic musicians during several workshops and concerts. At a festival in Nuuk, Greenland, Frimer met the Greenlandic singer and songwriter Varna. Frimer urged Varna and her producer and bass player Jorsi Sørensen to come to Aarhus to record her songs. In 2006 Varna, Jorsi, Frimer, keyboard player Claus Sand and drummer Claus Daugaard recorded Varna's debut album I Wish in Aarhus and released it in Greenland and Denmark in 2007. Varna received Koda's Talent Pris (Talent Award) for I Wish the same year.

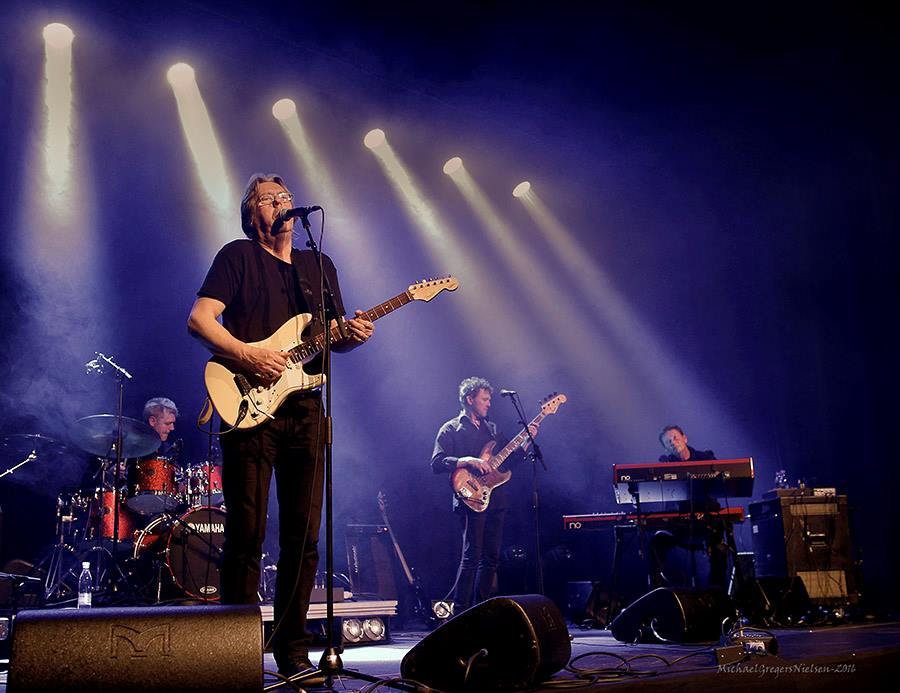
Ole Frimer Band in Frederikshavn, Denmark 2016. (Photo: Michael Gregers Nielsen).

=== Ole Frimer Band (2010-present) ===
In 2008, Frimer began to work on a new edition of Frimer Band. By 2010, the band was ready to kick off with bass player Jesper Bylling, keyboard player Palle Hjorth and drummer Claus Daugaard. Ole Frimer Band released their first album, Blålys, in 2014, which received wide media coverage in Scandinavia and was nominated for a Danish Music Award in the category Danish Blues Album Of The Year. In 2015, they released Live At Blues Baltica, recorded at the Blues Baltica festival in Eutin, Germany. The album, received glowing reviews from most of Europe and in the United States. Live At Blues Baltica was also nominated for a Danish Music Award for Best Danish Blues Album Of The Year. In 2019, Palle Hjorth was replaced by keyboard player Niels Ole Thorning. In January 2020 Ole Frimer Band put out the studio album Faerd, and in August 2020 they released the album Live in Eppingen on the German label Katti Records. The latter was nominated for a Danish Music Award for Best Danish Blues Album Of The Year.

== Awards ==
year	award	category
2001	7th Annual Real Blues Awards	Best Live European Blues Recording
2004	10th Annual Real Blues Awards	Best European Blues Act
2008	Danish Music Awards	Best Danish Blues Album
2011	Bank Nordik Honorary Award	Achievements on the Danish and international music scenes
2021	Bluesnight Award	Outstanding effort for Danish blues music

== Technique and influence ==
Frimer stopped use of a pick (plectrum) in the early 1980s. He plays an unorthodox finger picking and strumming technique influenced mainly by Jim Messina, Albert Collins and Jeff Beck. Frimer plays primarily Fender Telecaster and Fender Stratocaster through a 60W Fender Super Amp. He uses a handmade "Zornig Klon" fuzz pedal designed for Frimer by Jan Zornig Andersen.
Ole Frimer cites also Johnny Winter, B. B. King, Albert King, Wilson Picket, Otis Redding, Sam and Dave, The Eagles, Phoebe Snow and Ry Cooder as main sources.

== Discography ==
=== Frimer Band ===
- 1990 Blues Uncovered
- 1995 Handmade
- 1997 Sheltered Roads
- 1999 Second live

=== Blue Junction ===
- 1998 22:17 Live In Aarhus
- 2002 Diamond On A Dump
- 2004 The Journey
- 2005 Dating (DVD/dual disc)
- 2005 En Gydehistorie (single)
- 2006 Net Date (single)
- 2007 Live Out Of Love
- 2007 Black Magic Woman (single)

=== Peter Thorup & Ole Frimer ===
- 2005 Glade Jul (single)
- 2006 På Stedet

=== Varna ===
- 2007 I Wish

=== Ole Frimer Band ===
- 2014 Blålys
- 2015 Live At Blues Baltica
- 2020 Faerd
- 2020 Live in Eppingen
