= Willie Chambers =

American musician (born 1938)

- Born: Willie Mack Chambers; March 3, 1938 (age 88); Mississippi, U.S.
- Genres: Rock; gospel; soul; blues
- Occupations: Musician; singer
- Instruments: Vocals; guitar
- Years active: 1961–present
- Formerly of: The Chambers Brothers; the Chambers Brothers Band; the Willie Chambers Band
- Website: willie-chambers.com

Willie Chambers (born March 3, 1938) is an American singer, guitarist, and former member of the Chambers Brothers, a rock band in the 1960s with hits "Time Has Come Today", "I Can't Turn You Loose", and "Love, Peace and Happiness". He continues to be a regular attraction at various venues in Los Angeles and further afield.

== Background ==
Willie Chambers, along with brothers Lester, Joe and George, was a founding member of The Chambers Brothers and stayed with them through their evolution which included drummers, Mike Konnic, and Jesse "Nicky" Cahn, then settling on drummer Brian Keenan in the mid-1960s, and through to the group's eventual breakup.

He was born into a sharecropping family in a poor part of Mississippi. There were eight brothers and five sisters in the family. Willie and his three brothers started out singing at the Mount Calvary Baptist Church in Lee County. Older Brother George who had been in the army headed to South Los Angeles after his release and later on, the three other brothers followed.

He sang lead on their cover of Wilson Pickett's "In the Midnight Hour". He also co-wrote their biggest hit "Time Has Come Today" with his brother Joe.

He would later work as a session musician.

In recent years, he has become more active and has collaborated with artists such as Louis Metoyer. He has also been involved with Australian born artists such as Jessie Sparks and singer Stephen Rowe, appearing in his "Restless Soul" video.

He had a business relationship with publicist Beverly Noga, who, in the past had represented Sonny & Cher, Cream, the Bee Gees and The Chambers Brothers. After her company which she founded in 1964, Contemporary Public Relations closed down, she and Willie Chambers formed Hebewillen Enterprises and Hebewillen Publishing, which ran until her death in 2021.

== Career ==
=== 1960s ===
In 1962 Willie Chambers had teamed up with Luke "Long Gone" Miles. During that year and the following year, Chambers had regular performances with Miles at San Francisco's Sugar Hill club and at the Ash Grove. He also played guitar on Miles' Country Born album that was released in 1964. The album was reviewed in the 17 December 1964 issue of Down Beat. In noting the similarity between Miles and Lightnin' Hopkins, the reviewer also wrote that Willie Chambers "re-creates the Hopkins’ guitar style to complete the illusion".

During the 1960s, The Chambers Brothers performed with Barbara Dane. Willie was worried about himself and his brothers performing political songs with Dane. Years later he said "You can’t do music and politics. It’s like gasoline and water. It doesn’t mix.".

By 1965, The Chambers Brothers had signed with the Vault record label. With brother Joe, Willie composed "Call Me" which was produced by Cliff Goldsmith. Backed with Joe's composition, "Seventeen", it was released in the US on Vault V-920 in 1965, and in the UK on Vocalion 9276. Years later, it was described by Way Back Attack as a "raw and rockin' soul tune...with a prominent cowbell beat!". The group performed the song as well as "Don't Lose Your Cool" on Hollywood a Go Go on 26 June 1965. In an interview on 20 January 2020, Willie and Joe talked about "Call Me" and how it got played on a radio station, one they remembered being KRLA that had the Rocket to Stardom show. They said that their song was opposite to what the station was usually playing. "Call Me" was a "Record of the Week there". The UK release on Vocalion had a brief review in the 30 July 1966 issue of Record Mirror, where the reviewer said that they managed a few interesting gimmicks on the song.

==== "Time Has Come Today" ====
The group's album The Time Has Come was out by late 1967. It was reviewed in the 25 November issue of Cash Box. It contained songs, "All Strung Out Over You", "People Get Ready", "I Can't Stand It", "In the Midnight Hour", "What the World Needs Now Is Love", and "Time Has Come Today". One of the songs, "In the Midnight Hour", was performed by the Chambers Brothers to an audience of 3,000 at the Newport Festival. The version on the album was sung by Willie. The lead singer on "Time Has Come Today" was Joe Chambers.Even though Jim Beviglia of American Songwriter credits George Chambers as the singer on the song", he is correct that Joe did most of the writing and Willie's contribution was more in the instrumentation. The line, "My soul has been psychedelicized" is from Willie.

==== Further activities ====
Willie composed the song "There She Goes" which was included on the Shout! which was released on the Vault label in 1968. According to the Liner Notes website by Richie Unterberger the song was "bouncy R&B/rock, complete with harmonica, that sounded almost like it could have been filler for an early Rolling Stones LP".

In October 1968, the Chambers Brothers' album, A New Time – A New Day was released. It was reviewed in the 12 October issue of Record World. It contained the songs, "A New Time – A New Day", "I Can't Turn You Loose", "Guess Who", "Where Have All the Flowers Gone?", "Love is All I Have", "You Got the Power - To Turn Me On" and "No, No, No, Don't Say Good-By". The last two songs were composed by Willie.

==== "Love is All I Have", "You Got the Power" ====
Willie also sang lead on "Love is All I Have", and "You Got the Power - To Turn Me On".

Alexis Korner and Peter Thorup would perform "You Got the Power" live in 1973 which appeared on their album. Thorup and Ole Frimer would record a version which appeared on their 2016 "På Stedet album. Danish band, The Blues Overdrive would perform the song in 2018.

==== Further activities ====
The Chambers Brothers were in Copenhagen in 1969; Willie had a long-distance phone conversation with Ian Middleton of UK music trade magazine Record Mirror about the kind of music the Chambers brothers were playing and was asked about the spate of reissues of the group's material. Chambers told of how the audiences were receiving them, and how the band didn't consider themselves as an underground group, but how the FM stations helped their records break through.

=== 1970s - 1980s ===
The Chambers Brothers recorded the Live in Concert on Mars, which was released on Roxbury RLX 106 in 1976. The album also featured Steve Cropper on guitar. The album was reviewed in the 23 October 1976 issue of Cash Box. Willie's singing on the song "Superstar" was referred to as a gem with the reviewer also saying that 7:37 wouldn't be too long for progressive airplay.

Willie and brother Joe provided backing vocals on "Haunted House", a track on the Before The Rain album by Lee Oskar, released in 1978.

In 1984, he was part of a group called the Chambers Brothers Band which featured himself, Joe Chambers, Chris Chambers, Duke Williams, Corey Spags and Cotton Kent. Group members, Williams, Kent and Spags (aka Corey Spagnolo) were from the group, Duke Williams and The Extremes. They recorded three songs at Rusk Studios. They were "Here We Go", "Let's Get Funky" and "You Are My Life". "Lets Get Funky", which was apparently released on the Vogue label in Europe, was heard live on a show at RFM in Paris in 1984. They also released a four-track 12" EP The Chambers Brothers Are Back in 1985, that had the songs, "Ive Been Lovin' You Too Long", "Rainin' in My Heart", "Body Work Part 1" and "Body Work Part 2".

=== 1990s ===
Chambers added his vocals to a track on Kid Ramos' self-titled album. Mike Boehm of Los Angeles Times gave a review in September 1999. He noted Chambers' input to the song "Leave Me Alone", describing it as "piercing, full-on cries in the role of a man caged in a romance he doesn’t want".

Towards the late 1990s, Willie was fronting his Willie Chambers Band. He was the only member from the Chambers Brothers that was in it. According to the 30 October 1997 article "In It for the Long Haul" in the Los Angeles Times by Bill Locey, Chambers' son and Nephew were also in the band. They had recorded a demo or original songs and were looking around for a record deal. Apparently, there were some interested parties. They were to make their debut in Ventura, California at Nicholby's on Saturday, 1 November 1997.

=== 2000s ===
In 2005, he sang lead on "I Move Easy" which was written by T. J. Tindall and featured Tindal, Earl Scooter on background vocals. The rhythm section featured Earl Young, Ronnie Baker and Larry Washington from MFSB.

In 2006, he sat in with a group called Vince and the Invinceables at a benefit concert for Arthur Lee of the group Love.

Between 2008 and 2009, he was involved with the Artie Vegas Revue.

He and his brother Joe Chambers worked with Australian singer Jessie Sparks. They contributed to the song "Calendar Years" which was featured on her 2012 EP. The song was described as a funky piece with a soulful vocal.

=== 2010s ===
Chambers recorded the single, "Taxi Hey" which was released on Angel Tongue Records in 2011.

==== Collaboration with Louis Metoyer ====
In September 2015, Chambers and Louis Metoyer were scheduled to appear at Pickwick Gardens, Ronnie Mack's Salute to Tina Turner event. In addition to Chambers and Metoyer working on various projects such as appearing at the Pickwick Gardens Turner event and performing with the Madero Sisters, they recorded "Get Out And Vote!!!" which was released in 2018.

==== Further activities ====
Willie was interviewed by Jeff Suwak of Songfacts where he talked about his early years in Mississippi and the career of The Chambers Brothers which was published on the website on January 3, 2018.

On Saturday 12 October 2019, Willie's brother George died at age 88. Willie wrote on his Facebook page on Sunday that George was "The best big brother you could ever have".

=== 2020s ===
Chambers had worked with group Trans-X and worked on two dance collaborations, "She Freaks out on the Floor" in 2018 and "Keep it Coming" in 2020.

On October 17, 2022, Chambers and Barbara Dane who the Chambers Brothers worked with in the mid-60s performed together live on stage in Berkley singing, "Ain't Gonna Let Nobody Turn Me Around". In November, 2022 Chambers was interviewed for the Psychedelic Scene YouTube channel. It was also published on line in transcript form.

Willie Chambers was interviewed as an inductee for the California Music Hall of Fame which was published on the MediaNiteRadio YouTube channel on April 19, 2024.

On 15 August 2024, Joe Chambers died. During a memorial concert for his brother on 7 October 2024, which was organized and led by Chambers Brothers' lead guitarist Crazy Tomes, and featured many legends such as Jimmy Vivino and The Delgado Brothers, Willie Chambers was joined on stage by three of his daughters to sing "Stand By Me".

Willie Chambers is one of the artists who was set to perform at the Veterans National Telethon festival on 7 June 2025.

== Discography (selective) ==
Singles
| Act | Title | Album | Catalogue | Year | Notes # |
|---|---|---|---|---|---|
| Willie Chambers | "Taxi Hey" | | Angel Tongue Records | 2011 | |
| Crazy Tomes, Guitar Shorty, Willie Chambers | "Back to the Motherland" | | | 2015 | |
| Louis Metoyer feat Willie Chambers | "Get Out And Vote!!!" | | | 2018 | |
| Trans-X | "She Freaks out on the Floor" | Discolocos, Vol. 1 (Original Motion Picture Soundtrack) | | 2018 | |
| Trans-X | "Keep it Coming" | iscolocos, Vol. 3 (Original Motion Picture Soundtrack) | | 2020 | |

Appearances (selective)
| Act | Title | Album | Catalogue | Year | Notes # |
|---|---|---|---|---|---|
| Luke "Long Gone" Miles | Various tracks: Willie Chambers - guitar | Country Born | World Pacific 1820 | 1964 | |
| Lee Oskar | "Haunted House" | Before The Rain | Elektra 6E-150 | 1978 | Backing: Willie, Joe and George |
| Maria Vidal | "Life On The Train" | Maria Vidal | A&M Records SP 6-5160 | 1987 | Backing: Willie and Joe |
| Kid Ramos | "Leave Me Alone" | Kid Ramos | Evidence ECD 26104-2 | 1999 | Willie Chambers vocal |
| Paul Revere & The Raiders | "Time Has Come Today" | Ride To The Wall Volume II | Ride To The Wall Foundation RTTWF 2005 | 2005 | Vocal Willie Chambers |
| Various | "Me and the Devil" | Gospel, The Ultimate Collection | The Red Box THERB432 | 2007 | Featuring Willie Chambers |
| Stephen Rowe | "Restless Soul" | Restless Soul (Album) | | 2009 | Willie appears in the "Restless Soul" video |
| Jessie Sparks | "Calendar Years" | Jessie Sparks (EP) | | 2012 | Backing: Willie and Joe Chambers contribute to "Calendar Years" |
| Fuzzbee Morse | "Underground Railroad" | Dreams And Other Living Things | Giant Mogul 0001 | 2015 | Backing Vocals – Joe Chambers, Lisa Frazier, Tyra Juliette, Willie Chambers |

== Film and guest appearances ==
- Restless Soul (Video)
- The making of "Restless Soul" video
- South Central Gospel - Documentary - 2011 - Himself
