= The Time Has Come (The Chambers Brothers album) =

Studio album by the Chambers Brothers
- Released: November 1967
- Recorded: August 1, 1966 – August 10, 1967
- Length: 43:35
- Label: Columbia
- Producer: David Rubinson

The Chambers Brothers chronology
People Get Ready (1966)	The Time Has Come (1967)	A New Time – A New Day (1968)

The Time Has Come is an album by American psychedelic soul band the Chambers Brothers. Released by Columbia Records in 1967, it features their hit "Time Has Come Today".

== Critical reception ==
The album was reviewed in the 25 November 1967 issue of Cash Box where it was one of the "Pop Best Bets". The reviewer said that the group performed a group of pop songs with style and verve, and it should get the approbation of a wide listenership.

The Washington Free Press did a review on the album which appeared in the publication's 7 March 1968 issue. While the reviewer wrote that the album only hinted at the richness of the music by The Chambers Brothers, it was to give a picture of how the group was live. The songs "I Can't Stand It", "All Strung Out Over You", "Romeo and Juliet", "What the World Needs Now is Love" and "Time Has Come Today" were singled out for mention. The reviewer also said, "Listen to what they do to the fairly straight, "What the World Needs Now Is Love" (with a great and original arrangement by Gary Sherman)".

The album was referred to as a "ground-breaking album" by the authors of Shining Star: Braving the Elements of Earth, Wind & Fire. In a short review of the album, Music On Vinyl referred to it as a perfect blend of soul and garage.

According to the 5 September 2017 review by Loudersound, things began with "All Strung Out Over You" and then there was a majestic version of "People Get Ready". Much of the rest of the tracks flowed in the same pattern. But "Time Has Come Today" was described as "an 11-minute stroke of pure genius". Reviewer Malcolm Dome finished off with telling the reader that psychedelic prog and soul really can co-exist.

== Gold status ==
It was reported in the 21 December 1968 issue of Record World that the album had achieved an excess of one million dollars, as certified by the RIAA and this was the first gold record for The Chambers Brothers.

== Commercial performance ==
=== United States ===
The album had been in the Record World 100 Top LP's chart for twelve weeks when it peaked at No. 5 for the week of 9 November. It held that position for an additional two weeks. The following week, (30 November), the album had dropped down to No. 9. The album's last position was No. 68 for the week of 15 February 1969 during its twenty-six week run.

On 14 December 1968, at its 27th week on the Billboard chart, it peaked at no. 6. According to the December 21, 1968 issue of Billboard, along with Parsley, Sage, Rosemary and Thyme by Simon and Garfunkel, their album was one of the 36 Columbia albums that held a position in the top five that year. International online magazine PopMatters said the album ascended to number four on Billboard's pop albums chart.

It was no. 79 on the Cashbox Top 100 Pop Albums in 1968.

=== Canada ===
In Canada it reached no. 11.

== Track listing ==
Side one
No.	Title	Writer(s)	Length
1.	"All Strung Out Over You"	Rudy Clark	2:30
2.	"People Get Ready"	Curtis Mayfield	3:52
3.	"I Can't Stand It"	Lester Chambers	2:42
4.	"Romeo and Juliet"	Lester Chambers	4:32
5.	"In the Midnight Hour"	Steve Cropper, Wilson Pickett	5:32
6.	"So Tired"	Andre Goodwin, The Chambers Brothers	4:05

Side two
No.	Title	Writer(s)	Length
1.	"Uptown"	Betty Mabry, arranged by Garry Sherman	2:56
2.	"Please Don't Leave Me"	The Chambers Brothers	3:00
3.	"What the World Needs Now Is Love"	Burt Bacharach, Hal David, arranged by Garry Sherman	3:20
4.	"Time Has Come Today"	Joseph Chambers, Willie Chambers	11:06

== Personnel ==
The Chambers Brothers

- George Chambers – bass, vocals
- Joseph Chambers – guitars
- Lester Chambers – vocals, harmonica, percussion
- Willie Chambers – guitars
- Brian Keenan – drums, percussion

Technical

- Jim Marshall – photography

== Influence ==
Two songs from the album were recorded by Spanish group Los Crich. "All Strung Out Over You" backed with Lester Chambers' composition, "I Can't Stand It" were released on the Fonoguanche label in 1969.
