= All Strung Out Over You =

1966 song by The Chambers Brothers

Single by The Chambers Brothers

from the album The Time Has Come
- B-side: "Falling In Love"
- Released: December 19, 1966
- Recorded: 1966
- Genre: R&B
- Length: 2:20
- Label: Columbia 4-43957
- Songwriter: R. Clark
- Producer: David Rubinson

The Chambers Brothers singles chronology
"Time Has Come Today" (1966)	"All Strung Out Over You" (1966)	"I Can't Stand It" (1967)

"All Strung Out Over You" was an early hit for The Chambers Brothers. It featured Lester Chambers on lead vocals. It was sampled by Fatboy Slim on "Weapon of Choice".

== Info on the song ==
"All Strung Out Over You" is performed by The Chambers Brothers with Lester Chambers on lead vocal. It was composed by Rudy Clark. The Chambers Brothers recorded the song and it was released on Columbia 4–43957 on December 19, 1966. It was rushed out by Columbia after the label had rejected an early version of "Time Has Come Today".

It was reported by Record World in the magazine's 31 December issue that the Chambers Brothers who had a professional history ranging from church gospel singing to folk-blues, had changed their direction, and had a new Columbia single "All Strung Out Over You" bw "Falling in Love" that was aimed at the rhythm and blues market.

It became a regional hit for the group which gave them the opportunity to re-record "The Time Has Come Today".

The song appeared as the A1 track of their 1967 album The Time Has Come. Years later, along with "Into My Own Thing" by Sly & the Family Stone, the song would be sampled for the song "Weapon of Choice by Fatboy Slim which also featured Bootsy Collins.

== Reception ==
The record was a Newcomer Pick in the 24 December 1966 issue of Cash Box. The reviewer who called the record "a powerhouse of a rocker" also said that group "can’t help but excite both Top 40 and R&B fans". The terms "soul drenched swinger and "prime dance item" were also used. The flip side, "Falling in Love" was referred to as a low-down shouter.

As noted by Kal Rudman in the 18 February issue of Record World, "All Strung Over You" which was a smash in Boston was now hitting Chicago. He also said that the Chambers Brothers sound like a new Righteous Brothers.

=== Charts ===
By January 11, 1967, the song had moved from its previous position of 48 up to 34 on the WMCA chart. A full-page ad appeared in the 14 January 1967 issue of Record World alerting the reader that "All Strung Out Over You" was Breaking out all over. By the 28th of that month, Billboard had recorded the single as a regional breakout.

== Reaction to the song ==
For its cowbell effect, the song is noted at the Ultimate Cowbell Database.

== Other versions ==
Spanish group, Los Crich recorded their version of the song for the Fonoguanche label. It was backed with another Chambers Brothers song, "I Can't Stand It" which was composed by Lester Chambers.
