= A New Time – A New Day =

Studio album by the Chambers Brothers
- Released: October 1968
- Label: Columbia Records CS 9671
- Producer: Tim O'Brien

The Chambers Brothers chronology
The Time Has Come (1967)	A New Time – A New Day (1968)	Shout (1968)

A New Time – A New Day is a 1968 studio album by the Chambers Brothers. It contained their chart hit "I Can't Turn You Loose" plus the title song, "A New Time – A New Day" and covers of "Where Have All the Flowers Gone", and "I Wish It Would Rain". It did well in the US and Canadian charts.

== Background ==
A New Time – A New Day was the Chambers Brothers' second album for Columbia. The album's producer, Tim O' Brien was currently having success with a single, "Sally Had a Party" which he wrote, arranged and produced for the group Flavor. One of the songs on the album, "Satisfy You" was written by Tim O'Brien and Gary St. Clair. It was a song by Flavor, the very group that O'Brien was having current success with.

Unlike the Chambers Brothers' previous album, The Time Has Come which had the title song released as a single, this album's title song which originally ran at 7:26 wasn't released as a single.

The album was released in the US on Columbia CS 9671. A full-page ad for the album appeared on page 5 in the 5 October 1968 issue of Billboard, alerting readers that the album was shipping that week. The ad also said that the album was in 4-track and 8-track stereo tape cartridges and 4-track reel-to-reel stereo tape.

The record was released in South Africa on Date DAS 2012. The band's pictures were not shown on the cover. This may be because South African authorities didn't allow multi-racial groups to be seen. A similar example would be The Foundations who had the cover blurred on their 1967 From the Foundations album,, and their Digging the Foundations album.

== Reception ==
The album had a positive review from Record World in the magazine's 12 October 1968 issue. The reviewer noted the tight instrumentation and vital vocals, finishing off by saying that the album was something that the teens will make sure to own.

The album received a positive review in the March 1969 issue of Beat Instrumental. Even though the reviewer didn't consider the backing as solid as the vocals, the songs "I Wish It Would Rain" and "Rock Me Mama" were noted as ones that took them right back to the gospel roots. The reviewer also said that they performed it better than most.

== Charts ==
=== US ===
==== Billboard ====
For the week of 12 October 1968, the album debuted at no. #194 in the Billboard Top LP's chart. It peaked at no. 16 for the week of 12 December during its 21-week chart run.

The album made its debut at no. 48 in the Billboard Best Selling Rhythm & Blues LPs chart for the week of 2 November 1968. The group's other album, The Time Has Come was at no. 12 in the same chart, and had been in the chart for ten weeks.

==== Record World ====
The album debuted at no. 86 in the Record World 100 Top LP's chart for the week of 19 October 1968. Having been in the chart for seven weeks, the album peaked at no. 13 for the week of 30 November, and held that position until 7 December.

==== Cash Box ====
For the week of 19 October, A New Time - A New Day debuted at no. 107 in the Cash Box 101 - 140 albums chart. For the week of 26 October, the album debuted at no. 100 in the Cash Box Top 100 Albums chart. The album peaked at no. 20 on the Top 100 Albums chart for 30 November 1968.

=== Canada ===
==== RPM Weekly ====
The album debuted at no. 46 in the RPM Weekly Top 50 Albums chart for the week of 11 November. The album reached the position of no. 19 for the week of 2 December 1968.

== Track listing ==
- A1. "I Can't Turn You Loose", (Otis Redding)
- A2. "Guess Who", (Jesse Belvin, JoAnn Belvin)
- A3. "Do Your Thing", (Brian Keenan, George Chambers, Joseph Chambers, Lester Chambers, Willie Chambers)
- A4. "Where Have All the Flowers Gone", (Pete Seeger)
- A5. "Love Is All I Have", (Brian Keenan)
- A6. "You Got the Power - To Turn Me On", (Willie Chambers)
- B1. "I Wish It Would Rain", (B. Strong*, N. Whitefield*, R. Penzabene)
- B2. "Rock Me Mama", (Arr. The Chambers Brothers)
- B3. "No, No, No, Don't Say Good-By", (Willie Chambers)
- B4. "Satisfy You", (Gary St. Clair, Timothy Michael O'Brien)
- B5. "A New Time - A New Day" (Brian Keenan, Joseph Chambers)

== Later years ==
"New Time, New Day" was performed by Moonalice with Lester Chambers on vocals at an event held at Golden Gate Park in San Francisco on 18 December 2021.
