= Love, Peace and Happiness =

Live album by The Chambers Brothers

Live album by The Chambers Brothers
- Released: December 1969
- Venue: Fillmore East, New York City
- Genre: Soul
- Length: 76:56
- Label: Columbia
- Producer: Tim O'Brien, David Rubinson

The Chambers Brothers chronology
Shout! (1968)	Love, Peace and Happiness (1969)	Feelin' The Blues (1970)

Professional ratings
Review scores
Source	Rating
AllMusic	3/5 stars
Robert Christgau	C−
MusicHound Rock: The Essential Album Guide	3/5 stars
The New Rolling Stone Record Guide	1/5 stars

Love, Peace and Happiness is an album by soul artists The Chambers Brothers, released in 1969.

== Background ==
The album was released as a double-LP, half studio recordings and half live recordings. The live material was recorded at Bill Graham's Fillmore East. The release is actually two albums in a 2-LP package. The studio half is Love Peace and Happiness. The other record his Live at Bill Graham's Fillmore East.

In "Love, Peace and Happiness", the phrase "That's one small step for a man, a giant leap for mankind" is paraphrased as, "It's a small step for man, but it's a giant leap for all mankind". The song peaked at No. 96 on the Billboard Hot 100. It was covered by Carlos Santana and The Isley Brothers on 2017's Power of Peace.

== Chart performance ==
The album debuted on Billboard magazine's Top LP's chart in the issue dated December 27, 1969, peaking at No. 58 during a thirty-three-week run on the chart.

== Critical reception ==
The album was reviewed in the 6 December 1969 issue of Record World with the reviewer writing that it was sizzling music and "both halves add up to more than the sum of their parts".

AllMusic wrote that "the live sides are better, with stronger material, including 'I Can't Turn You Loose' and 'People Get Ready'." Robert Christgau, who had attended the concert at which the live side was recorded only to walk out, wrote that "now that the evidence is in I know I did the right thing," and called the album "shameful excess."

Reviewing a 2016 reissue, the Lincolnshire Echo called the album "life-enhancing," and praised the "punchy live set."

== Track listing ==
=== Love, Peace And Happiness (Studio) ===
==== A ====
1. "Have a Little Faith" (S. Turner) – 5:14
2. "Let's Do It (Do It Together)" (S. Turner) – 4:34
3. "To Love Somebody" - (B. Gibb, R. Gibb) – 4:36
4. "If You Want Me To" (S. Turner) – 3:59
5. "Wake Up" (J. Joel Hirschhorn, M. Hamlisch) – 2:18

==== B ====
1. "Love, Peace and Happiness" (The Chambers Brothers) – 16:16

=== Live At Bill Graham's Fillmore East (Live) ===
==== C ====
1. "Wade in the Water" (Traditional; arranged by Julius Chambers) – 10:20
2. "Everybody Needs Somebody" (Julius Chambers) – 6:28
3. "I Can't Turn You Loose" (O. Redding) – 2:54

==== D ====
1. "People Get Ready" (Curtis Mayfield) – 4:13
2. "Bang Bang" (J. Sabater, Joe Cuba) – 7:25
3. "You're So Fine" (L. Finney, B. West, W. Schofield) – 4:38
4. "Medley: Undecided/Love! Love! Love!" (C. Shavers, S. Robin) – 4:04

== Charts ==
Chart (1969)	Peak position
US Billboard Top LPs	58
