= Time Has Come Today =

1966 single by The Chambers Brothers

- Cover of the 1968 French single

Single by the Chambers Brothers

from the album The Time Has Come
- B-side: "Dinah" (original single); "People Get Ready" (hit single)
- Released: September 12, 1966 (original) December 26, 1967 (re-release) July 1968 (second re-release)
- Recorded: August 1966 (original single) August 1967 (LP)
- Genre: Psychedelic rock; psychedelic soul; acid rock
- Length: 2:37 (original single version); 3:05 (hit single version #1); 4:45 (hit single version #2); 11:06 (LP version)
- Label: Columbia
- Songwriters: Willie Chambers; Joseph Chambers
- Producer: David Rubinson

The Chambers Brothers singles chronology
"Love Me Like the Rain" (1966)	"Time Has Come Today" (1966)	"All Strung Out Over You" (1966)

The Chambers Brothers singles chronology
"Uptown" (1967)	"Time Has Come Today" (1967)	"I Can't Turn You Loose" (1968)

"Time Has Come Today" is a hit single by the American psychedelic soul group the Chambers Brothers, written by Willie and Joe Chambers. The song was recorded and released as a single in 1966 by Columbia Records. It was then featured on the album The Time Has Come in November 1967, and released again as a single in December 1967. The 1967 single was a Top 10 near-miss in America, spending five weeks at No. 11 on the Billboard Hot 100 in the fall of 1968. In Canada, the song reached No. 9. It is now considered one of the landmark rock songs of the psychedelic era.

== Background ==
"Time Has Come Today" was performed by the Chambers Brothers with Joe Chambers on lead vocal.

The song has been described as psychedelic rock, psychedelic soul, and acid rock, and features a fuzz guitar twinned with a clean one. Various other effects were employed in its recording and production, including the alternate striking of two cow bells producing a "tick-tock" sound, warped throughout most of the song by reverb, echo, and changes in tempo. The long version quotes several bars from "The Little Drummer Boy" at 5:40.

Writer Chuck Eddy includes the song in a list of examples of "pre-dub dub-metal", and comments on its "feedback-drenched" sound. Eddy names it "probably the most outlandish ball of rock-mucus ever expectorated: voluminous Blue Cheer boomthud quoting 'Little Drummer Boy', cuckoo clocks, tick-tocks, 'shroom-groomed cackles, echodrum hypnotics that beat everybody 'cept maybe Dr. John to the dub/acid-house game, plus some of the most despairing anxiety-of-displacement in the American songwrite archives, all about homeless and loveless gape-generation subway-strife."

The publisher for the song, future original compositions was Chambro Music which was handled by E. E. Prager of 185 East 85th Street, New York.

=== Earlier version ===
The original version of the song, recorded in the summer of 1966 against the wishes of Columbia president Clive Davis, who wanted a white act to record it, was released that September but failed to chart. As a result, the more orthodox single "All Strung Out Over You" b/w "Falling In Love" (Columbia 4-43957) was rushed out soon after, on December 19, 1966, and became a regional hit. The success of "All Strung Out Over You" gave them the opportunity to re-record "The Time Has Come Today" in 1967.

=== Recording the song ===
Oldest brother George Chambers originally wanted no part of the song. According to brother Willie, he didn't like playing the song live and thought it was silly and ridiculous.

=== Editing ===
For the week of August 17, in his Record World Money Music column, Kal Rudman wrote that Columbia should use the "Time Has Come Today" edit that KFRC in San Francisco had made just as Atlantic Records had done with the edit WKNR in Detroit had made with "In-A-Gadda-Da-Vida" by Iron Butterfly. He said that they predicted a no. 1 for the Chambers Brothers when the single is "re-serviced". He also said that the LP would soon be the biggest that Columbia has on the market. Rudman wrote in the September 28 issue of Record World that "Time Has Come Today" was the hottest national smash from the underground and they told the reader that the eleven-minute cut was a monster at the discos. He said "Thank Les Turpin for doing the right edit that enabled Columbia to get the proper vehicle to bring it in. Top 5".

According to Kal Rudman of Money Music in Record World, October 5, 1968, Columbia Records had credited them for the suggestion of using the edit of the eleven-minute album cut that KFRC in San Francisco had made. This was the same as Atlantic Records had done with the edit that WKNR in Detroit had made with "In-A-Gadda-Da-Vida" by Iron Butterfly.

A more in-depth look at the editing of this song is in the March 2013 issue of Mix magazine.

== Reception ==
The single was a Cash Box Sure Shot for the week of August 24.

The single was a four star pick in the September 7, 1968 issue of Record World. The reviewer said that the album cut had been making it with the deejays, and here it was "single-like".

== Airplay ==
As recorded in the August 24, 1968 issue of Cash Box, "Time Has Come Today" had been added to 25% of radio station program schedules that week. To date it had been added to 41% of stations schedules.

== Charts ==
=== United States ===
==== Record World ====
The single debuted at No. 98 in the Record World 100 Top Pops chart for the week of August 17, 1968. At week seven, the single peaked at No. 11 on the 100 Top Pops chart for the week of September 28. It held that position for another three weeks. For the week of November 9 and in its thirteenth charting week, the single had dropped down from 26 to No. 57.

The single made its debut at No. 23 in the Record World Juke Box Top 23 for the week of October 12. It was at No. 15 for the week of 2 November.

==== Cash Box ====
"Time Has Come Today" debuted at No. 88 in the Cash Box Top 100 chart for the week of August 24. It peaked at No. 11 for the week of October 19 and held that position for another week.

=== Canada ===
The single debuted at No. 83 in the RPM 100 chart for the week of September 2, 1968. The single peaked at No. 9 for the week of October 7. It was then at No. 13 for two weeks.

== Album version ==
- 1967 released on the LP The Time Has Come - Columbia CK 63984–11:07, includes an extended "freak out" in the middle

== Released single versions ==
- 1966 original version – Columbia 43816 - the original recording, 2:37 in length, which is completely different from the widely known 1968 "hit version".
- 1968 "hit version" #1 – Columbia 44414 – 3:05 edit of the LP version. Fades out at the beginning of the "A" chord instrumental break with no other edits within the track. The label does not refer to the album The Time Has Come.
- 1968 "hit version" #2 – Columbia 44414 – 4:45 edit. The beginning of the "A" chord instrumental break is overlapped with its ending, followed by the third-verse reprise. There are also several other edits within this version. The label now mentions the album The Time Has Come. (Some copies with the 4:45 version were mispressed with the 3:05 labels.)

== Album credits ==
=== Musicians ===
- Joe Chambers - lead guitar, lead vocals
- Willie Chambers - guitar, backing vocals
- Lester Chambers- cowbell, backing vocals
- George Chambers - bass, backing vocals
- Brian Keenan – drums

=== Other ===
- David Rubinson - producer
- Jim Marshall - photos

== Cover versions ==
- Würm on the B-side of their 1982 "We're Off / I'm Dead / Time Has Come Today" 7" single.
- The song was rendered in a much changed way by Angry Samoans and included on their 1982 album, Back from Samoa. The video includes a bunker scene where Joe Chambers makes an appearance. In the scene, the lead singer of The Angry Samoans is about to push the nuclear button which would cause nuclear annihilation. However the president (Played by Joe Chambers) chooses life.
- Seminal punk rock band the Ramones covered the song on their 1983 album Subterranean Jungle and released it as a single.
- The Smashing Pumpkins performed it live in 1988.
- Mark Edwards, of My Dad Is Dead, on the Homestead Records compilation Human Music in 1989.
- Joan Jett for her 1990 album The Hit List.
- German new-wave band Bluefield on their 1991 album Struggling in Darkness. The song was also included on the sampler Zillo's mystic sounds Vol. 3 in 1992.
- Willy DeVille on his 1995 album Loup Garou.
- American Idol finalist Bo Bice for the anniversary of board game Monopoly.
- Punk band Die' Hunns, on a 7" single and again on their 2004 album Long Legs.
- Lords of Altamont on their 2005 album Lords Have Mercy.
- Steve Earle and Sheryl Crow for the soundtrack to the 2000 film Steal This Movie! This version also appears on Earle's compilation album Side Tracks.
- Garage punk rock band Dead Moon for their 1989 album Unknown Passage.
- Greek punk garage rock the Last Drive for their 1989 EP Time.
- Me'shell Ndegeocello for the soundtrack of the movie White Man's Burden, which was released in 1995.
- Bootsy Collins, exclusively for the 2015 comedy-horror television series Ash vs Evil Dead, which played over the credits of season one's seventh episode, "Fire in the Hole".
- Coco Robicheaux on his 2010 album Revelator.
- Robert Post for the soundtrack of the documentary Gunnar Goes Comfortable (2003).
- Pearl Jam performed it during their show at Wrigley Field in Chicago, Illinois, on August 22, 2016.
- Too Slim and the Taildraggers on their 2018 album High Desert Heat on Vizztone.

== In popular culture ==
=== Film ===
The song has appeared in many films. Director Hal Ashby used the full 11-minute track as the backdrop to the climactic scene when Captain Robert Hyde (Bruce Dern) "comes home" to an unfaithful wife (Jane Fonda) in the 1978 Academy Award–winning film Coming Home.

It has also been used in the following films:

- Die Vorstadtkrokodile (1977)
- Babylon Pink (1979)
- Bad Dreams (1988)
- Casualties of War (1989)
- The Doors (1991)
- Crooklyn (1994)
- Girl, Interrupted (1999)
- Remember the Titans (2000)
- The Hebrew Hammer (2003)
- Riding the Bullet (2004)
- Edison Force (2005)
- Nearing Grace (2005)
- The Zodiac (2006)
- Neal Cassady (2007)
- Talk to Me (2007)
- Yves Saint Laurent (2014)
- Kong: Skull Island (2017)
- Roman J. Israel, Esq. (2017)
- On the Basis of Sex (2018)
- Da 5 Bloods (2020)
- Totally Under Control (2020)
- Boss Level (2021)
- The Holdovers (2023)
- Primitive War (2025)

=== Television ===
The song has also appeared in the following television episodes:

- Almost Grown – Pilot (1988 television series created by David Chase.)
- Theme tune used for the time-travel series Seven Days produced by UPN from 1998 to 2001
- CSI: Crime Scene Investigation – "Ellie" (2001)
- Cold Case – "The Runner" (2003)
- Supernatural – "Everybody Loves a Clown" (2006)
- My Name Is Earl – "Monkeys in Space" (2006)
- A shortened version was used as a theme song for the fourth season of Early Edition.
- Theme song for the PBS series American Experience from 2009 to 2010. It has since been succeeded by a calm piano theme (with some string and wind instruments).
- Featured in the 13-episode miniseries by Stephen King titled Kingdom Hospital.
- Featured in the first episode of the History Channel's Vietnam in HD.
- Scandal (season 3) – "Icarus" (2013)
- Featured in the opening of the first episode of the third season of Grey's Anatomy.
- Bootsy Collins recorded a special version for the end credits of the seventh episode of Ash vs Evil Dead.
- Season 2 finale of Outlander on July 9, 2016
- Season 2 finale of Legends of Tomorrow on April 4, 2017
- The Simpsons – "3 Scenes Plus a Tag from a Marriage" (2018)
- Used in the "Dr Braino Show" on SCTV.
- Closing song on the seventh episode of the first season of the TV show What We Do in the Shadows
- Closing song on the 2nd episode of season 2 of For All Mankind on Feb 26, 2021
- Closing song on episode two of season two of Home Before Dark on June 18, 2021
- Featured in Season 2, episode 3 of Will Trent on March 5, 2024,

In TV commercials:

- A 2020 TV commercial for Amazon Web Services to mark the start of the 2020 NFL season.

=== Other ===
Anthony Bourdain said, in 2010, that this song "saved his life".

The song was also featured in the trailer for the 1995 film Kiss of Death and the 2017 science fiction film Geostorm.
