= The Chambers Brothers =

American psychedelic soul band

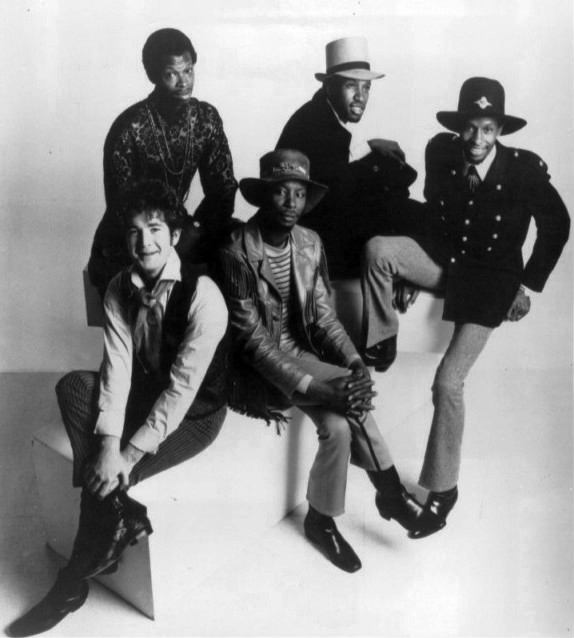
- The band in 1970

Background information
- Origin: Los Angeles, California, U.S.
- Genre: Psychedelic soul
- Years active: 1954–1972; 1974–present
- Labels: Reo; Vault; Columbia; Avco; Roxbury
- Spinoffs: The Chambers Brothers Band
- Awards: West Coast Blues Hall of Fame (Inducted 2011); R&B Music Hall of Fame (Inducted 2012)
- Past members: George Chambers (deceased); Joe Chambers (deceased); Lester Chambers; Willie Chambers; Brian Keenan (deceased)

The Chambers Brothers are an American psychedelic soul band, best known for their eleven-minute 1968 psychedelic soul hit "Time Has Come Today". The group was part of the wave of new music that integrated American blues and gospel traditions with modern psychedelic and rock elements. Their music has been kept alive through frequent use in film soundtracks. There were four brothers, though other musicians were also in the group.

== Background ==
Originally from Carthage, Mississippi, the Chambers Brothers first honed their skills as members of the choir in their Baptist church. This arrangement ended in 1952 when the eldest brother, George, was drafted into the Army. George relocated to Los Angeles after his discharge, and his brothers soon joined him. Beginning in 1954, the foursome played gospel and folk music throughout the Southern California region, but remained little known until 1965 when they began performing in New York City.

Consisting of George (September 26, 1931 – October 12, 2019) on washtub bass (later on Danelectro and Gibson Thunderbird bass guitar), Lester (b. April 13, 1940) on harmonica, and Willie (b. March 3, 1938) and Joe (August 22, 1942 – August 15, 2024) on guitar, the group started to venture outside the gospel circuit, playing at coffeehouses that booked folk acts. They played at places like The Ash Grove, a very popular Los Angeles folk club. It became one of their favorite haunts and brought them into contact with Hoyt Axton, Ramblin' Jack Elliott, Reverend Gary Davis, and Barbara Dane. When Barbara Dane spotted the brothers at the Ash Grove, she knew they would be perfect to do the freedom songs that people wanted to hear then. Dane became a great supporter, performing and recording with the brothers. Dane took them on tour with her and introduced them to Pete Seeger, who helped put the Chambers Brothers on the bill of the 1965 Newport Folk Festival.

During the late 1960s to early 1970s, the group was managed by Charles LaMarr aka Charles La Marr.

Liner notes on album releases can give the impression that there was no drummer for the Chambers Brothers before Brian Keenan. The notes by Chris Welch for the 1999 People Get Ready & Now compilation album on Repertoire REP 4734-WY say, "They added a white drummer, BRIAN KEENAN, when they were too busy singing and performing to have time to provide the more traditional handclapping rhythms." However, the Chambers Brothers had an early Drummer called Michael Konnic (aka Mike Konnic)." According to George Chambers, the group tried out a few drummers before they met Brian Keenan.

== Career ==
The Chambers Brothers provided some backing for Hoyt Axton on his singles, "This Little Light" bw "Thunder 'n Lightnin'" and "Greenback Dollar" bw "One More Round" which were released on the Horizon label in December 1962. They were also credited as backers on his Thunder'N Lightnin' album which was released in 1963. It was positive with the reviewer advising deejays to keep a watch on it and things could happen with it. The Chambers Brothers worked with Hoyt Axton again and were on his single "Grizzly Bear" bw "Gypsy Woman" which was released in September 1963.

Credited as the Valleyites, the Chambers Brothers worked with Nathan McKinney and recorded "Weep No More" bw ""Oh" How I Love You, which was released on Ray-Co R-526 in 1964. Now credited as The Chambers Brothers, they worked with McKinney again recording "Never Fall In Love" bw "Soldier Boy" which was released on Ray-Co R-527 later that year.

=== "Call Me" ===
The group recorded "Call Me" which was written by Joe Chambers and Willie Chambers. Backed with Joe Chambers' composition, "Seventeen", it was released in the US on Vault V-920 in 1965, and in the UK on Vocalion 9276. It was produced by Cliff Goldsmith. "Call Me" was described by Way Back Attack as a "raw and rockin' soul tune...with a prominent cowbell beat!". The group performed "Call Me" as well as "Don't Lose Your Cool" on Hollywood a Go Go on 26 June 1965. In an interview on 20 January 2020, Joe and Willie Chambers talked about "Call Me" and how it got played on a radio station, one they recalled being KRLA that had the Rocket to Stardom show. They said that their song was opposite to what the station was playing. "Call Me" was a "Record of the Week there". The UK release on Vocalion had a rapid review in the 30 July 1966 issue of Record Mirror, where the reviewer said that they manage a few interesting gimmicks on the song.

=== Newport ===
The Chambers Brothers appeared at the Newport Folk Festival on 25 July 1965.

They were becoming more accepted in the folk community, but, like many on the folk circuit, were looking to electrify their music and develop more of a rock and roll sound. Joe Chambers recalled in a May 1994 Goldmine article that people at the Newport Folk Festival were breaking down fences and rushing to the stage. "Newport had never seen or heard anything like that." After the group finished and the crowd finally settled down, the MC came up and said, "Whether you know it or not, that was rock 'n' roll." That night they played at a post-concert party for festival performers and went to a recording session of the newly electrified Bob Dylan.

The Chambers Brothers had a drummer called Michael Konnic. It was around the time when they got to the Newport festival, that they had an argument with him. For some reason he wanted to fight with them and his elder brother nearly got involved. According to Joe, he said "We love you man. We want you to play drums."

The brothers were backed by Sam Lay at Newport on their first night at the festival. George Chambers was impressed by the "big sound" of Lay and asked him to back the brothers on another set. One of the songs they performed, "I Got It", appeared on the Newport Folk Festival 1965 compilation LP, which was issued on the Vanguard label.

=== Further activities ===
Shortly after appearing at Newport, the group released its debut album, People Get Ready. The drummer that backed them on the album was Mike Konnic.

They recorded "Love Me Like The Rain" and "Pretty Girls Everywhere" which were issued on Vault V-923 in 1966. "Love Me Like the "Rain" was written By Brian Keenan and recorded by his group, The Losers and released as the B side of "Mersey-ssippi" on the Atco label in 1965.

The Chambers Brothers played at the Downtown discotheque club in New York during 1966. As reported in the 9 April 1966 issue of Cash Box, the group had been engaged for a further two weeks at the venue. They had been there for over a month, had been drawing huge crowds there. The drummer for the group as reported by the 26 March 1966 issue of Cash Box was Nicky Cahn (aka Jesse Cahn) who was pictured with the group in the article. It was also noted that their forthcoming LP was People Get Ready. The group was also reported to have a large following in Boston.

The group's album People Get Ready was released in 1966. It had a positive review in the 23 April issue of Cash Box. The tracks selected by the reviewer were "People Get Ready", "Call Me" and "Hooka Tooka".

According to George Chambers, the group was too busy playing different instruments to do hand claps, so they had to get a drummer. They did try out a few. Then they met Brian. In their opinion he was the best around.

In 1966, the group recorded "The Time Has Come Today". The B side of the single was the 2:21 long "Dinah" which was written by G, L, J & W Chambers. It was reviewed in the 24 September 1966 issue of Cash Box where it was in the Best Bests section and given a B+ rating. The reviewer called "The Time Has Come Today" a wild hard driving funky outing. Unfortunately, it was rejected by Columbia.

=== "All Strung Out Over You" ===
The group recorded "All Strung Out Over You" which was composed by Rudy Clark. It was released on Columbia 4-43957 on December 19, 1966. It was rushed out by Columbia after the label had rejected an early version of "Time Has Come Today". The song was given a solid review in the 24 December 1966 issue of Cash Box where it was also a Newcomer Pick. The reviewer used terms, "soul drenched swinger and "prime dance item" to describe the song. The B side "Falling in Love" was referred to as a lowdown shouter. It was reported in the 31 December 1966 issue of Record World that the Chambers Brothers, who had a professional history which ranged from church gospel singing to folk-blues, had changed direction and had a new Columbia single, "All Strung Out Over You" that was for the Rhythm and blues market. A full-page ad appeared in the 14 January 1967 issue of Record World alerting the reader that "All Strung Out Over You" was Breaking out all over. "All Strung Out Over You" became a regional hit for the group which gave them the opportunity to re-record "The Time Has Come Today".

=== Further activities in 1967 ===
Jack Devaney reported in his Cost Capers column (Record World February 25, 1967) that The Chambers Brothers were doing a return engagement at the Ash Grove that week.

The Chambers Brothers recorded the Betty Mabry composition "Uptown". It was backed with Brian Keenan's "Love me Like the Rain" and released on Columbia 44296. It was one of the records in the Pick of the Week section of the 23 September issue of Cash Box. The reviewer referred to it as a "heavy rhythmic blues-rock throbber", and do good at r&b and pop outlets.

=== "Time Has Come Today" ===
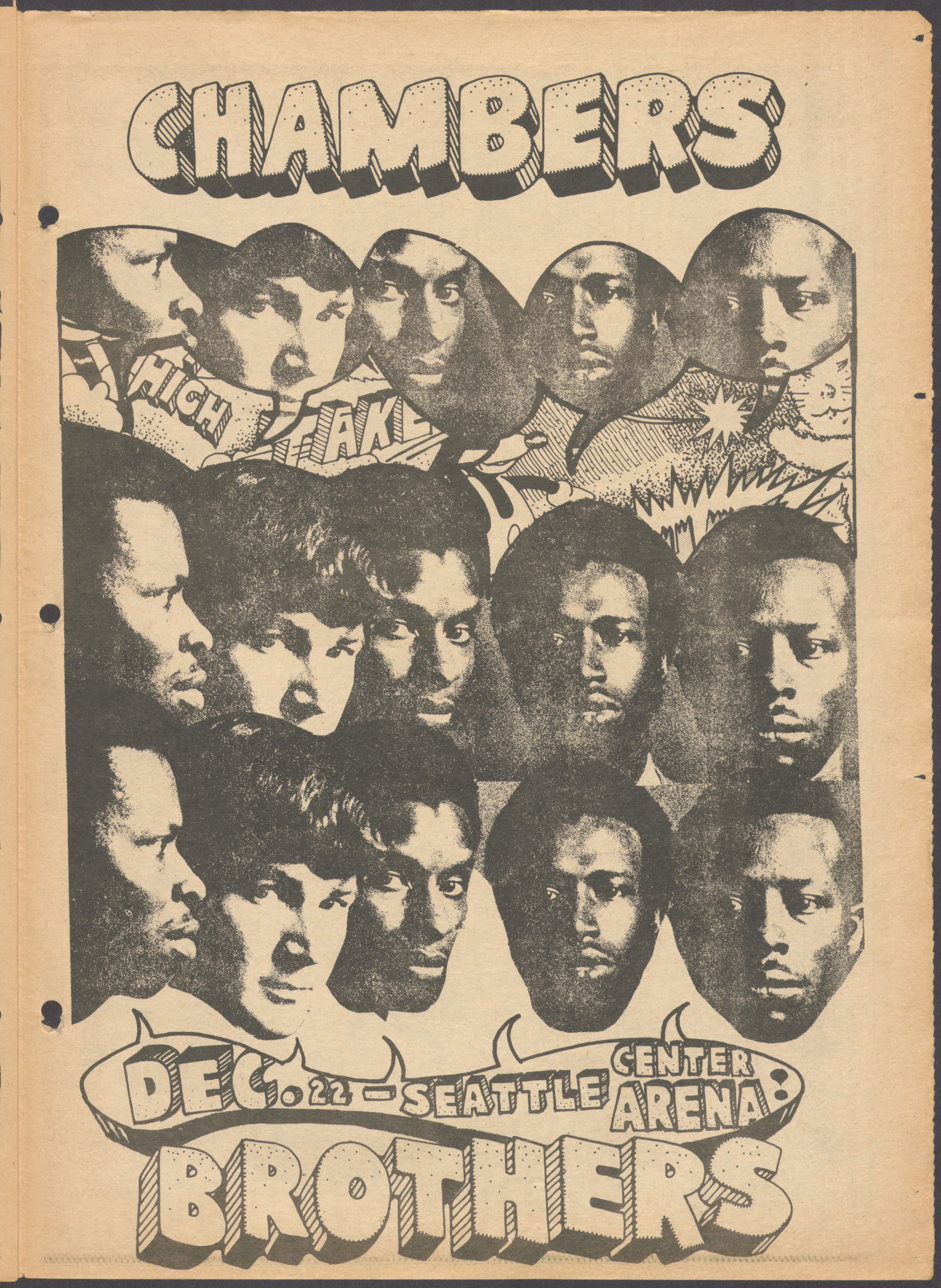
Ad for a 1968 Chambers Brothers concert in Seattle.

The band scored its only major hit in late 1967 with "Time Has Come Today", an 11-minute opus written by Joe and Willie Chambers and highlighted by echoing vocal effects and Keenan's drumming which gave the song a psychedelic feel. "Time Has Come Today" was edited for release as a single and spent five consecutive weeks in September–October at No. 11 on the Billboard Hot 100. In Canada it reached No. 9, the first of two songs in their top 30.

=== Further activities in 1968 ===
It was reported in the 19 August issue of Record World that producer Tim O'Brien, who had written and produced a charting single, "Sally Had a Party" for the group Flavor was working on a Chambers Brothers album. The group recorded the album, A New Time – A New Day which was released in October 1968. It contained the songs, "I Can't Turn You Loose", "Do Your Thing", "Where Have All the Flowers Gone?", "You Got the Power to Turn Me On", "I Wish It Would Rain", and the 7:26 long "A New Time - A New Day" which was written by Joe Chambers and Brian Keenan. The album was received quite well, which included positive reviews from Record World and Beat Instrumental. It did well in the charts, making it to no. 13 in the Record World 100 Top LPs chart for the week of 30 November. In Canada it got to no. 19 in the RPM Weekly Top 50 Albums chart.

The group's album Groovin' Time was released in 1968. Released on Folkways FT 31008, it was reviewed in the 2 November 1968 issue of Cash Box. The reviewer said that the album was recorded before they added their fifth member. Referred to as a joyous package of plenty, the album contained "Groovin' Time", "Hooka Tooka", and "So Long Baby" etc. Strong sales were predicted. It was also a Pick Hit in the 2 November issue of Record World. The album did chart and for the week of 9 November, it debuted at No. 24 in the Record World LPs Coming Up chart. For the week of 16 November, the album was at no. 23 in the Record World LPs Coming Up chart. It held that position for an additional week.

The single "Shout! Part 1" bw "Shout! Part 2" was released by Vault Records. It was a Four Star Pick in the 28 December issue of Record World. The reviewer wrote that with records by the Chambers Brothers selling like hot cakes, the record would soar.

The group was #1 Most Promising Male Vocal Group in the Record World 1968 Annual Awards. But on page 8, the group was no. 6 in the Record World Most Promising Male Vocal Group category.

=== 1969 ===
Working with producer Tim O'Brien, the group recorded Are You Ready, a composition by their road manager and cousin, Julius N. Chambers. Backed with a Willie Chambers composition, "You Got the Power to Turn Me On", it was released on Columbia 4-44779 in February 1969. On 21 March 1969 with their single "Are You Ready" already released, the group arrived in England. They discovered that their two concerts at the Institute of Contemporary Arts had been sold out. They played a special concert for the press at the Mayfair Theater on 24 March. They also appeared on the Colour Me Pop show, the Lulu Show and How Late it Is. "Are You Ready" peaked at No. 19 on the Cash Box Looking Ahead chart for the week of 22 March. It peaked at No. 113 on the Billboard Bubbling Under the Hot 100 chart for the week of 29 March, and peaked at No. 18 on the Record World Singles Coming Up chart for the week of 12 April.

It was reported in the 28 June 1969 issue of Record World that the group's manager, Charles La Marr along with Julius Chambers were in Europe setting up engagements for the Chambers' tour which was taking place in the fall. Their single, "Wake Up" was at no 1 in the Record World Singles Coming Up chart. Their album Feelin' the Blues which was released on Vault 128, was also reviewed in that issue. It included the tracks, "House of the Rising Sun", "Just a Closer Walk with Thee, "Undecided", and "I Got a Woman". The reviewer said that it was what "All dedicated fans will want".

The single "People Get Ready" bw "No, No, No, Don't Say Goodbye" was released in the UK on Direction 58-4318 back in June. It had been out for a while by the time James Hamilton's review appeared in the 30 August issue of Record Mirror. He gave it just two out of five stars saying that he couldn't bear to review it previously. He also wrote that it was so average and that he didn't like the Chambers Brothers. It was also mentioned in the same issue that the Chambers Brothers had to cancel their tour. Manager Charles La Marr had said the tour was cancelled due to a delay in completing their new album and this was very important to them. He did say that the group would be free to start their European tour from 4 January to 30 March 1970.

By December 1969, the group had released their double album, Love, Peace and Happiness which was half studio and half live. It was reviewed in the 6 December issue of Record World where the reviewer referred to it as "sizzling music".

=== 1970s ===
Due to the success the group was having with dance halls with the album Love, Peace and Happiness, the single "Bang Bang" Parts 1 & 2 was released in Belgium by special request.

The group performed at the Whiskey A Go Go, which was filmed by Lawrence-LaMarr Productions. According to the 28 March 1970 issue of Record World, Lawrence-LaMarr Productions was a newly formed production company which was connected with their manager, Charles LaMarr. The film which was the fourth special by the production co. was to be aired on National TV.

A single from the Love, Peace and Happiness album, "Let's Do It" was getting recognition in the UK. Penny Valentine noted the vocal interpretations, the tight brass and the steady consistency of the song.

By January 1971, the group's single "Funky" from their forthcoming New Generation album had been released. It debuted at no. 58 in the Record World R&B Singles Chart for the week of 16 January 1971. "Funky" debuted at no 149 in the Record World 101 - 150 Singles chart for the week of 30 January.

The group's New Generation album was out in February and was reviewed in the 6 February issue of Record World. Released on Columbia C 30032. The songs, "Practice What You Preach", "Reflections", and "Going to the Mill" were selected as the best.

Having had issues with past producers who weren't willing to listen to their ideas, the Chambers Brothers started producing their own material. According to the April 1971 issue of Hit Parader, the group had recently performed with a 22-piece orchestra at Carnegie Hall. Joe Chambers was also quoted as saying that they wanted to get into produding other acts and one of them he believed they would work with was Brooklyn Bridge.

A Greatest Hits album was released in November 1971. It was reviewed in the 27 November 1971 issue of Cash Box. There were good sales predictions for the pop, R&B and underground markets.

Brian Keenan left the band in 1971 due to major problems with the group's management.

=== Group after Brian Keenan's departure ===
Later incarnations of the group would include session guitarist Steve Hunter (known for his work with Alice Cooper). An album recorded in 1972 for Columbia, Oh! My God, has remained unreleased until October 28, 2022, when it was finally made available through multiple digital platforms. Although the group disbanded in 1972, they reformed and moved from Columbia to Avco Records and released Unbonded (1974) and Right Move (1975).

As reported in the 11 December 1971 issue of Billboard, The Chambers Brothers had taken on Jerome Brailey as their replacement drummer. Bailey, formerly with the Five Stairsteps was to make his live first appearance with The Chambers Brothers at Chicago's Oriental Theatre for one week engagement beginning Wednesday 8 December. They had also just completed a new album with Gamble & Huff. Also on that week, their single "Merry Christmas, Happy New Year", released on Columbia 4 -45518 was a Billboard Christmas Pick. Their Greatest Hits album was also in its second charting week, moving up from no. 189 to no. 177 in the Billboard Top LPs Positions 106 -200 chart. Bailey played drums on their 1975 Right Move album.

During the 1970s, they had toured from time to time.

By 1973, Charles LaMarr was no longer managing the group.

The Chambers Brothers appeared at the Botton Line club in New York in March 1975. In addition to Willie, Joseph, George, and Lester Chambers, the band also included Jeff Levine on keyboards and Jerome Brailey on drums. The opening act was the group Kokomo. Their performance plus one by the UK band, Kokomo was reviewed by David McGee in the 29 March 1975 issue of Record World. The Chambers Brothers opened with a pace that was described as "breakneck" when they did "Wild About the Lady". They Followed it up with "Pretty Girl". The reviewer said that they displayed an enthusiasm that had been lacking in some of their recent performances. They covered a range of types and kept the pace going. Other songs performed were, "Smack Dab in the Middle", "Rock 'n Roll to Satisfy My Soul", "Martha Jean" and "We'll Sing Together". The keyboard work was also noted.

It was reported in the 27 March 1976 issue of Cash Box that The Chambers Brothers had signed an exclusive contract with the Wes Farrell Organization, and record for the organization's Chelsea label. The group were to start immediately with Farrell producing their recording sessions. Present at the signing and pictured in the article were, Julius Chambers, the group's managers, Joe Moreno and Gary Frischer, WFO Music Group president Steve Bedell, Wes Farrell, and Mike Frischer. Group members; Joe Chambers, Lester Chambers, Willie Chambers, George Chambers and Greg Dickerson (aka Gregg Dickerson) were also pictured. It was reported by Cash Box in the magazine's 3 April 1976 issue that brothers, Lester, George, Willie and Joe and their drummer Gregg Dickerson had visited the Cash Box office the previous week. Full of energy, they were anticipating the release of their new single on the Chelsea label late that month. The music that they would be doing was a combo of funk and gospel. They were currently in the studio and had planned to go on the road back east for some gigs. Also in 1976 the brothers released Recorded Live in Concert on Mars for the Roxbury label.

They were signed to support Maria Muldaur on her 1980 Gospel Nights album.

According to an article in the Las Vegas Sun, Lee Szymborski served as the groups drummer for a time. Szymborski was also from Stamford, Connecticut, and was hired by George Chambers, and performed live with The Chambers Brothers at the Hollywood Bowl's Fourth Annual Survival Sunday Anti-Nuclear Benefit Concert, with Bruce Springsteen, Jackson Browne, Stephen Stills, Bonnie Raitt, Graham Nash, Gary U.S. Bonds, Peter Yarrow, Kenny Rankin and others in Los Angeles on June 14, 1981. Lee Szymborski also performed live with The Chambers Brothers and Etta James for two shows at McCabe's Guitar Shop, Santa Monica, CA July 16, 1981.

In 1997, the four original Chambers Brothers reunited, this time featuring session drummer Fabian Jolivet, to play a sold-out Gospel & Soul show at Santa Monica's venue, The Ash Grove.

In 2016, Willie, Joe and, occasionally, George, along with their nephew Jerry Warner on bass, Crazy Tomes on guitar, and L.A. drummer Jon McCracken, reformed as the Chambers Brothers to do shows in the Los Angeles area; including the Grammy Museum at L.A. Live.

George Chambers died on October 12, 2019, at the age of 88.

Joe died August 15, 2024, at the age of 81.

== Spin offs, other projects ==
Willie Chambers had teamed up with Luke "Long Gone" Miles in 1962. During 1962 and 1963, Chambers performed with Miles San at Francisco's Sugar Hill club and at the Ash Grove regularly. He also played guitar on Miles' Country Born album that was released in 1964.

A group called Hog was discovered by The Chambers Brothers. The members were, Teddy Graybill (aka Teddy Gray-Bill), Paul Alagna, Gerard Kenny, John Castellano, Roger Manseur, and Dave Watkins. They were signed by Chambers manager, Charles LaMarr for Dolot, Inc. The group had already debuted at the Action House in Long Island. They had college dates ahead for them in the East Coast through March.

Lester Chambers would move to New York and form a band with former Electric Flag bassist Harvey Brooks. Guitarists Willie and Joe would work as session men. The brothers had also been enlisted by Levis to do some commercial work for them.

George who went back to singing gospel music, would later become a deacon of his church.

Joe Chambers made an appearance in the video for The Angry Samoans' video of "The Time Has Come Today". In the scene, the lead singer of The Angry Samoans is about to push the nuclear button which would cause nuclear annihilation. However, the president (Played by Joe Chambers) chooses life.

In 1984, an outfit called the Chambers Brothers Band was formed. It featured Willie and Joe Chambers, Chris Chambers, Duke Williams, Corey Spags and Cotton Kent. Williams, Kent and Spags (aka Corey Spagnolo) were from the group, Duke Williams and The Extremes. They recorded three songs at Rusk Studios. They were "Here We Go", "Let's Get Funky" and "You Are My Life". They also released a four-track 12" EP The Chambers Brothers Are Back in 1985, twith the tracks, "Ive Been Lovin' You Too Long", "Rainin' in My Heart", "Body Work Part 1" and "Body Work. Part 2".

Also in the 1980s, Lester Chambers had teamed up with Harvey Brooks who was the bassist for the Electric Flag. Their band, The Chambers-Brooks Band played at the Jack's venue in Cambridge in December 1984. In addition to Chambers and Brooks, the band included keyboardist Jeff Levine in the lineup. Their performance was reviewed by Brett Milano in the 18 November 1984 issue of The Boston Globe. They didn't concentrate on their old songs. Instead, they covered James Brown's "Papa's Got a Brand-New Bag", Sam & Dave's "Soul Man" and Marvin Gaye's "Heard it Through the Grapevine". According to Milano the covers were respectfully done, but luke-warm and they sounded like a covers band. The second set was livelier and Chambers was the reason, and it was evident when he covered Otis Redding's "I've Been Loving You Too Long". Milano also said that "Uptown" and "Time" lacked the wild abandon of the originals. He still said that Chambers' vocals and the band's energy made it worth seeing.

Brian Keenan who had retired to Stamford, Connecticut where he set up his own recording studio, died of heart failure in 1985.

In 2006, guitarist Willie Chambers sat in with a group called Vince and the Invincibles at a benefit concert for Arthur Lee of the group Love and delivered an acclaimed performance.

In 2015, Joe Chambers appeared at venues such as Harold's Place on Pacific Ave. San Pedro as The Joe Chambers Experience.

The Chambers Brothers (Possibly just Willie and Joe) contributed backing vocals to the song "Taking Back My Freedom", which was written by Duke Williams and Corey Spagnolo, and credited to Duke Williams & The Extremes. It was released online on 4 July 2016.

Joe Chambers collaborated with Marva Holiday, recording their version of "To Love Somebody". The song was subsequently released as "To Love Somebody 2022" and the 2015 version removed from distribution.

== Summer of Soul ==
In 2021, the Chambers Brothers appeared in the Questlove music documentary Summer of Soul, about the 1969 Harlem Cultural Festival.

== Members ==
- In the earlier part of the 1960s, prior to Brian Keenan, The Chambers Brothers had a drummer called Mike Konnic. It appears that they had some friction with him. According to the book, Blues Records, A Complete Guide to 20 Years of Recorded Blues, By Mike Leadbitter and Neil Slaven, Mike Konnic played on the recordings, "Yes, Yes, Yes", "Tore Up Over You", "Reconsider Baby", You've Got Me Running", "People Get Ready" etc. that appear on the Vault 9003 (People Get Ready) album that was released in 1966.
- Jesse Cahn played drums with the group for a period of time. According to Cahn in a 2023 article by Mojo, he started playing drums with them shortly after Newport. (1965)
- In 1970, there was some confusion whether The Chambers Brothers were still with their label, Columbia. The source was an article in the March 28, 1970 issue of Record World. Apparently, singer Judd Hamilton was at a party for an American International Records signing and there was confusion about the Chambers Brothers signing to the label and whether or not Hamilton was a member of the group. The next issue of Record World, (April 4) clarified that The Chambers Brothers were not with the American International label and were still with Columbia Records. It also stated that Hamilton was not a member of The Chambers Brothers.
- There was another error, this time by Cashbox magazine, in the April 18 issue. Cliff Chambers who had his own label Cyclone Records and composed “Finders Keepers” and “Somebody Ought to Write a Book” was credited with being a member of The Chambers Brothers while he was signing a contract with Kent Records. The error was picked up and Cashbox wrote in the May 9 issue (Cliff Chambers Not Ex-Chambers) that the group's manager, Charles H. LaMarr said that Cliff Chambers was never a member of the group and that the Chambers' included Joseph Chambers, George Chambers, Willie Chambers and Brian Keenan.
- Jerome Brailey came on board as the new drummer in or around late 1971.
- John Castellano joined the band as a guitarist, touring with them during 1971 and 1972. This came about as a result of the brothers finding out that Castellano's mother made the clothes that Jimi Hendrix wore. They headed out to Bath Avenue, in Brooklyn to have the clothes fitted and heard Castellano playing on guitar. Eventually Castellano came on board.
- LA guitarist and singer Crazy Tomes joined Willie Chambers' band in 2013, and very soon afterwards, with Joe and George Chambers, The Chambers Brothers got back together for shows in California over the next 10 years, including big festivals, up until Joe Chambers passed away in August 2024. Crazy Tomes continues to play guitar with Willie Chambers to this day and The Chambers Brothers collaborated with him on several tunes on his album "Crazy on the Island", which was co-produced by Jerry "Swamp Dogg" Williams.
- Jeff Levine joined the Chambers Brothers for a period of time as the group's keyboard player. Levine was in an r&b, soul and blues band that opened for The Chambers Brothers at the Deer Island Prison in Boston Harbor. The brothers were impressed and two weeks later he had a call from Joe Chambers and he drove down to Stamford for his audition. It was around 1973 that he played his first gig with them on the Midnight Special TV show, hosted by Wolfman Jack. For a period of time he lived with the Chambers Brothers in Stamford. Levine was still with the group in March 1975. He also played on the group's Right Move album that was released in 1975.
- Julius Chambers was the road manager for the Chambers Brothers as well as their cousin. He was with Lester Chambers when they found him a cowbell. He also wrote "Everybody Needs Somebody, "Practice What You Preach", "New Generation", and "Are You Ready" for the group.

== Discography ==
=== Studio albums ===
- The Time Has Come (1967) – US Pop Albums No. 4, US Black Albums No. 6, Canada No. 11
- A New Time – A New Day (1968) – US Pop Albums No. 16, US Black Albums No. 24
- Feelin' the Blues (7/1969)
- New Generation (1971) – US Pop Albums No. 145, US Black Albums No. 36
- Unbonded (1974) – US Pop Albums No. 144
- Right Move (1975)

=== Live albums ===
- People Get Ready (1966)
- Now! (1967)
- Shout! (1968)
- Love, Peace and Happiness/Live at Bill Graham's Fillmore East (1969) – US Pop Albums No. 58, US Black Albums No. 17
- Live in Concert on Mars (1976)
- Live Fillmore West 65 (2004)
- Live (2005)

=== Unreleased album ===
- Oh, My God! (1972) – released on multiple digital platforms on October 28, 2022

=== Compilations ===
- Groovin' Time (1968)
- Chambers Brothers' Greatest Hits [Double Album] (1970) – US Pop Albums No. 193
- Greatest Hits (1971) – US Pop Albums No. 166
- The Best of the Chambers Brothers [Double Album] (1973)
- The Time Has Come / A New Time – A New Day [2 on 1 Album] (1975)
- Greatest Hits (1988)
- Goin Uptown (1995)
- Time Has Come: Best of The Chambers Brothers (1996)
- Time (1998)
- Now/People Get Ready [2 on 1 CD] (1999)

=== Collaborations ===
- Barbara Dane and The Chambers Brothers (1966)
- Mike Bloomfield: From His Head to His Heart to His Hands (incl. Tombstone Blues - Alternate Chambers Brothers Version, with Bob Dylan)
- The Four Sides of Buzzy Linhart – Buzzy Linhart (1982, EP)

=== Charted singles ===
List of charted singles, with selected chart positions
Year	Title	Chart positions		
Year	Title	US	US R&B	CAN
1967	"Uptown"	126	—	—
1968	"Time Has Come Today"	11	—	9
1968	"I Can't Turn You Loose"	37	—	29
1968	"Shout! – Part 1"	83	—	—
1969	"Are You Ready"	113	—	—
1969	"Wake Up"	92	—	—
1970	"Love, Peace and Happiness"	96	—	—
1970	"Let's Do It (Do It Together)"	103	—	—
1971	"Funky"	96	40	—
1974	"Let's Go, Let's Go, Let's Go"	106	76	—
"—" denotes the single failed to chart
