= Lester Chambers =

American musician (born 1940)

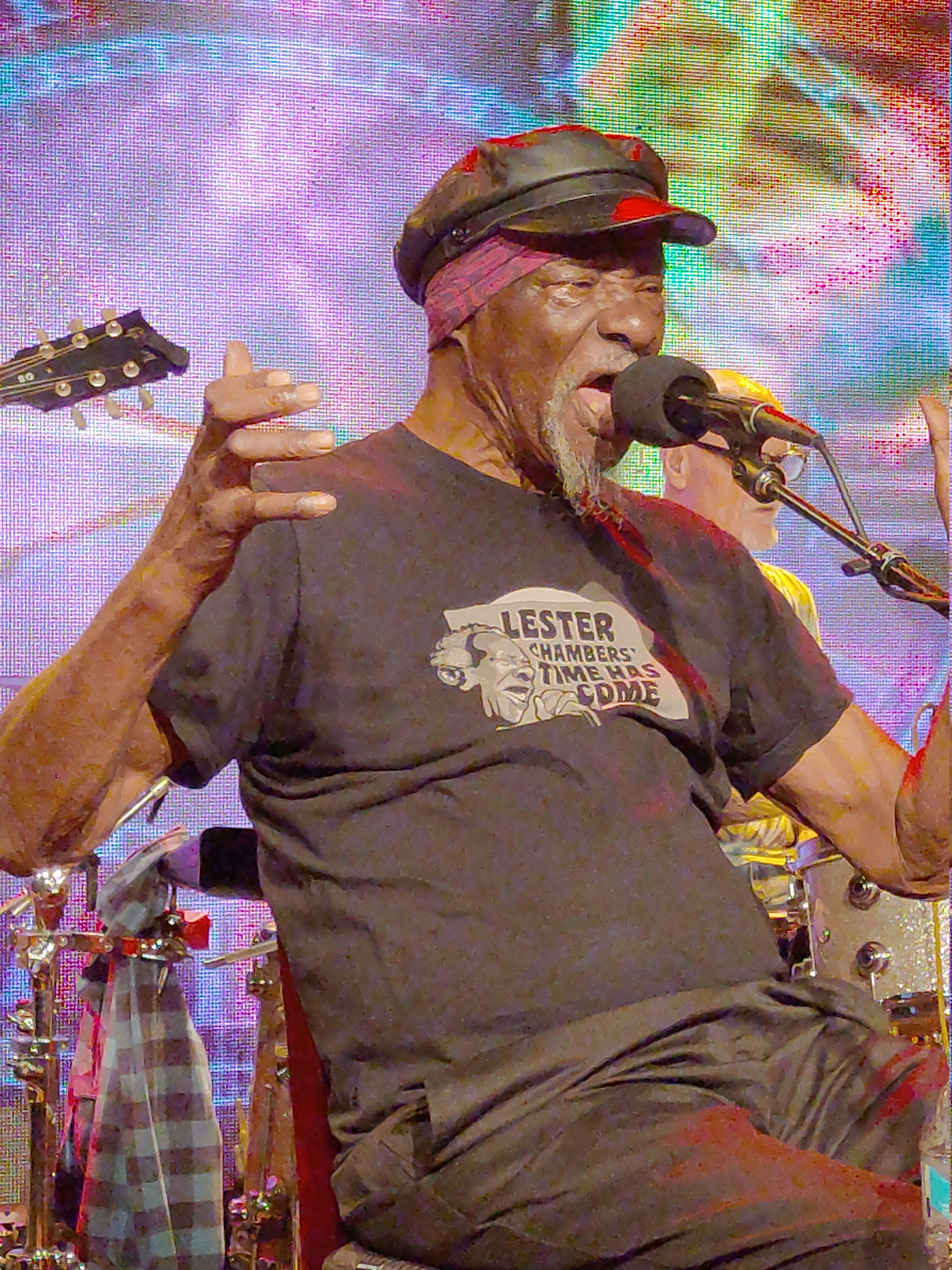

Background information
- Born: April 13, 1940 (age 86); Mississippi, U.S.
- Genres: Rock, gospel music, soul music, psychedelic rock, blues
- Instruments: Vocals, harmonica, percussion
- Years active: 1961–present
- Labels: Columbia, Explosive Records
- Member of: Moonalice
- Formerly of: The Chambers Brothers, Lester Chambers Harvey Brooks Band
- Children: Dylan Chambers

Lester Chambers (born April 13, 1940) is an American recording artist, and former member and lead singer of the 1960s soul rock group The Chambers Brothers, who had the hit single, "Time Has Come Today".

== Background ==
Lester was born into a sharecropping family in a poor part of Mississippi. In addition to the parents, there were eight brothers and five sisters in the family. Lester and his three brothers started out singing at the Mount Calvary Baptist Church in Lee County. Older Brother George was drafted into the army in 1952. After his release he headed to California. And the other brothers followed him and by 1954, the four brothers were together in California.

As a member of the Chambers Brothers, he sang lead on the Chambers Brothers songs "All Strung Out Over You", "People Get Ready", "Uptown", "I Can't Turn You Loose", and "Funky". He also sang lead on "I Can't Stand It" and "A New Time – A New Day".

As a solo artist he released singles and albums, and teamed up with ex-Electric Flag bassist Harvey Brooks to form the Lester Chambers Harvey Brooks Band.

Chambers performs with his son Dylan as The New Chambers Brothers as part of the band Moonalice which is led by Roger McNamee.

== Career ==
=== 1960s ===
The Chambers Brothers' album, The Time Has Come was released in November 1967. It Featured the tracks, "All Strung Out Over You", "People Get Ready", "I Can't Stand It", "Romeo and Juliet", "In the Midnight Hour", " So Tired", "Uptown", "Please Don't Leave Me", "What the World Needs Now Is Love" and "Time Has Come Today". It was one of the Pop Best Bets in the 25 November issue of Cash Box.

==== "I Can't Stand It" ====
Lester Chambers composed the songs, "I Can't Stand It" and "Romeo and Juliet", and sang lead on both. Decades later, Robert C. Gilbert of Listening Sessions said that the Chambers Brothers song had the feel of Motown at its edgiest.

The group Spirit recorded "I Can't Stand It" in 1967. It was later included on their Chronicles, 1967–1992 album, released in 1991. Some four decades later, Prog Archives reviewer, Clem of Nazareth called it "a west-coast treatment on a Motown type of tune that would not have been out of place at a Dead concert". The group Pacific Ocean covered "I Can't Stand It". Backed with "I Wanna Testify", it was released on the VMC label. It had a positive review in the 16 November 1968 issue of Cash Box, with the reviewer calling it a blistering rock rendering of the Chambers Brothers’ song with probable heavy discotheque and top forty response. The Easybeats recorded their version of the song which was included on their 1968 album, Vigil. Producer Dan Liebhauser worked with a group, The People who recorded the song. Backed with "Ode to Billie Joe", it was released on the Tee Pee label in October 1968. Spanish group, Los Crich recorded the song which was the B side to their version of "All Strung Out Over You". The group, The Brass Buttons worked with producer Dale Hawkins, recording "I Can't Stand It", which was the B side of their 1970 single, "Before My Time".

==== Further activities ====
In October 1968, the Chambers Brothers second Columbia album, A New Time – A New Day was released. It contained the songs "I Can't Turn You Loose", "Guess Who", "Where Have All the Flowers Gone?", "You Got the Power - To Turn Me On", and "A New Time - A New Day" etc. Lester sang lead on "I Can't Sturn You Loose" and "A New Time - A New Day".

=== 1970s ===
==== Funky ====
Lester penned and sang lead on the Chambers Brothers 1971 hit, "Funky" which appeared on their New Generation album. According to Song Facts, he said "I was hoping to create and start a new dance because everybody was doing dancing. You know, the boogaloo, the mashed potato, the watusi, the funky chicken. So I said, 'Let's make it a funky tune and talk about what happened in your home".

==== Further activities ====
Along with Maxayn Lewis and Carlena Williams, Chambers added vocals to the song "About to Make Me Leave Home" which appears on Bonnie Raitt's 1977 Sweet Forgiveness album.

=== 1980s - 1990s ===
It was reported by Billboard in the magazine's 2 February 1980 issue that Lester Chambers & His Blues Band had been appearing at the Improvisation Nightclub in Los Angeles for the past four weeks. Musicians would come in and end up jamming with Chambers' band. Word of mouth was how they got to hear about it. George Benson, Earl Klugh, Noel Pointer, Pat Rizzo of War and Al Jarreau were some of the musicians who came on stage to jam with them.

During the first half of 1982, Chambers appeared at the Tramps club in New York. He guested with the Uptown Horns during the first anniversary of the group's weekly jams at the club. On 30 July that year, Chambers appeared at the Agent Orange Benefit concert. A band formed specifically for the concert called Deerhunter consisted of Todd Rundgren, Ian Hunter, Paul Butterfield and John Cale. Other artists that appeared were, the Jim Carroll Band, Robert Gordon, Chris Spedding, Bobby Neuwirth, the Raybeats and Danny Shea.

According to the 7 May 1983 issue of Billboard, the Loners and Lester Chambers were the first acts signed to the newly formed Alfabet Management Inc. that was formed by Jimmy Pullis and Allan Kaufman.

==== Lester Chambers Harvey Brooks Band ====
During the 1980s, Lester Chambers had teamed up with former Electric Flag bassist Harvey Brooks. In addition to Chambers and Brooks, the band included Baron Raymonde and keyboardist Jeff Levine in the lineup. Their band, The Chambers-Brooks Band played at a venue called Jack's in Cambridge in December 1984. Their performance was reviewed by Brett Milano in the 18 November 1984 issue of The Boston Globe. They didn't concentrate on their old songs. Instead, they covered James Brown's "Papa's Got a Brand-New Bag", Sam & Dave's "Soul Man" and Marvin Gaye's "Heard it Through the Grapevine". According to Milano the covers were respectfully done, but luke-warm and they sounded like a covers band. The second set was livelier, and Chambers was the reason, and it was evident when he covered "I've Been Loving You Too Long" by Otis Redding. Milano also said that "Uptown" and "Time" lacked the wild abandon of the originals. He still said that Chambers' vocals and the band's energy made it worth taking.

According to band member Baron Raymonde, one of the best gigs he played with the band was two-and-a-half-week gig at the World Headquarters club at St. John's when they toured the Caribbean in 1988.

==== Further activities ====
By May 1985, Chambers' single, "Ain't It Nice to Know", composed by Victor Dishy, was released on Masterpiece MP 10001.

On 29 September 1985, Chambers was booked to appear at the My Place venue.

=== 2000s - 2020s ===
In March 2011, Lester Chambers was inducted into the West Coast Blues Hall of Fame.

Lester Chambers was a vocalist on the Work Songs album by Jaimeo Brown Transcendence, which was released in the first quarter of 2016.

Singing lead with the group, Moonalice, Lester Chambers and the group performed, "New Time, New Day" at an event held at Golden Gate Park in San Francisco on 18 December 2021.

Chambers was pictured on the 3 August 2021 issue of Blues Blast Magazine, which also featured an interview about him.

Both Lester and son Dylan who is a member of the group Moonalice were interviewed about some aspects of The Chambers Brothers as well as their current membership with Moonalice, and the Full Moonalice Vol. 1 EP. The interview was published in the 25 April 2022 issue of Goldmine.

In 2022, Chambers' autobiography, Time Has Come: Revelations of a Mississippi Hippie (co-authored by Tee Watts) was published. It was reviewed in the 29 November 2022 issue of Blues Blast magazine. Reviewer Mark Thompson referred to it an enlightening tale which Chambers told well.

== Hardship ==
Chambers has reported that despite the group's success, he did not receive any royalty payments from 1967 to 1994. In a chat session on the Soul Patrol website, he discussed such injustices that many black artists have endured.

In 2002 his wife, Lola Chambers, testified before the California Senate hearings on Label Accounting Practices that "Time Has Come Today" earned the group under $250 in royalties for the European market over 16 years. She said that Columbia Records told them that "there were no overseas sales to report because The Chambers Brothers records were never licensed to an overseas distributor". But she later discovered copies on eBay of numerous foreign pressings of their records on Columbia foreign affiliate labels for which they were not compensated.

In 2003, the home of Lola and Lester Chambers was broken into and their record collection, consisting of more than 60 Chambers Brothers albums and over one hundred singles, was stolen. Lola Chambers had spent 25 years collecting Chambers Brothers records at various venues to leave these for their sons. Lester Chambers developed a number of medical problems that went untreated because he lacked insurance. He later became homeless, sleeping in a rehearsal hall in Novato, California, until Yoko Ono paid to rent a home for him and his son Dylan.

In March 2012, Chambers started an Internet campaign that went viral to publicize what he claims to be a lack of equitable royalty payments. His Facebook posting received more than 2,500 "likes" and more than 2,000 "shares" in the first 15 hours on his "Wall"; it was featured on the front page of Reddit and there were hundreds of tweets about the story.

On July 13, 2013, Chambers was assaulted onstage during a performance at the Russell City Hayward Blues Festival after dedicating a performance of "People Get Ready" to Trayvon Martin, the day the jury found Martin's killer not guilty of a criminal offense. He was reported by his son Dylan to be in "ok" condition later the same evening. The woman, 43 year old Dinalynn Andrews Potter from Barstow was later arrested.

== Kickstarter project ==
On December 10, 2012, Lester Chambers and Alexis Ohanian (Reddit co-founder) teamed up to launch a Kickstarter project together with the intent to make a new album titled Lester's Time Has Come. Chambers also spoke with Reddit users on December 13, 2012, at an AMA (Ask Me Anything) event and to mention the Kickstarter project to those interested.

== Summer of Soul ==
In 2021, Lester Chambers and the Chambers Brothers were included in the Questlove Summer of Soul documentary.

== Personal life ==
Chambers is a resident of Petaluma, California.

== Discography ==
=== Singles ===
- "Ain't Nice To Know"/"Let Your Body Sway" – Masterpiece 1001 – 1984

=== Albums ===
- Do You Believe in Rock and Roll – Explosive Records – 2008
- It's Time – Explosive Records – 2005
- Lesters Besters Vol.1 – 2004

Lester Chambers & KK martin

- Blues For Sale – Ranell – 2001

=== Compilation albums ===
- Various Artists: Blues Today Volume III – BT Productions – 2002
