= Brian Keenan (musician, born 1943) =

American drummer

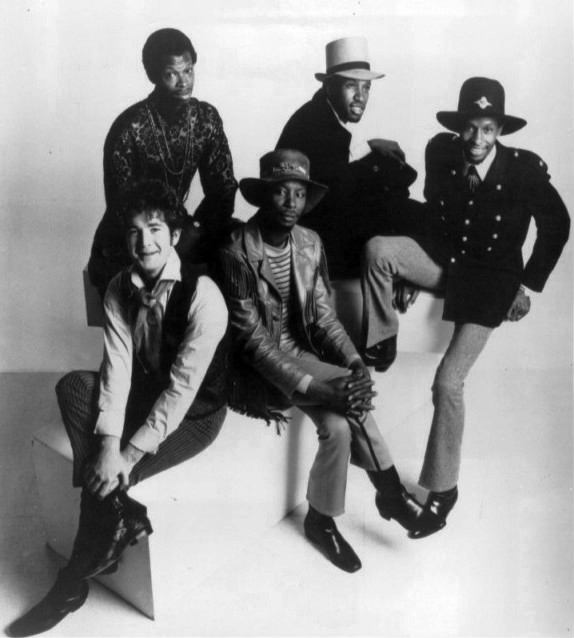
- Brian Keenan (first from left) as part of the band The Chambers Brothers in 1970

Background information
- Born: January 28, 1943; New York City
- Died: October 5, 1985 (aged 42) Winsted, Connecticut
- Genres: Rock, soul
- Occupations: Musician, recording studio owner
- Instruments: Drums
- Years active: 1960s to 1980s
- Formerly of: The Losers, Mandfred Mann Band, The Pride, The Chambers Brothers

Brian Edmund Peter Keenan (January 28, 1943 – October 5, 1985) was an American musician, best known as the drummer for the Chambers Brothers. Born in New York, he also lived in Conisbrough near Doncaster, Yorkshire, England, and Ireland as a child.

== Background ==
Keenan was part of the Chambers Brothers from 1965 to 1971, and also played with the pre-"Doo Wah Diddy Diddy" Manfred Mann group in England. His own group was the house band at Ondine, the first discotheque in New York City.

He was described by Beat Instrumental in the magazine's May 1969 issue as "the loudest and most ruthless drummer to play with the Brothers".

== Career ==
After playing briefly with Manfred Mann, Keenan returned to New York in the mid-1960s. Prior to joining The Chambers Brothers, Keenan was a member of the Ondine night club house band, The Losers which was formed around 1965. Referred to as a funky blues rock pop band, the group is said to have been made up of Joe Nessor (bass and vocal), Tony Sal (Guitar and vocal), Brian Keenan (drums) and a guitarist possibly called Russell. The group is referred to as Reunion in a Chicago Tribune article. They released a single, "Mersey-ssippi" backed with "Love Me Like the Rain" on Atco 45-6373 in 1965.

=== The Chambers Brothers ===
In 1966 at age 21, Brian Keenan joined The Chambers Brothers. There was a drummer Mike Konnic who predated him. Konnic appears to have been with the band for a short time. This was around the time the group appeared at the Newport festival, that they had an argument with Konnic. For some reason he wanted to fight with them and his elder brother nearly got involved. According to Joe, he said "We love you man. We want you to play drums."

Keenan and Joe Chambers co-composed the 7:26 long song "A New Time – A New Day", which appeared on the 1968 album, of the same name. He also co-composed "Do Your Thing" which was on the flip side to "I Can't Turn You Loose".

Bill Graham, the impresario behind the Fillmore West and the Fillmore East, felt that Brian was an exciting live rock drummer. The few times the Chambers Brothers were not top-billed (not the main act that night) with Brian on drums, the top-billed group was reluctant to follow them because they were intimidated by the Chambers Brothers with Keenan on drums. The Brothers affectionately referred to Brian as Curley and introduced him onstage as Brian "Chambers" Keenan. The Chambers Brothers predated Sly and the Family Stone as harbingers of psychedelic soul. Keenan also wrote one of its early songs, "Love Me Like the Rain," which appeared on the Shout album.

Keenan left the group in 1971 after major financial abuses by the group's management were unresolved.

=== Further activities ===
According to the 5 February 1972 issue of Billboard, Brian Keenan then became one of Genya Ravan's backing musicians. Ravan had shared billing with Jimmy Spears at the Bitter End in New York. The magazine also noted that Ravan had moved away from her driving hard rock style to a blues-soul-pop style that had similarities with Aretha Franklin and Janis Joplin.

== Later years ==
He started up his own recording studio in Connecticut.

== Death and legacy ==
Keenan suffered a fatal heart attack on October 5, 1985, at age 42. Keenan is buried at Queen of Peace cemetery in Stamford, Connecticut. He was survived by one child, a daughter, also a drummer.
