= New York City Gay Men's Chorus =

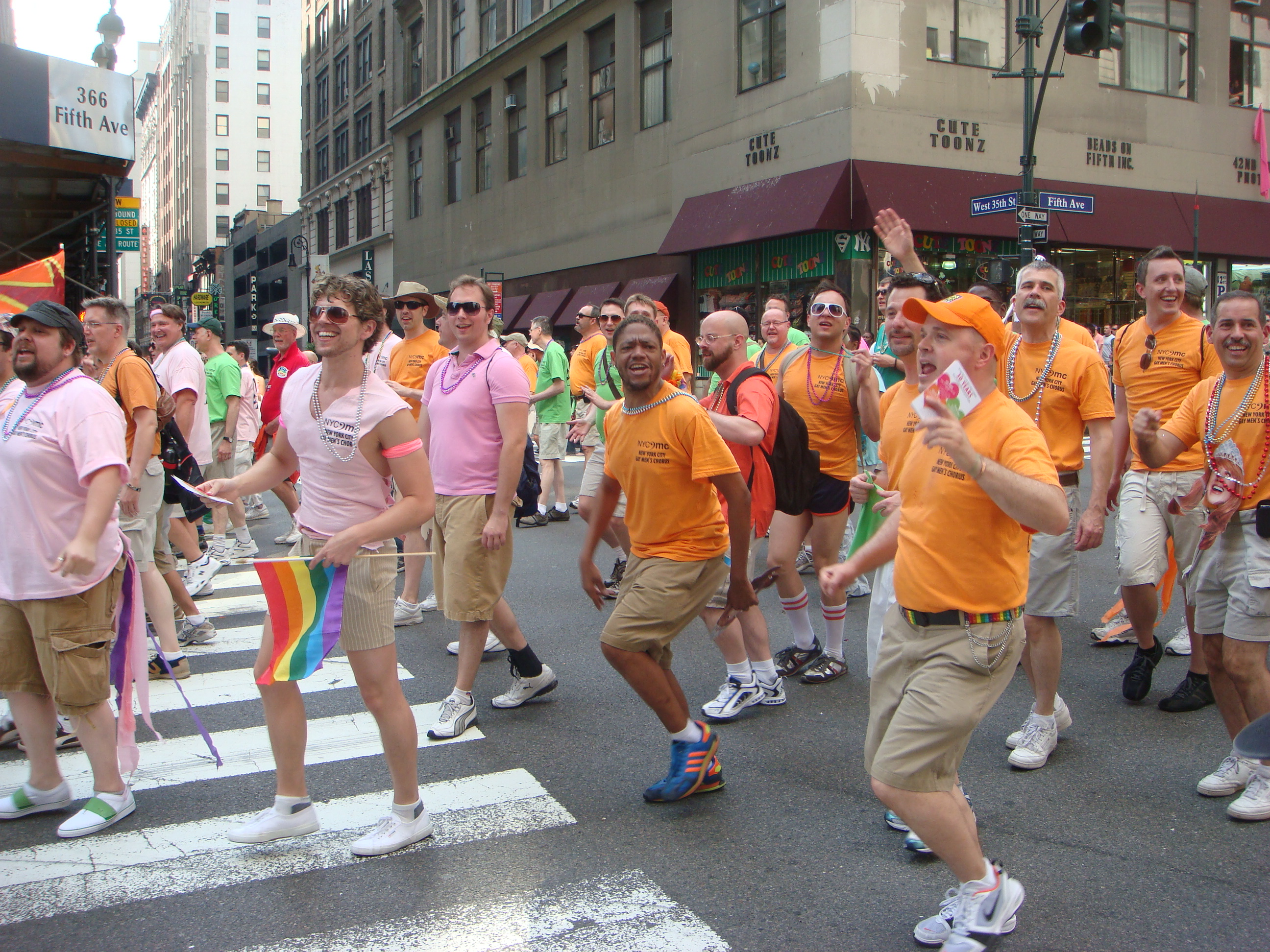
- New York City Gay Men's Chorus performing in the 2009 NYC Pride March

Background information
- Also known as: NYCGMC
- Origin: New York City, United States
- Genres: Musical theatre; choral; classical; jazz; popular
- Years active: 1980–present
- Website: www.nycgmc.org

The New York City Gay Men's Chorus is a choral organization in New York City that has been presenting an annual concert season for more than four decades.

== History ==
The New York City Gay Men's Chorus (NYCGMC) was founded in August 1980 by Ed Weaver who having moved to NYC had been a member of the San Francisco Gay Men's Chorus. Their first season culminated in a sold-out concert with the Riverside Symphony at Alice Tully Hall in June 1981 which featured new pieces or newly arranged works by Leonard Bernstein, Jack Gottlieb, Calvin Hampton, John Mueter, Stephen Sondheim, and Glen Vecchione. Music critic Allen Hughes in his review in The New York Times wrote:

The chorus is less than a year old, having been organized last August, but there was nothing about it that suggested immaturity. Musicianship and diction were exemplary, the dark tuxedos worn by all singers made for neat appearance, and the entrances and exits had been planned to achieve optimum efficiency, dignity and style.

In 1982 the chorus became one of the founding members of the GALA Choruses along with The Stonewall Chorale, the Anna Crusis Women's Choir, the San Francisco Gay Men's Chorus and a handful of other choruses and the following year the chorus was host to the "first national gay choral festival" presented by GALA at Alice Tully Hall. In addition to the NYCGMC, the festival featured performances by gay choruses from Chicago, Denver, Los Angeles, Seattle, Washington, Madison, Wis., Anaheim, Calif., and New Orleans. The final performance included performances by New York's Stonewall Chorale and NYCGMC. Included on the NYCGMC performance was a commissioned work by composer John David Earnest, with the world premiere of "Only in the Dream." The festival concluded with the combined choruses and featured two world premieres: Libby Larsen's Everyone Sang and Ned Rorem's Whitman Cantata. In 1984 the chorus performed at the Eastern Division Conference of the American Choral Directors Association (ACDA). It was the first time that the ACDA had featured a gay chorus at one of its conventions.

In 1985 the NYCGMC participated in a high-profile AIDS Benefit, The Best of the Best: A Show of Concern, at the Metropolitan Opera House; appearing alongside Burt Bacharach, Mikhail Baryshnikov, Carole Bayer Sager, Carol Burnett, Ellen Burstyn, Colleen Dewhurst, Marilyn Horne, Melissa Manchester, Bette Midler, Christopher Reeve, Brooke Shields, Lily Tomlin, and Dr. Ruth Westheimer. The chorus has continued to perform regularly in benefits for a variety of organizations and causes, including arts education funding for New York schools.

Throughout its history the NYCGMC has been committed to supporting contemporary composers. In 1985 the chorus established an annual choral competition, the first winner of which was John Burge's Songs of War. In a July 1985 review music critic Bernard Holland wrote: "The creation of homosexual singing ensembles in recent years provides more than just a sense of cultural community. Good music for concerted male voices has occupied major composers only marginally in the past, and enthusiastic performers such as the New York City Gay Men's Chorus are providing an outlet and an inspiration for new music." As of 2011 the NYCGMC has commissioned more than 100 choral works, including Conrad Susa's The Chanticleer's Carol (1981), Stuart Raleigh's Words for the Future (1985), David Conte's Invocation and Dance (1987), and Frank Ferko's Humoresques (1987).

== European concert tours ==
In 1988 the NYCGMC became the first American gay chorus to tour Europe with performances in London, Amsterdam, Cologne, Germany and Paris. The performances were all used as benefits for the local communities to raise funds to combat the AIDS crisis in those cities. In London, the concert was hosted by Ian McKellen and featured Eartha Kitt.

The chorus would return to Europe in 1991 to promote its third recording, Love Lives On. This tour featured performances in London, Amsterdam, Cologne, Berlin, Munich and Paris. Again the performances raised funds for local AIDS charities. In London the host for the concert was Simon Callow. In Amsterdam the chorus performed in a concert benefit for the Dutch National AIDS Fund. The concert, Friends For Life, featured soprano Roberta Alexandra and the Dutch National Police Band. The concert was recorded as well as televised on national television.

The chorus toured Europe a third time in 1998, sharing the stage with the Seattle Men's Chorus. This tour covered Barcelona, Spain, Paris, Amsterdam and London. In addition to their own performance in Amsterdam, the choruses also took part in the cultural part of the Gay Games V.

In June 2014, the chorus returned to London once more to perform with the London Gay Men's Chorus. The performance was at the Southbank Centre, Queen Elizabeth Hall. While in London, the chorus also performed at the US Embassy at a reception hosted by US Ambassador Matthew W. Barzun. After its performance in London, the chorus traveled to Dublin, Ireland, to take part in the European LGBT Choral Festival, Various Voices. The chorus took part on the festival stage and also performed at the US Embassy in Dublin. The Bord Gáis Energy Theatre was the site for a special performance of Big Gay Sing: Club Night Out as a benefit performance to raise funds for the marriage equality drive in Ireland. A check for €30,000 was presented to Marriage Equality in Ireland.

== Music directors/artistic directors ==
There have been eight music/artistic directors of the chorus in its history.

- Gary Miller, 1980–1998
- Barry Oliver, 1998–2001
- Jeffrey Maynard, 2001–2005
- Gary Miller, Casey J. Hayes, co-directors, 2005–2007
- Dr. Charles Beale, 2007–2019
- Gavin Thrasher, 2019–2021
- Brayton Bollenbacher, interim 2021–2022
- John J. Atorino, 2022–present

== Recordings ==
The chorus has produced eight recordings. The first two recordings were the first ever given to a gay chorus by a major label. They were on the Pro Arte label. The third and fourth recordings were on the Virgin Classics label. The fifth, seventh and eighth were independently produced by the chorus. The sixth recording was on the DRG label.

- Festival of Song, 1984
- New York, New York, 1984
- Christmas Comes Anew, 1991
- Love Lives On, 1991
- Look to the Rainbow, 1998
- Gay Century Songbook, 2000
- Holiday Homecoming, 2002, recorded live at Carnegie Hall
- Classically NYCGMC, 2007, recorded at Merkin Hall

== Notable guest artists ==
Many notable entertainers and ensembles have performed with the NYCGMC as guest artists or hosted NYCGMC concerts, including the following:

- Nick Adams
- Roberta Alexander
- Mitchell Anderson
- Jim Bailey
- Kaye Ballard
- Laurie Beechman
- Hunter Bell
- Christina Bianco
- Harolyn Blackwell
- Susan Blackwell
- Heidi Blickenstaff
- Stephen Bogardus
- Justin Vivian Bond
- Jeff Bowen
- Betty Buckley
- Charles Busch
- Dean Butler
- Ann Hampton Callaway
- Liz Callaway
- Michael Callen
- Simon Callow
- Carolee Carmello
- David Carroll
- Joyce Castle
- Carol Channing
- Stockard Channing
- Walter Charles
- Kristin Chenoweth
- Petula Clark
- Victoria Clark
- Judy Collins
- Betty Comden
- Barbara Cook
- Alan Cumming
- Jim David
- Frenchie Davis
- Shane Davis
- Lea DeLaria
- Loretta Devine
- Colleen Dewhurst
- Denny Dillon
- Nancy Dussault
- George Dvorsky
- Daisy Eagan
- Faith Esham
- Tovah Feldshuh
- Jesse Tyler Ferguson
- Harvey Fierstein
- The Flirtations
- Beth Fowler
- Joy Franz
- Helen Gallagher
- Joanna Gleason
- Judy Gold
- Debbie Gravitte
- Kevin Gray
- Adolph Green
- Amanda Green
- Ellen Greene
- Joel Grey
- Jerry Hadley
- Ann Harada
- Sam Harris
- Debbie Harry
- Constance Hauman
- Jerry Herman
- Mimi Hines
- Jackie Hoffman
- Marilyn Horne
- George S. Irving
- Jimmy James
- Erika Jayne
- Just Good Friends
- Judy Kaye
- Lainie Kazan
- Larry Kert
- Eartha Kitt
- Nancy LaMott
- Cyndi Lauper
- Jenifer Lewis
- Dorothy Loudon
- Greg Louganis
- Lorna Luft
- Rebecca Luker
- Heather MacRae
- Karen Mason
- Armistead Maupin
- Andrea McArdle
- Liz McCartney
- Maureen McGovern
- Sir Ian McKellen
- John McMartin
- Terrence McNally
- Julia Michaels
- Marilyn Michaels
- Liza Minnelli
- Liliane Montevecchi
- Melba Moore
- Rita Moreno
- Julia Murney
- Mystery Date
- Holly Near
- Bebe Neuwirth
- Phyllis Newman
- Marni Nixon
- Kelli O'Hara
- Robert Osborne
- Our Lady J
- Panti Bliss
- Anders Paulsson
- Rosie Perez
- Roberta Peters
- Billy Porter
- Faith Prince
- Sondra Radvanovsky
- Ron Raines
- Lee Roy Reams
- Rex Reed
- Ann Reinking
- Caroline Rhea
- Alice Ripley
- Chita Rivera
- Bobby Rivers
- Joan Rivers
- Rt. Rev. V. Gene Robinson
- Jai Rodriguez
- Ned Rorem
- George Rose
- Justin Ross
- Michael Rupert
- Vito Russo
- Roz Ryan
- Camille Saviola
- Sia
- Christopher Sieber
- Randy Skinner
- Marilyn Sokol
- Stephen Sondheim
- David Staller
- Elly Stone
- Elaine Stritch
- Jo Sullivan
- KT Sullivan
- Terry Sweeney
- Sylvia Syms
- John Tartaglia
- Benita Valente
- Danitra Vance
- Robert Verdi
- Bruce Vilanch
- Deborah Voigt
- Frederica von Stade
- Martha Wash
- Elisabeth Welch
- Lillias White
- Terri White
- Margaret Whiting
- Julie Wilson
- BD Wong
- Rachel York
- Karen Ziemba
