= Bonnie Milligan =

American actress and singer

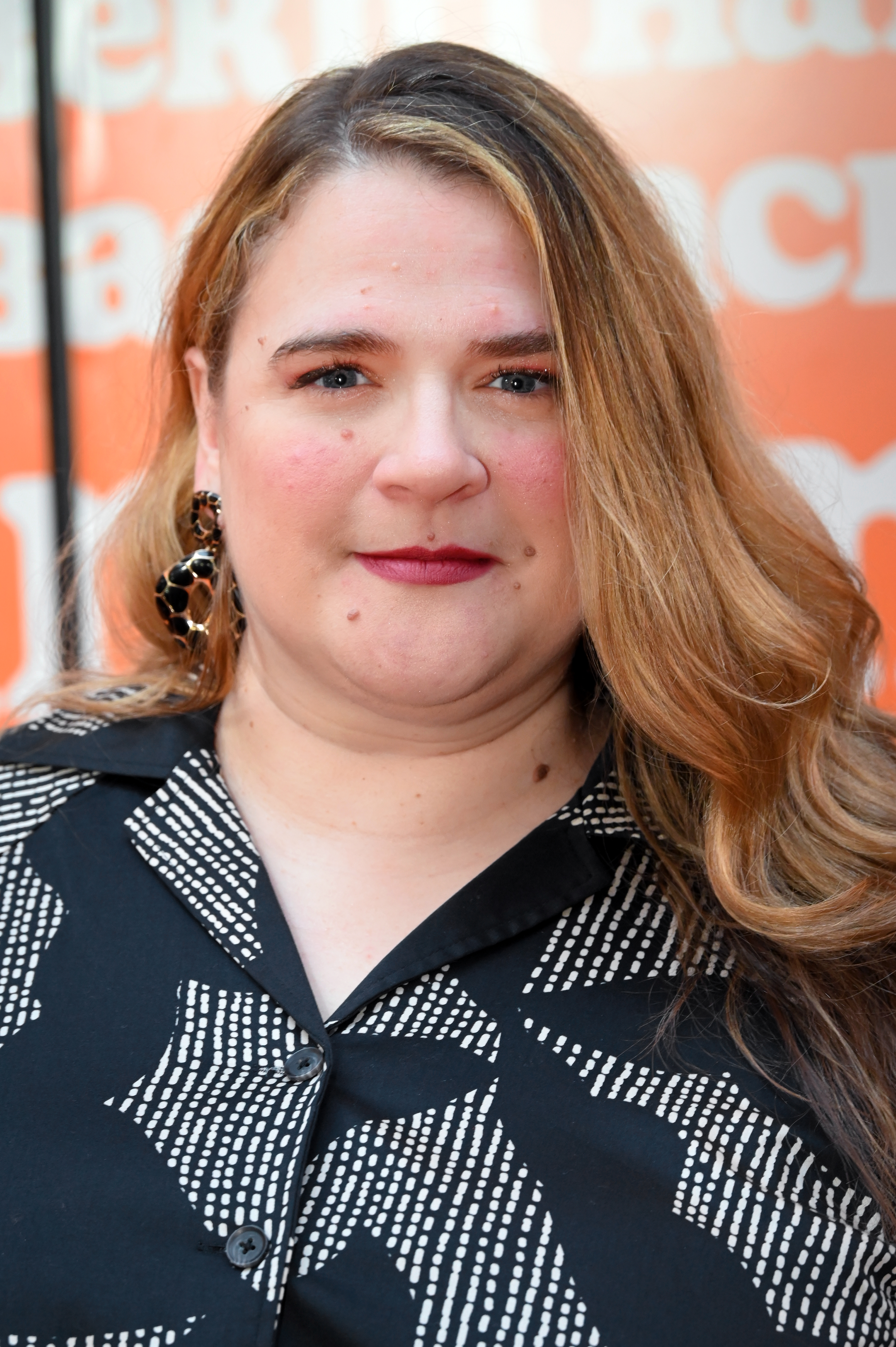
- Milligan in 2026
- Education: Ohio State University (BA)
- Occupations: Singer; Actress
- Years active: 2012–present

Bonnie Milligan is an American actress and singer.

Milligan made her Broadway debut in Head Over Heels in 2018. Critics praised her "belting" style of singing and wide vocal range.Her next Broadway role came with Kimberly Akimbo in 2023, for which she was awarded the 2023 Tony Award for Best Featured Actress in a Musical. Her television work includes roles on And Just Like That... and Search Party.

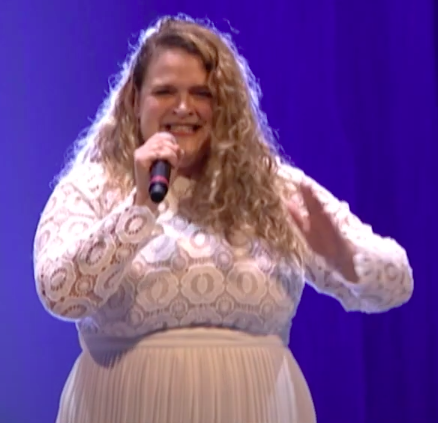
Bonnie Milligan performing in 2019

== Early life ==
Milligan is originally from Illinois and Ohio. The daughter of a Protestant minister, she has stated that her parents divorced when she was sixteen and that her mother, with whom she lived, often had financial trouble. Her father died at the age of 69 in 2020 after being diagnosed with pancreatic cancer. Milligan has one brother, Tim.

After her parents' divorce, Milligan moved to the small farm town of Archbold, Ohio, where she graduated from high school. She subsequently went to Ohio State from which she graduated with a theatre degree in 2006. Following that, she moved to New York to try to break into musical theater there. In New York, Milligan worked as a waiter while going to auditions before breaking through in her performing career.

== Career ==
=== Theater ===
In 2012, Milligan appeared as Holden in the Flea Theater's production of Restoration Comedy by playwright Amy Freed. Beginning in 2014, she played Pat in the first national tour of Kinky Boots, a role she continued in until 2017.

In 2018, Milligan made her Broadway debut in Head Over Heels, originating the role of Pamela, for which she won a Theatre World Award in 2019. From November 2021 to January 2022, Milligan appeared as Debra in Kimberly Akimbo at the Atlantic Theater Company. In February and March 2022, Milligan starred as Lorraine in the Delaware Theatre Company World Premiere theatre production of Hunter Bell, Jeff Bowen and Ann McNamee's Other World. In the fall of 2022, Kimberly Akimbo opened on Broadway at the Booth Theatre with Milligan continuing in her role. She won a Tony Award for this role.

=== Other work ===
Milligan's most prominent TV role was as Katherine Witherbottom in the television show Search Party from 2016 to 2022.

As of November 2025, a YouTube video of Milligan performing a medley duet with Laura Osnes of mostly Disney princess songs as part of Milligan's "Belting Bonnie's Bon Voyage" show in 2014 at Feinstein's/54 Below had been viewed more than 2.8 million times.

Milligan has been a vocal advocate for body positivity.

== Filmography ==
=== Film ===
Year	Title	Role	Note
2026	The Debut	Trish Donnelly	Post-production

=== Television ===
Year	Title	Role	Note
2016–2022	Search Party	Kathryn	9 episodes
2017	Happy!	Evie	Episode: "What Smiles Are For"
2020	Chicago Fire	Lisa Burke	Episode: "The Tendemcy of a Drowning Victim"
2022	New Amsterdam	Ronda	Episode: "TBD"
2023–2025	And Just Like That...	Lela	6 episodes
2025	Sausage Party: Foodtopia	Can of Peaches	Voice role; Episode: "Ninth Course"
2026	The Gilded Age (TV series)	Mrs. Louisa Knapp Curtis	Episode: "You Won't Hear Me Beg"

== Theater credits ==
Selected credits, adapted from About the Artists.

Year	Title	Role	Venue	Notes
2014	Kinky Boots	Pat	First National Tour	National tour
2015	Head Over Heels	Pamela	Oregon Shakespeare Festival	Repertory theater
2015	The Count of Monte Cristo	Ensemble	Oregon Shakespeare Festival	Repertory theater
2015	Gigantic	Daphne	Vineyard Theater	Off-Broadway
2018	Head Over Heels	Pamela	Curran Theatre	Regional
2018–2019	Head Over Heels	Pamela	Hudson Theatre	Broadway
2019	Camelot	Sagramore	Vivian Beaumont Theatre	Concert
2019	Promenade	Miss Cake	Off-City Center	Off-Broadway
2021	Kimberly Akimbo	Debra	Atlantic Theater Company	Off-Broadway premiere
2022	Other World	Lorraine	Delaware Theatre Company	Regional
2022–2024	Kimberly Akimbo	Debra	Booth Theatre	Broadway
2024	Titanic	Alice	New York City Center	Encores!
2024	The 25th Annual Putnam County Spelling Bee	Rona	The Kennedy Center	Regional

== Awards and nominations ==
Year	Award	Category	Nominated work	Result	Ref.
2019	Drama League Award	Distinguished Performance	Head Over Heels	Nominated	
2019	Outer Critics Circle Award	Outstanding Featured Actress in a Musical	Head Over Heels	Nominated	
2019	Theatre World Award	Outstanding Broadway or Off-Broadway Debut Performance	Head Over Heels	Won	
2022	Lucille Lortel Award	Outstanding Featured Performer in a Musical	Kimberly Akimbo	Won	
2022	Drama League Award	Distinguished Performance	Kimberly Akimbo	Nominated	
2022	Outer Critics Circle Award	Outstanding Featured Actress in a Musical	Kimberly Akimbo	Nominated	
2022	Drama Desk Award	Outstanding Featured Actress in a Musical	Kimberly Akimbo	Nominated	
2023	Tony Award	Tony Award for Best Featured Actress in a Musical	Kimberly Akimbo	Won	
2023	Dorian Award	Outstanding Featured Performance in a Broadway Musical	Kimberly Akimbo	Won	
