= Kris Stewart (director and producer) =

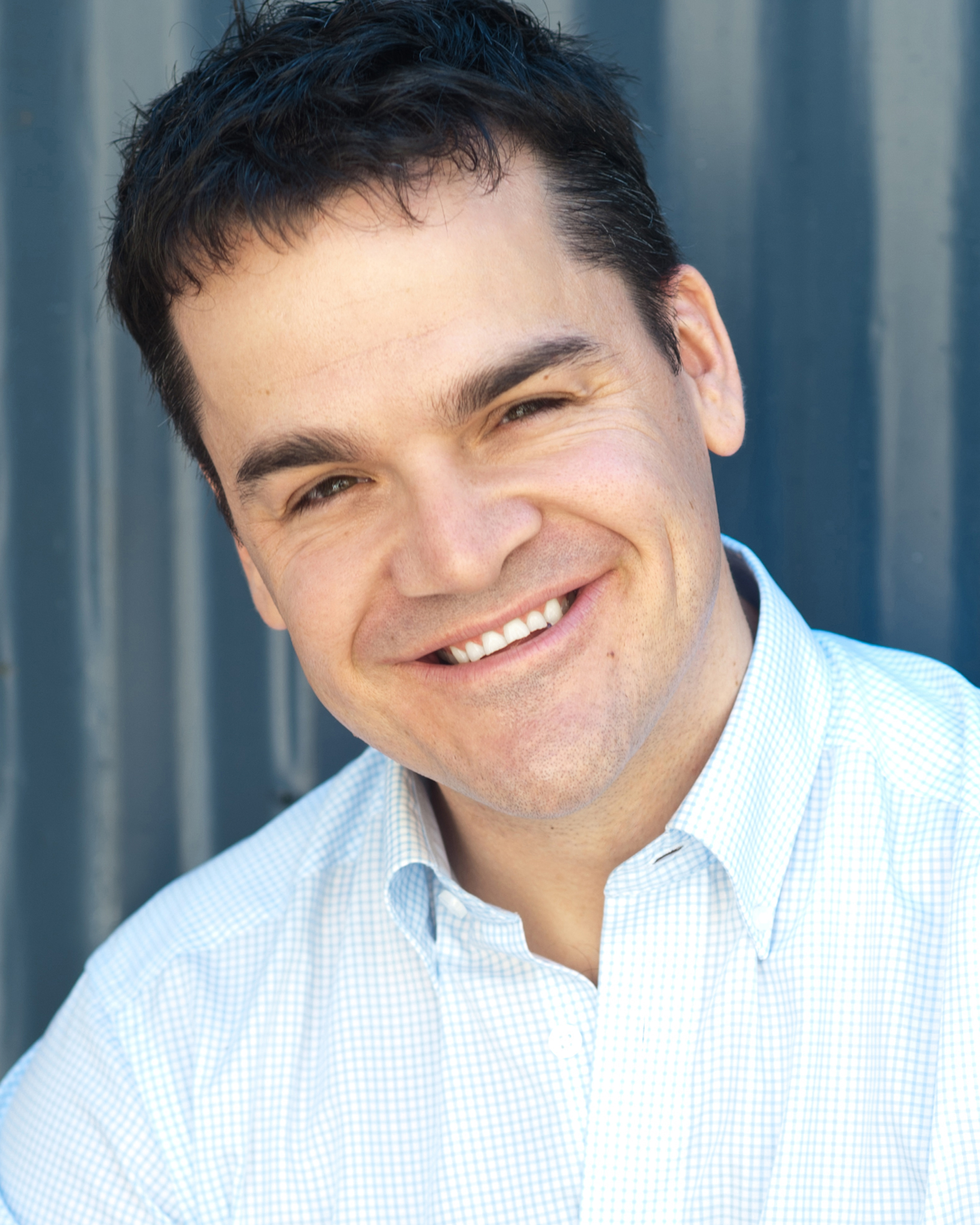
- Born: Kristopher Scott Stewart; Adelaide, South Australia, Australia
- Education: Western Australian Academy of Performing Arts
- Occupations: Artistic director and producer
- Writing career
- Period: 1995 Graduate
- Notable awards: Churchill Fellowship, Jujamcyn Award

Kris Stewart is an executive producer and artistic director. As of 2024 he is chief executive officer of the industry peak body QMusic and Queensland music festival BIGSOUND. Between 2013 and 2021, he was artistic director at Brisbane Powerhouse, a multidisciplinary arts and cultural precinct in Brisbane, Australia.

== Early life and education ==
Kris Stewart was born in Adelaide, South Australia, and grew up in the northern Adelaide suburb of Salisbury East.

He studied in Western Australia, at the Western Australian Academy of Performing Arts, graduating in 1995.

== Career ==
He lived in New York City from 2002 to 2009, before returning to Australia.

From 2004 to 2009, Stewart was executive director of New York Musical Theatre Festival, an organization he founded. In 2005, Stewart and NYMF received the $100,000 Jujamcyn Award.

From 2008 to 2011 Stewart was the resident director for the Gordon Frost Organisation in Australia for the blockbuster musical Wicked, overseeing the show artistically including casting, rehearsing and management of the local creative team.

In 2009 Stewart founded The Sydney Fringe and acted as its inaugural festival director. Over 100,000 people attended the event in its inaugural year.

In 2011, Stewart relocated to Hobart, Tasmania, to act as artistic director of the Festival of Voices.

Stewart was appointed artistic director of Brisbane Powerhouse in July 2013, following on from previous artistic director Andrew Ross. In April 2017, Brisbane Powerhouse announced they had recently completed their most successful quarter in the organisation's history, with attendees to the Brisbane Comedy Festival growing 23% to 55,099. In addition, they announced 909 Brisbane artists were represented at their venue in the last 12 months, an increase just shy of 300% in three years. In 2021, Stewart finished his tenure at Brisbane Powerhouse, after selling more than a million tickets to over 2500 shows.

In 2019, Stewart founded and was the inaugural creative director for Curiocity Brisbane, a city-wide event that combines arts, science and technology.

Through his production company Red Sand Media Partners, LLC, Stewart is one of the producers of the Obie and Drama Desk award-winning Title of Show, which opened on Broadway 17 July 2008 at the Lyceum Theatre, and the feature film Red Hook (2009), a teen thriller shot in NYC in 2007.

Stewart was executive director of the National Music Theatre Network, and has directed for The Production Company, State Opera of South Australia, Melbourne Theatre Company, IMG, Opera Australia and has directed multiple musicals.

In May 2021, Stewart was appointed CEO of Queensland based music industry development association, QMusic.

At QMusic, Stewart produces events such as Queensland Music Awards, and the national music industry conference and festival BIGSOUND.

He was a key witness at the Australian Federal Government Inquiry into Live Music, campaigned for increased funding for the music industry and in January 2025 was appointed to the Night Life Economy Commission advisory board.
