= 18th GLAAD Media Awards =

Annual US media awards ceremony

18th Annual GLAAD Media Awards (2007) were presented at four separate ceremonies: March 26 in New York City; April 14 in Los Angeles; April 28 in San Francisco; and May 10 in Miami. The awards were presented to honor "fair, accurate and inclusive" representations of gay individuals in the media.

== Special recognition ==
- Excellence in Media Award: Patti LaBelle
- Vito Russo Award: Tom Ford
- Vanguard Award: Jennifer Aniston
- Stephen F. Kolzak Award: Martina Navratilova
- Visibilidad Award: Jaime Bayly
- Davidson/Valentini Award: Robert Gant
- Pioneer Award: Kate Clinton
- Pioneer Award: Phyllis Lyon and Del Martin
- Special Recognition: The Colbert Report

== Award Nominees ==
(winners are bolded)

=== Film ===
- OUTSTANDING FILM – WIDE RELEASE
  - **Little Miss Sunshine** (Fox Searchlight Pictures)
  - The Night Listener (Miramax Films)
  - Running with Scissors (TriStar Pictures)
  - Talladega Nights: The Ballad of Ricky Bobby (Columbia Pictures)
  - V for Vendetta (Warner Bros. Pictures)
- OUTSTANDING FILM – LIMITED RELEASE
  - The History Boys (Fox Searchlight Pictures)
  - Imagine Me & You (Fox Searchlight Pictures)
  - **Quinceañera** (Sony Pictures Classics)
  - Shortbus (THINKFilm)
  - Summer Storm (Regent Releasing)

=== Television ===
- OUTSTANDING DRAMA SERIES
  - **Brothers & Sisters** (ABC)
  - The L Word (Showtime)
  - Hex (BBC America)
  - The Sopranos (HBO)
  - South of Nowhere (The N)
- OUTSTANDING COMEDY SERIES
  - Desperate Housewives (ABC)
  - The Office (NBC)
  - So NoTORIous (VH1)
  - **Ugly Betty** (ABC)
- OUTSTANDING INDIVIDUAL EPISODE (in a series without a regular gay character)
  - "Blind Date" - 30 Rock (NBC)
  - "Forever Blue" - Cold Case (CBS)
  - "Lincoln Lover" - American Dad! (Fox)
  - "Single Stamina" - How I Met Your Mother (CBS)
  - **"Where the Boys Are" - Grey's Anatomy** (ABC)
- OUTSTANDING TELEVISION MOVIE OR MINI-SERIES
  - **A Girl Like Me: The Gwen Araujo Story** (Lifetime)
  - Wedding Wars (A&E)
- OUTSTANDING DOCUMENTARY
  - **All Aboard! Rosie's Family Cruise** (HBO)
  - Billie Jean King: Portrait of a Pioneer (HBO)
  - My Mums Used to be Men (BBC America)
  - One Punk Under God (Sundance Channel)
  - This Film is Not Yet Rated (IFC Films)
- OUTSTANDING REALITY PROGRAM
  - The Amazing Race 10 (CBS)
  - Big Brother: All-Stars (CBS)
  - **Project Runway** (Bravo)
  - Queer Eye (Bravo)
  - Work Out (Bravo)
- OUTSTANDING DAILY DRAMA
  - **All My Children** (ABC)
  - As the World Turns (CBS)
  - General Hospital (ABC)
  - Passions (NBC)
- OUTSTANDING TALK SHOW EPISODE
  - "Hate Crimes" - The Tyra Banks Show
  - "The Murder of a Boy Named Gwen" - The Montel Williams Show
  - "Transgender: A Struggle for Acceptance" - The Montel Williams Show
  - "Transsexuals" - The Tyra Banks Show
  - **"Wives Confess They are Gay" - The Oprah Winfrey Show**
- OUTSTANDING TV JOURNALISM – NEWSMAGAZINE
  - **"Forbidden Love" - Nightline** (ABC)
  - "Lesbians in the Ministry" - To the Contrary (PBS)
  - "Transgender People" - The Big Idea with Donny Deutsch (CNBC)
  - "Under the Rainbow" - NOW (PBS)
  - "Will Gay Debate Tear Church Apart?" - Larry King Live (CNN)
- OUTSTANDING TV JOURNALISM – NEWS SEGMENT
  - **"The Equality Ride" - MTV News: The Amazing Break** (MTV)
  - "Military Expulsion" - Good Morning America Weekend (ABC)
  - "Same-Sex Marriage" - Live From... (CNN)
  - "Secret Love: Gay Life in the Middle East" - Inside the Middle East (CNN)
  - "Transgender Teen" - Paula Zahn Now (CNN)

=== Print ===
- OUTSTANDING NEWSPAPER ARTICLE
  - "Even Deep in Dixie, Gays Sense Inexorable Shift Toward Acceptance" by David Crary (Associated Press)
  - "Fathers in the Making" by Kevin Sack (Los Angeles Times)
  - "Gay Teens Are Using the System" by Seema Mehta (Los Angeles Times)
  - "Hill Republicans Air Out the Closet" by Jose Antonio Vargas (The Washington Post)
  - **"Supporting Boys or Girls When the Line Isn't Clear" by Patricia Leigh Brown** (The New York Times)
- OUTSTANDING NEWSPAPER COLUMNIST
  - Alfred Doblin (Herald News, Bergen, NJ)
  - Dana Milbank (The Washington Post)
  - Deb Price (The Detroit News)
  - **Frank Rich** (The New York Times)
  - Dan Savage (The New York Times)
- OUTSTANDING NEWSPAPER OVERALL COVERAGE
  - The Boston Globe
  - The Daily Press (Newport News, Virginia)
  - The Honolulu Advertiser
  - **Los Angeles Times**
  - USA Today
- OUTSTANDING MAGAZINE ARTICLE
  - "I am Woman" by D. Cookie Fields as told to Michelle Burford (Essence)
  - "The Out Crowd" by Jason Newman (Urb)
  - **"The Pressure to Cover" by Kenji Yoshino** (The New York Times Magazine)
  - "Queer Inc." by Marc Gunther (Fortune)
  - "What if it's (Sort of) a Boy and (Sort of) a Girl?" by Elizabeth Weil (The New York Times Magazine)
- OUTSTANDING MAGAZINE OVERALL COVERAGE
  - AsianWeek
  - The Chronicle of Higher Education
  - CosmoGIRL!
  - **Details**
  - People
- OUTSTANDING DIGITAL JOURNALISM ARTICLE
  - "BV Q&A with Julian Bond: Why this Civil Rights Icon Embraces Gay Rights" by Angela Bronner (BlackVoices.aol.com)
  - **"The Glass Closet" by Alex Koppelman** (Salon.com)
  - "Homosexual and 'Passionate About Islam'" by Jennifer Carlile (MSNBC.com)
  - "How Many Strikes?" by Erin Marie Daly (IntheFray.com)
  - "Is Fear the Best Way to Fight AIDS?" by Kai Wright (TheNation.com)
- OUTSTANDING DIGITAL JOURNALISM – MULTIMEDIA
  - "AIDS at 25: A Multimedia Perspective" (Newsweek.com)
  - **"Being a Gay Black Man" by Ben de la Cruz, Pierre Kattar, and Sholnn Z. Freeman** (WashingtonPost.com)
  - "Mookey's Story" by Carolyn Goossen, Daffodil Altan, and Min Lee (NewAmericaMedia.org)
- OUTSTANDING COMIC BOOK
  - 52 by Geoff Johns, Grant Morrison, Greg Rucka, Mark Waid (DC Comics)
  - American Virgin by Steven T. Seagle (Vertigo/DC Comics)
  - **Fun Home by Alison Bechdel** (Houghton Mifflin)
  - Manhunter by Marc Andreyko (DC Comics)
  - Y: The Last Man by Brian K. Vaughn (Vertigo/DC Comics)
- OUTSTANDING ADVERTISING – ELECTRONIC
  - "Bad Weather" - Orbitz
  - "Ejection" - United Church of Christ
  - "Gangster of Love" - Axe Clix
  - **"Living Room" - IKEA**
- OUTSTANDING ADVERTISING – PRINT
  - **"Bear" - Marc Jacobs**
  - "Gay by God" - Rehoboth Temple Christ Conscious Church
  - "Jack/Jack" - Paris Las Vegas
  - "Madame President" - Svedka Vodka
  - "Suits" - Paris Las Vegas

=== Music & Theater ===
- OUTSTANDING MUSIC ARTIST
  - The Ditty Bops, Moon Over the Freeway
  - Final Fantasy, He Poos Clouds
  - Peaches, Impeach My Bush
  - Pet Shop Boys, Fundamental
  - **Scissor Sisters, Ta-Dah**
- OUTSTANDING LOS ANGELES THEATER
  - **Bluebonnet Court, by Zsa Zsa Gershick**
  - Doubt, by John Patrick Shanley
  - A Man of No Importance, book by Terrence McNally, music by Stephen Flaherty, lyrics by Lynn Ahrens
  - Matthew Bourne's Swan Lake, by Matthew Bourne, music by Peter Ilyich Tchaikovsky
  - Play it Cool, book by Larry Dean Harris, music by Phillip Swann, lyrics by Mark Winkler
- OUTSTANDING NEW YORK THEATER: BROADWAY & OFF–BROADWAY
  - **25 Questions for a Jewish Mother by Kate Moira Ryan with Judy Gold**
  - The History Boys by Alan Bennett
  - **The Little Dog Laughed by Douglas Carter Beane**
  - Measure for Pleasure by David Grimm
  - [title of show] by Jeff Bowen and Hunter Bell
- OUTSTANDING NEW YORK THEATER: OFF–OFF BROADWAY
  - 33 to Nothing by Grant James Varjas
  - **Candy and Dorothy by David Johnston**
  - Dina Martina: Sedentary Lady by Grady West
  - Kiss and Cry by Tom Rowan
  - Sinner by Ben Payne
