= Now. Here. This. =

- Cast album cover
- Music: Jeff Bowen
- Lyrics: Jeff Bowen
- Book: Hunter Bell; Susan Blackwell
- Productions: 2012 off-Broadway

Now. Here. This. is a musical from the team of [title of show], with music and lyrics by Jeff Bowen and a book by Hunter Bell and Susan Blackwell. It is a collaborative work by Hunter Bell, Michael Berresse, Susan Blackwell, Heidi Blickenstaff, Jeff Bowen, and Larry Pressgrove. The four-person show, set in a natural-history museum, explores many questions of life ranging from reptiles and outer space to friendship and dying.

== Productions ==
Now. Here. This. debuted Off-Broadway at the Vineyard Theatre from March 7, 2012, to April 28, 2012. The production was directed by Michael Berresse and starred Hunter Bell, Heidi Blickenstaff, Susan Blackwell, and Jeff Bowen. Larry Pressgrove served as the music director and orchestrator.

An original cast recording was released by Ghostlight Records in 2012 after the show's creators crowdfunded the album on Kickstarter.

In 2020, the first UK production of Now. Here. This. was performed at the Golden Goose Theatre from October 20–25. The production featured Matthew Westrope, Ash Weir, Griffin Jenkins, and Ruby Lyon.

In 2020, Concord Theatricals launched a flexible version of Now. Here. This. This version was first performed by Orange County School of the Arts, in a virtual production directed by Scott Barnhardt and Peter Marinero in collaboration with the original authors.

== Synopsis ==
Now. Here. This. takes place in a natural history museum. The show follows the adventures and evolution of four friends as they journey through time--from the present day museum, to the past, and back again. Along the way, the exhibits inspire them to share stories from their lives. The action begins with a Big Bang. The opening number (What Are the Odds) tracks the evolution of the human race, all the way up to the moment when the foursome arrive at this very moment in time, on this stage, at this theatre, in front of this audience. Naturally, the discussion turns to the teaching of Trappist monk Thomas Merton, "because nothing says musical theatre like a discussion about a Trappist monk." Merton asked folks to keep in mind three words: Now (not the past or the future), Here (exactly where you are), and This (whatever it is you're doing). Merton believed that if you can get to the intersection of these three things ("Now. Here. This.), then you will be truly present to experience "more life." The scene shifts to a planetarium exhibit in the museum, and the foursome ponder life's big and small questions, each expressing their desire for things that they hope will bring them happiness: more stuff, more love, more magic dogs named "Mr. Winston Sparkles" (More Life). The group decides to divide and conquer the museum in search of more life and the Now. Here. This. As they explore, exhibits begin to trigger memories and stories. At the deep sea exhibit, Jeff relives his experience performing at his middle school's Pancake Supper where she slays the audience with a mean Ed Grimley impersonation, and discovers his ability to cloak his true self from unwanted scrutiny (Dazzle Camouflage). For Heidi, it's recollections of childhood attention-seeking in the Hall of Birds (Give Me Your Attention). Hunter escapes into his familiar fantasy world while staring at a turtle display, imagining good times with his superdeluxe fantasy boyfriend (Archer), and at the bee exhibit, Susan recognizes herself as the busy bee who over-schedules her life with activities to distract from the discomfort of growing up in an unusual house (I Rarely Schedule Nothing). As their memories and stories grow into a chaotic (Cacophony), they all begin to understand the obstacles that stand between them and the Now. Here. This. The four then regroup in the Hall of Human Origins. Native garments and rituals ignite adolescent hopes of the perfect garment that will bring happiness and popularity (Members Only). Susan and Heidi sing about two kinds of lives with two different sets of struggles (That'll Never Be Me). Jeff recalls the regret of missing out on real college friends and fun because he was afraid to reveal his true self (Kick Me). The four friends continue to explore the museum and come across information about Aboriginal family trees and tribes. The gang sings in celebration of having found each other--their chosen tribe--out of all the people in the world (Then Comes You). A museum exhibit about the measurement of time inspires them to sing about an afternoon boat ride that seemed to last a millennium (The Amazing Adventures of the "Doc" Wilbert S. Pound). In (That Makes Me Hot) they exchange stories about moments when they found themselves in the 'Now. Here. This. Susan shares the myth of the ("Golden Palace"), a faraway place where only the privileged few are granted admission. In (Get Into It) we experience Hunter's fantasy world from the inside and the outside. Heidi struggles with rules and expectations determined long ago, eventually realizing that she can now define her own rules and choose her own adventure (This Time). After a full day at the museum, the ("Finale") exhorts the audience leave the museum of the past, to consciously step directly into the Now. Here. This. and ultimately experience more life.

== Musical numbers ==
- "What are the Odds?" — Jeff, Hunter, Susan, Heidi
- "More Life" — Jeff, Hunter, Susan, Heidi
- "Dazzle Camouflage" — Jeff, Hunter, Susan, Heidi
- "Give Me Your Attention" — Susan, Heidi
- "Archer" — Hunter
- "I Rarely Schedule Nothing/ Cacophony" — Jeff, Hunter, Susan, Heidi
- "Members Only" — Jeff, Hunter, Susan, Heidi
- "That'll Never Be Me" — Susan, Heidi
- "Kick Me" — Jeff
- "Then Comes You" — Jeff, Hunter, Susan, Heidi
- "The Amazing Adventures of 'Doc' Wilbert S. Pound" — Jeff, Hunter, Susan, Heidi
- "That Makes Me Hot" — Jeff, Hunter, Susan, Heidi
- "Golden Palace" — Jeff, Hunter, Susan, Heidi
- "Get Into It" — Hunter, Susan, Heidi
- "This Time" — Heidi
- "Finale: Now. Here. This." — Jeff, Hunter, Susan, Heidi
