= Heidi Blickenstaff =

American actress (born 1971)

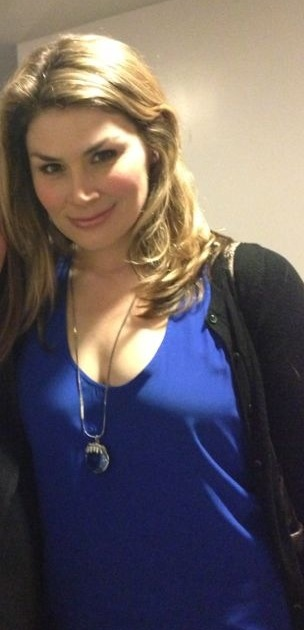
- Blickenstaff in 2012
- Born: December 28, 1971 (age 54); Fresno, California
- Education: Duke University
- Occupations: Actress, singer
- Years active: 1995–present
- Spouse: Nicholas Rohlfing (m. 2015)

Heidi Blickenstaff (born December 28, 1971) is an American actress and singer based in New York City best known for playing a version of herself in the musical [title of show] during its Off-Broadway and Broadway runs, as well as for originating the role of Bea in the 2015 musical Something Rotten!. She co-starred with Cozi Zuehlsdorff in the Disney Channel musical version of Freaky Friday which was broadcast on August 10, 2018.

Her further Broadway credits include The Little Mermaid as Ursula, The Addams Family as Alice, and Jagged Little Pill as MJ.

== Personal life ==
Blickenstaff grew up in Fresno, California, and got her start in musical theater at Good Company Players, where her roles included "Annie" in the musical of the same name. She is a graduate of Roosevelt High School in Fresno, Calif., and Duke University's Department of Theater Studies.

Her father, Dale Blickenstaff, is the former District Attorney of Fresno County. In 2015, Blickenstaff married Nicholas Rohlfing. She has two stepsons, Jonah and Malcolm Rohlfing.

== Career ==
Blickenstaff is a Broadway performer who gained widespread notice for her work in [title of show] after some years of working in understudy, supporting, and ensemble roles. The musical documents its own creation by Broadway fans Jeff Bowen and Hunter Bell, who want to enter the New York Musical Theatre Festival and struggle to complete the show in three and a half weeks with their two actress friends. The actors are also the writers and characters of the musical. Blickenstaff has said her character in [title of show], a struggling actor also named "Heidi", is a "concentrated version" of her actual personality.

She also has credited her experience in [title of show] with easing her chronic stage fright, a form of self-doubt immortalized in one of the show's songs, "Die Vampire Die". "I also have a stage fright vampire", she told TheaterMania in 2006, during [title of show]'s extended off-Broadway run at the Vineyard Theatre. "Certainly, [title of show] has been great medicine, because we talk about that stuff."

=== Other work ===
Blickenstaff's other Broadway credits include The Full Monty on Broadway (as Susan Hershey) and The Little Mermaid (as Carlotta/Ensemble and u/s for Ursula).

In 2006, she starred in the musical Meet John Doe at the Ford's Theatre in Washington, D.C., winning a Helen Hayes Award for her performance.

Of Blickenstaff's performance in the musical—an adaptation of the 1941 Frank Capra film of the same name—Peter Marks wrote in The Washington Post: "She's a dynamite successor to the movie's Barbara Stanwyck: It's a star performance, in fact. There's an effortless kind of kick to Blickenstaff's readings of Ann's sharp-elbowed lines. And she can sing, to boot."

Blickenstaff's other regional credits include roles in The Girl in the Frame at the Goodspeed Opera House, Bat Boy at Theatreworks in Palo Alto, California, and Prairie at New York Stage and Film.

She has also performed in touring productions of The Full Monty, Jekyll & Hyde (as the understudy for the role of Lucy Harris), Steel Pier, Dreamgirls, and The Who's Tommy. It was during the Tommy tour that Blickenstaff met her future [title of show] co-star (and the musical's co-creator/composer) Jeff Bowen.

She has appeared in a television commercials for Nationwide Insurance and Foster Grant.

Blickenstaff replaced Sherie Rene Scott as Ursula in the Broadway production of The Little Mermaid on January 27, 2009, and stayed with the show until April 5, 2009. She was succeeded by Faith Prince.

She replaced Carolee Carmello as Alice Beineke in The Addams Family on March 8, 2011.

Blickenstaff was a member of the original cast of the review First You Dream: The Music of Kander and Ebb, which premiered at the Signature Theatre in Arlington, Virginia, in 2009, and the revival that played at the Kennedy Center in Washington, D.C., in June 2012.

In July 2013, Blickenstaff played Diana in Next to Normal at the Weston Playhouse in Weston, Vermont.

In April 2014, she played Cleo in the City Center Encores! staging of The Most Happy Fella with Laura Benanti and Cheyenne Jackson.

Blickenstaff played Jane/Bonnie in the world premiere of Dog and Pony at The Old Globe Theatre from May through July 2014 with Nicole Parker, Beth Leavel, Jon Patrick Walker, and Eric William Morris. Dog and Pony has a book by Rick Elice and music and lyrics by Michael Patrick Walker, and was directed by Roger Rees.

From November 2014 to January 2015, Blickenstaff played Emily Hobbs in Paper Mill Playhouse's production of Elf: The Musical.

Blickenstaff returned to Broadway in March 2015, originating the role of Bea in Something Rotten!, alongside Christian Borle and Brian d'Arcy James.

In the fall of 2017, Blickenstaff filmed the new Disney Channel musical version of Freaky Friday as the mother whose personality "swaps" with her daughter, played by Cozi Zuehlsdorff. The film was broadcast on Disney Channel in August 2018.

Blickenstaff can be heard on the cast recordings of [title of show], Now. Here. This., Meet John Doe, The Little Mermaid, and Something Rotten!. She also sang on the recordings "Sweet Bye and Bye," featuring the music of Vernon Duke; "Jerome Kern: The Land Where the Good Songs Go"; Michael Kooman and Christopher Dimond's "Out of Our Heads"; "Keys: The Music of Scott Alan"; and Georgia Stitt's "My Lifelong Love." Heidi also recorded a stand alone track to Uninvited with the Original Broadway Cast of Jagged Little Pill that was released in the fall on 2022.

In 2025, she starred in the world premiere of the musical The Heart at the La Jolla Playhouse.

== Theatre ==
Year	Show	Role	Notes
1995	Mame	Ensemble	Carousel Dinner Theatre
1996	The Who's Tommy	Ensemble Mrs. Walker (u/s)	National tour
1997	Dreamgirls	Ensemble	National tour
1998	Steel Pier	Shelby Stevens	National tour
1999	Jekyll & Hyde	Ensemble Lucy Harris (u/s)	National tour; left in 2000
2000	The Full Monty	Susan Hershey Vicky Nichols	National tour; left in 2001
2002	The Full Monty	Susan Hershey Vicky Nichols	Broadway; closed in 2002
2003	Bat Boy: The Musical	Meredith Parker	Theatreworks, Jul. 19 - Aug. 10, 2003
2003	Prairie	Caroline Ingalls	New York Fringe Festival
2004	[title of show]	Stacia	New York Musical Theatre Festival, Sep. 2004
2005	The Girl in the Frame		Goodspeed Opera House
2005	[title of show]	Heidi	Eugene O'Neill Theater Center
2005	[title of show]	Heidi	Off-off-Broadway; Sep. 2005
2006	[title of show]	Heidi	Off-Broadway; Feb. 26 - Oct. 1, 2006
2006	Meet John Doe	Ann Mitchell	Ford's Theatre
2006	The Best Little Whorehouse in Texas	Dogette	Broadway concert
2007	The Little Mermaid	Carlotta Ursula (u/s)	Broadway; Nov. 3, 2007 - Apr. 21, 2008
2008	[title of show]	Heidi	Broadway; Jul. 17 - Oct. 8, 2008
2009	The Little Mermaid	Ursula	Broadway; Jan. 27 - Apr. 6, 2009
2009	First You Dream: The Music of Kander and Ebb	Performer	Signature Theatre
2011	The Addams Family	Alice Beineke	Broadway; Mar. 7 - Dec. 31, 2011
2012	First You Dream: The Music of Kander and Ebb	Performer	Kennedy Center
2012	Now. Here. This.	Heidi	Off-Broadway; Mar. 7 - Apr. 28, 2012
2013	Next to Normal	Diana	Weston Playhouse Theatre Company
2014	The Most Happy Fella	Cleo	Encores!, Apr. 2014
2014	Dog and Pony	Jane/Bonnie	Old Globe Theatre, May - July 2014 (world premiere)
2014	Elf	Emily Hobbs	Paper Mill Playhouse, Nov. 2014 - Jan. 2015
2015	Something Rotten!	Bea Bottom	Broadway; Apr. 22, 2015 - July 16, 2016
2016	Freaky Friday	Katherine Blake	Signature Theatre; Oct. 4 - Nov. 20, 2016
2017	Freaky Friday	Katherine Blake	La Jolla Playhouse
2018	My One and Only	Mickey	Stephen Sondheim Theatre
2021	Jagged Little Pill	MJ Healy	Broadway; Broadhurst Theatre
2022	Jagged Little Pill	MJ Healy	North American Tour
2025	The Heart	Claire and others	La Jolla Playhouse

== Filmography ==
=== Film ===
Year	Title	Role	Notes
2009	The Rebound	Morning Mom	
2013	Sing Along	Ms. Kelly	Short
2015	First You Dream: The Music of Kander and Ebb	Performer	TV film
2018	Freaky Friday	Katherine Blake	TV film

=== Television ===
Year	Title	Role	Notes
2004	Hope & Faith	Woman	Episode: "The Dolly Mama"
2008	The 53rd Drama Desk Awards	Host	TV special
2014	Submissions Only	Diana Rioux	Episode: "Having Foresight"
2015	Renaissance Woman: Backstage at Something Rotten! with Heidi Blickenstaff	Self	8 episodes

== Discography ==
Year	Title	Notes
2006	[title of show] (Original cast recording)	On 14 tracks
2008	The Little Mermaid (Original Broadway cast recording)	Mainly background singing
2012	Now. Here. This. (Original cast recording)	On 14 tracks
2015	Something Rotten! (Original Broadway cast recording)	On four tracks
2017	Freaky Friday (musical) (Original cast recording)	On 13 tracks
2018	Freaky Friday (2018 film) (Film soundtrack)	On 8 tracks

== Awards and nominations ==
Year	Award	Category	Work	Result
2006	Helen Hayes Award	Best Actress in a Musical	Meet John Doe	Won
2006	Obie Award	Special Citations	[title of show]	Won
2006	Drama League Award	Distinguished Performance	[title of show]	Nominated
2009	Broadway.com Audience Award	Favorite Ensemble Cast	[title of show]	Won
2009	Broadway.com Audience Award	Favorite Featured Actress in a Musical	[title of show]	Nominated
2009	Broadway.com Audience Award	Favorite Diva Performance	[title of show]	Nominated
2009	Broadway.com Audience Award	Favorite Breakthrough Performance (Female)	[title of show]	Nominated
2009	Broadway.com Audience Award	Favorite Replacement (Female)	The Little Mermaid	Nominated
2015	Outer Critics Circle Award	Outstanding Featured Actress in a Musical	Something Rotten!	Nominated
