= Susan Blackwell =

American actress, writer, and singer

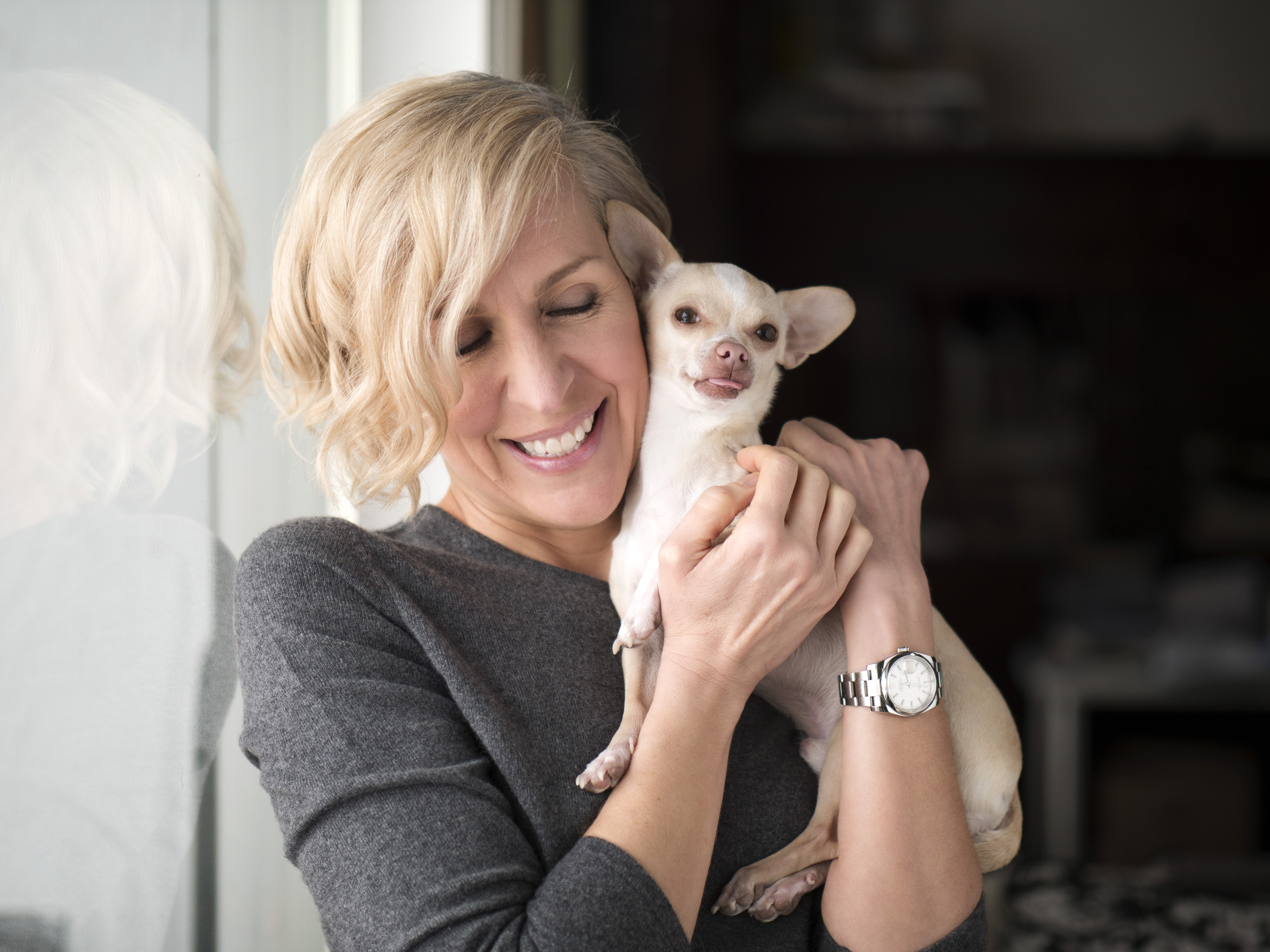
- Blackwell in 2017
- Born: Dayton, Ohio, US
- Education: Wright State University (BFA); University of Minnesota (MFA)
- Occupations: Actress; writer; singer
- Known for: [title of show]
- Spouse: Nathan Heidt
- Website: susanblackwell.com

Susan Blackwell is an American actress, writer, and singer, best known for playing characters based on herself in the original musicals [title of show] and Now. Here. This. She has appeared in other plays, musicals, films, and television shows including Master of None, Madam Secretary, The Blacklist, Succession, Law & Order, P.S. I Love You, After the Wedding, Yes, God, Yes, and Speech and Debate. She created and hosts her own talk show, Side by Side by Susan Blackwell on Broadway.com.

== [title of show] ==
Blackwell is known for the one-act musical [title of show], which played on Broadway in the 2008 Season after a successful extended Off-Broadway run at the Vineyard Theatre in 2006. The musical documents its own creation by two Broadway fans, who want to enter the New York Musical Theatre Festival and struggle to complete the show in three and a half weeks, and their two actress friends. The actors are also the writers and characters of the musical. Blackwell's character, "Susan", is a quirky performer by night and corporate drone by day—what Blackwell calls a "distillation" of her true personality.

Blackwell became involved in the musical's development early on through her longstanding friendships with the show's writer, Hunter Bell, and composer, Jeff Bowen (who also star in the show, as "Hunter" and "Jeff"). Blackwell had worked with the two men as part of her previous Off-Off-Broadway performing duo, the New Wondertwins. At the time Bowen and Bell began work on [title of show], Blackwell had decided to abandon performing for a stable, corporate office job. "I feel really grateful to my friends for rescuing me," she said of her role in [title of show]. "They airlifted me out of very corporate ascension and plopped me down into this whole other experience."

== Other work ==
Blackwell began her professional acting career with a two-year stint in the company of Minnesota's Guthrie Theatre before moving to New York in 1995. She subsequently developed a reputation as a quirky downtown theatre artist. Blackwell performed Off-Off-Broadway with Rebecca Finnegan as The New Wondertwins, a variety act whose assortment of songs, sketches, and daredevil feats included ventriloquism and making deviled eggs in their mouths.

One Village Voice reviewer wrote of the duo in 1999: "Their wordless finale, orchestrated to a space-age bachelor-pad soundtrack, is a tour de force of fascination and horror: never have soy milk and deviled eggs been used to such loathsome effect." In addition to [title of show]'s Off-Broadway and Broadway runs, Blackwell's more recent credits include the Off-Broadway shows Speech and Debate, Anon, Working Title, Vilna's Got a Golem, and The Heidi Chronicles.

Blackwell's television appearances include The Sopranos, Third Watch, All My Children, The Good Wife, Person of Interest, and several episodes of Law & Order and Law & Order: Criminal Intent. Her film credits include P.S. I Love You, Margin Call, Margot at the Wedding, Changing Lanes, the short Bun-Bun, and Night Int. Trailer for the feature film Ten Minutes Older.

Blackwell joined [title of show] castmates Hunter Bell, Jeff Bowen, and Heidi Blickenstaff in 2012 for the off-Broadway musical Now. Here. This. for which she also co-wrote the book with Hunter Bell.

In 2018, she was seen in the Encores! Off-Center production of The Civilians' Gone Missing.

In 2019, Blackwell performed in a one-night-only Broadway concert performance of [title of show] to benefit The Actor's Fund. She appeared alongside the entire original cast, and the evening was directed and choreographed by Michael Berresse.

In September 2019, she began co-hosting a podcast with fellow actress Laura Camien called The Spark File.

== Personal life ==
Blackwell was born and raised in Dayton, Ohio. She attended Bethel Local Schools. She has a B.F.A. in acting from Wright State University and an M.F.A. in acting from the University of Minnesota. She is married to Nathan Heidt.

== Acting credits ==
=== Theatre ===
Year	Title	Role	Notes	Ref.
1996	Working Title	Laura Teichman	Off-Broadway - American Jewish Theatre	
1997	Vilna's Got a Golem	Basha	Off-Broadway - American Jewish Theatre	
2006	[title of show]	Susan	Off-Broadway - Vineyard Theatre	
2007	Anon		Off-Broadway - Atlantic Theater Company	
2007	Speech and Debate	Teacher/Reporter	Off-Broadway - Roundabout Theatre Company	
2008	[title of show]	Susan	Broadway - Lyceum Theatre	
2010	The Kid	Anne/Others	Off-Broadway - Theatre Row	
2012	Now. Here. This.	Susan	Off-Broadway - Vineyard Theatre	
2018	Gone Missing		Encores! Off-Center	

=== Television ===
Year	Title	Role	Notes
1998	Law & Order	Gabrielle Ruffino	Episode: "Faccia a Faccia"
1999	Law & Order	Erica Castle	Episode: "Disciple"
2000	The Sopranos	Therapist	Episode: "Full Leather Jacket"
2000	Third Watch	Plainclothes Cop #2	Episode: "Four Days"
2002	Law & Order: Criminal Intent	Joan Rhoden	Episode: "Art"
2002	Law & Order	Lydia Fernands	Episode: "DR 1-102"
2008	Law & Order	Judge Agnes Reisman	Episode: "Called Home"
2008-09	The Battery's Down	Davina Spence	3 episodes
2009	Law & Order: Criminal Intent	Amy's Assistant	Episode: "Alpha Dog"
2009	The Good Wife	Professor Joile	Episode: "Conjugal"
2011	The Onion News Network	Carol	Episode: "Exposed, Brooke Alvarez"
2013	Person of Interest	Principal Lawton	Episode: "2 Pi R"
2013	Smash	Stella Stewart	Episode: "The Tonys"
2014	Unforgettable	Deputy Mayor Kezirian	Episode: "Omega Hour"
2014	Dangerous Liaisons	Maggie Roth	TV movie
2015	Master of None	Lucy	Episode: "Indians on TV"
2016	The Characters	Todd's Mom	Episode: "Lauren Lapkus"
2016	Difficult People	Game Show Host	Episode: "Kessler Epstein Foundation"
2016	The Night Of	Drug Intoxication Expert	Episode: "Samson and Delilah"
2016	Odd Mom Out		Episode: "40 Is the New 70"
2016	Younger	Amy	Episode: "A Book Fair to Remember"
2017	The Blacklist	Judge Drucker	2 episodes
2018	Succession	Stephanie	Episode: "Sad Sack Wasp Trap"
2018	Madam Secretary	Lorraine Sheridan	Episode: "Ghosts"
2018	Ray Donovan	Camila Jones	2 episodes
2019	The Other Two	Casting Director	Episode: "Pilot"
2022	Billions	Kristy	Season 6 regular

=== Film ===
Year	Title	Role	Notes
1995	The Living	Susan	Short film
2002	Changing Lanes	Newsroom Producer	
2003	Bun-Bun	Mother	Short film
2007	Margot at the Wedding	Woman on Train	
2007	P.S. I Love You	Vicky	
2011	Margin Call	Lauren Bratberg	
2014	Birdman	Intermission Woman	
2014	A Most Violent Year	Female Radio Reporter	Voice role
2015	3 Generations	Real Estate Agent	
2016	Norman	Female Board Member	
2016	The Comedian	Arlene	
2017	The Post	Dinner Wife	
2019	After the Wedding	Gwen	
2019	Yes, God, Yes	Gina	
2019	Auggie	Anne	
2020	Before/During/After	Erin	
