= Gary Miller (conductor) =

American conductor

Gary Miller (born 1946) is an American conductor, gay activist, and educator. Raised in York, Pennsylvania, he graduated from Lebanon Valley College with a Bachelor of Music Education and from the University of Michigan with a Master of Music in choral conducting.

In August 1980 he played a pivotal role in founding the New York City Gay Men's Chorus (NYCGMC). Miller served as the NYCGMC's first music director from 1980 to 1998, later returning as director for one season in 2005. Under his baton, the chorus performed more than 50 concerts in Carnegie Hall and completed three European tours.

== Accomplishments ==
Under Miller's leadership the NYCGMC operated not only as a musical ensemble but as a political and social organization. In a 1998 interview in The New York Times Miller said of the chorus, "As gay men we wanted to make music for the education and enrichment of the community. It was to be equal parts music, social and political."

In 1984 the chorus performed at the Eastern Division Conference of the American Choral Directors Association (ACDA). It was the first time that the ACDA had featured a gay chorus at one of its conventions. The ACDA had initially refused to allow the chorus to use the word "gay" in their printed program, a decision that prompted Miller to file a successful lawsuit against the organization with the backing of the American Civil Liberties Union.

During his tenure the chorus notably became the first gay musical ensemble to receive a recording contract. Over the years Miller commissioned 40 new choral works by numerous notable American composers. He also led the chorus in several AIDS benefits which helped to raise awareness of the disease as well as to bring in funding for medical research.
