= Other World (musical) =

2020 musical

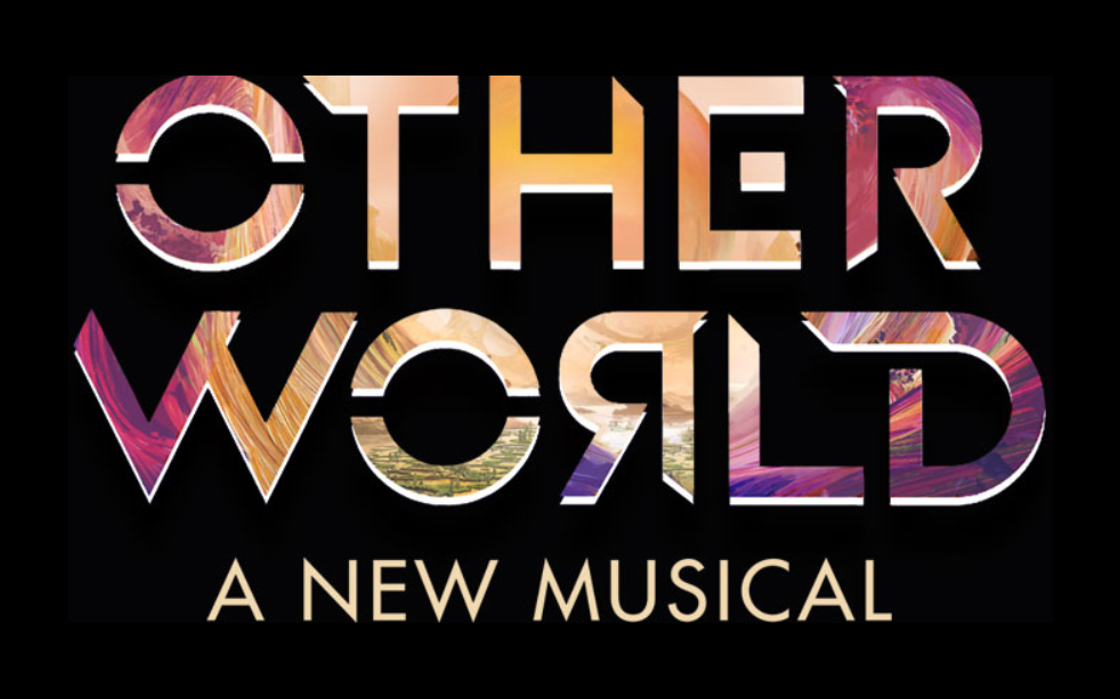
- Music: Jeff Bowen; Ann McNamee
- Lyrics: Jeff Bowen; Ann McNamee
- Book: Hunter Bell
- Productions: 2020 Bucks County Playhouse; 2022 Delaware Theatre Company

Other World is an original American musical theatre production based on an imagined MMORPG video game, with the book by Hunter Bell and music and lyrics by Jeff Bowen and Ann McNamee respectively. In addition to a plot that centers around video games, the show explores the connections made on- and off-line, including family both biological and chosen, with the help of live special effects including puppetry.

== History and productions ==
By the time Other World held its first preview at Bucks County Playhouse on 13 March 2020, it had been in the works for over eight years, and had participated in the New York Theatre Barn's New Works Series Live in June, 2021.

Other World began its world premiere theatre engagement at Delaware Theatre Company in February 2022, with performances through March 2022. The production featured a double turntable stage, a full-stage LED projection wall, art direction by Rebekah Tisch and Wētā Workshop and puppetry by the puppeteers behind the War Horse (film), AchesonWalsh Studios. Co-protagonists Sri and Lorraine were played by Jamen Nanthakumar and Bonnie Milligan respectively. The lead character inside the game, Temula, was played by Charnette Batey. Directed by Adrienne Campbell-Holt, the cast reflected the real world with actors and dancers of varied mobilities, with Karla Puno Garcia’s choreography/rattan stick choreography incorporating these differences. The production won Best New Play or Musical at the Broadway World Awards for Delaware 2022. Invite-only staged readings were held on Thursday, March 16 and Friday, March 17, 2023 at Open Jar Studios in New York City. The Delaware Theatre Company has announced Other World as a part of their 2026 - 2027 season with performances running from 17 February, 2027 - 7 March, 2027.

== Synopsis ==
The production begins with online gamer Sri, and non-gamer Lorraine, in a garage on Earth. Next thing they know, they're transported through a portal into Sri's favorite video game, Other World. As the game becomes visible to the audience, they see Sri and Lorraine trapped within the game where they will need to work together and discover inner strengths in order to survive and find their way home. Along the way they'll interact with other gamers and avatars as they race against the clock to save themselves.

== Collaboration with Wētā Workshop ==
Usually producing effects for theatre and film, New Zealand-based five time Academy Award winner, Wētā Workshop, made its American theatrical debut with Other World with the Workshop's Rebekah Tisch serving as the art director. Tisch and her team developed Other World to be a complete, albeit fictional game. Rather than coding it, they created a virtual world for live stage. The creation of the game was an integral part of the development of Other World from the beginning, with project collaborator Ann McNamee approaching the Workshop nearly 10 years ago for creative ideas. According to Workshop designer Tisch who was involved with the project from the start, "It's possibly a first of its kind, a game that's not actually a game.”

== Comic book series ==
During New York Comic Con in November 2023 it was announced that Other World has been transformed into a comic book series featuring a script adaptation and layouts by D. McFadzean, editorial consultation and color assistance by Caitlin Leonard, and pencils, inks, and colors by Keny Widjaja. An exhibition entitled ‘Stage to Page’ was held at the Haight Street Art Center in May, 2024.
