= Title of show =

Musical by Jeff Bowen and Hunter Bell

[title of show]
- Music: Jeff Bowen
- Lyrics: Jeff Bowen
- Book: Hunter Bell
- Basis: The story of its own creation
- Productions: 2006 Off-Broadway; 2008 Broadway; 2010 Melbourne; 2010 Sydney; 2017 Berlin; 2017 Buenos Aires; 2018 Hamburg; 2018 Auckland; 2019 Auckland; 2022 San Diego; 2022 Munich; 2024 Off-West End
- Awards: 2006 Obie Award Special Citations; 2009 Broadway.com Audience Award Favorite Ensemble Cast

[title of show] is a one-act musical, with music and lyrics by Jeff Bowen and a book by Hunter Bell. The show chronicles its own creation as an entry in the New York Musical Theatre Festival, and follows the struggles of the author and composer/lyricist and their two actress friends during the initial brief (three-week) creative period, along with subsequent events leading up to the show's production.

[title of show] was chosen for production by the Musical Theatre Festival and premiered there, in September 2004, in New York City. It later ran off-Broadway at the Vineyard Theatre in 2006, earning a second limited run the same year, then played at Broadway's Lyceum Theatre in 2008 for 13 previews and 102 regular performances. Writer/stars Bowen and Bell, as well as director Michael Berresse all won Obie Awards for their work on the off-Broadway production, and Bell was nominated for a Tony Award for Best Book of a Musical.

The musical spawned a recurring video blog about the show's journey to Broadway called The [title of show] Show.

== History and productions ==
[title of show] was conceived by friends Bowen and Bell during the spring of 2004 after Bell received an announcement for the inaugural New York Musical Theatre Festival. With the deadline just three weeks away, Bell began drafting the script with Bowen writing the lyrics and music. Due to the severe time constraints, and because the Festival required only the submission of a script plus four songs, Bowen wrote most lyrics without any accompanying melody, planning to finish the songs later. Nevertheless, many of these lyrics have remained intact through several incarnations and revisions to the show.

Bowen and Bell, determined to write an original musical rather than adapt an existing play or movie, discovered almost immediately that their conversations about what to write were more interesting than what they were actually writing. As the idea to document the creation of the show itself ("a musical about two guys writing a musical about two guys writing a musical") became clearer, Bell and Bowen expanded the script based on their writing experiences with friends Susan Blackwell and Heidi Blickenstaff. [title of show] has since become a post-modern work-in-progress, with updates and changes to each new production reflecting the circumstances the cast and the show have experienced. Larry Pressgrove was the musical director and orchestrator in all productions through 2008.

=== Early performances ===
The first three performances of [title of show], at the Manhattan Theatre Source in the summer of 2004, were produced by Laura Camien. The cast included Bowen, Bell, Blackwell, and Stacia Fernandez, playing the role of "Stacia". Bowen and Bell convinced several Broadway stars to participate in a recurring plot device by leaving recorded phone messages rejecting offers to star in the show. Messages featured in the Theatre Source and Festival performances included Idina Menzel, Marin Mazzie, Sutton Foster and Emily Skinner.

The production premiered at the 2004 New York Musical Theatre Festival on September 22, 2004 (also produced by Camien), at the Belt Theatre, and ran for six performances as scheduled. Heidi Blickenstaff replaced Fernandez, who had accepted the understudy role to Beth Leavel in the Broadway production of The Drowsy Chaperone. While her character's name remained "Stacia" for the Festival performances, thereafter it became "Heidi", and the role was modified to reflect Blickenstaff's experiences while helping to expand and evolve the show.

A year of expansion and revision followed. Kevin McCollum agreed to produce [title of show] for professional presentation after seeing it performed at the Festival. Five new songs were added: "Monkeys and Playbills", "What Kind of Girl is She?", "Festival Medley/September Song", "Secondary Characters" and "Nine People's Favorite Thing". "The Wall", originally sung by Jeff and Stacia at the Festival, was rewritten as a solo for Heidi with new lyrics, and a new name, "A Way Back to Then." Changes to the book included the addition of the conflict between Susan and Heidi (as introduced by "What Kind of Girl Is She?") and the combined music and scenes "Awkward Photo Shoot" and "Change It, Don't Change It." Both reflected the tension among the cast members that had begun to set in since the Festival's performance and their uncertainty about an off-Broadway run.

After several performances at the Eugene O'Neill Theater Center in Waterford, CT, six off-off Broadway performances were staged at Ars Nova in New York City in September 2005. Phone messages in the Ars Nova production were left by Marin Mazzie and Emily Skinner again, with new messages from Amy Spanger and Victoria Clark. The success of these performances led to an offer by the Vineyard Theatre of a limited off-Broadway run.

=== Off-Broadway ===
[title of show] was performed at the Vineyard Theatre from February 26, 2006 to April 24, 2006 as part of the theatre's regular season line-up, followed by an extension of the production from July 14, 2006 through October 1, 2006. Christine Ebersole lent her voice to one of the phone messages. The production won three Obie Award Special Citations for its writer/stars and director.

A performance was scheduled to play in San Francisco in 2008 but was canceled because of time constraints in moving the show to Broadway by July 2008. The show's transfer to Broadway is chronicled in "the [title of show] show" video blogs on YouTube and on the show's official web site.

=== Broadway ===
The musical began previews on Broadway at the Lyceum Theatre on July 5, 2008 and officially opened on July 17. It closed October 12, 2008 after 13 previews and 102 performances. It was produced by McCollum, Roy Miller (producer of The Drowsy Chaperone), The Vineyard Theatre, Laura Camien and Kris Stewart, the founder of the New York Musical Theatre Festival. Lighting design by Ken Billington.

The entire off-Broadway cast continued in the same roles, and Berresse continued as director. Added to the list of phone messages in the Broadway production was the voice of Patti LuPone. Scenic design was by Neil Patel, costumes by Chase Tyler and lighting by Ken Billington and Jason Kantrowitz. The show won a 2009 Broadway.com Audience Award for Favorite Ensemble Cast.

=== UK ===
The UK premiere opened in London at the Landor Theatre in August, 2013 starring Scott Garnham as Hunter, Simon Bailey as Jeff, Sarah Galbraith as Susan and Sophia Ragavelas as Heidi.

=== Germany ===
The German-language premiere was presented at the Admiralspalast, Berlin in April 2017. The production starred Dennis Weißert (Hunter), Alexander Soehnle (Jeff), Annika Henz (Heidi), Franziska Kuropka (Susan) and Damian Omansen (Larry). The creative team included Damian Omansen (musical direction), Silvia Varelli (choreography and musical staging), Daniel Unger (design), Jonathan Richter (sound) and Martin Siemann (light). The show was directed by Robin Kulisch who also provided the official German translation.

The production also played Hamburg (at the Schmidtchen, April and November 2018) and Munich (WERK7 theater, May and October 2022). For the Hamburg run, Benjamin Sommerfeld joined the cast as Hunter. In Munich, Robin Reitsma joined the cast as Jeff.

=== Regional productions ===
Several regional productions have been staged, starting in January 2010 in St. Louis, Missouri. The Los Angeles premiere production ran from July 16, 2010 to September 11, 2010, at the Celebration Theatre with Jennifer R. Blake, Carey Peters, Jeffrey Landman, Micah McCain, and Gregory Nabours, for which Jennifer R. Blake won Outstanding Performance by a Lead Actress in a Musical for the role of Susan from StagesceneLA's Best of LA Theatre Awards 2009-2010 A production ran from November 16, 2010 to December 12, 2010 at the George Street Playhouse, New Brunswick, New Jersey, with Seth Rudetsky, Tyler Maynard, Lauren Kennedy and Susan Mosher. A production by Forte Musical Theatre Guild in Calgary ran from May 24 to June 4, 2011, directed by: Glenda Stirling

=== Other notable professional productions ===
The Interlochen Arts Academy presented the musical in October 2012. With the help of two of the show's creators, Jeff Bowen and Hunter Bell, an expanded ensemble was added to the production. This production was toured to New York for a weekend run at the Helen Mills Theater. A Danish production opened January 31, 2013, in Fredericia, 200 km west of Copenhagen. It was directed by Victoria Bussert and stars Lars Mølsted as Henrik (Hunter), Thomas Jensen as Jeff, Bjørg Gamst as Heidi, Maria Skuladottir as Susan and Thomas Møller as Lars (Larry). Danish translation by Thomas Bay and Mads Nielsen. The show was first seen at the Edinburgh Fringe Festival in August 2013, starring Carley Stenson as Susan, Robbie Towns as Jeff, Ricky Johnston as Hunter, and Jamie Lee Pike as Heidi. Other foreign productions include Hong Kong (2015).

=== London Coliseum pro-shot ===
In 2020, amidst the COVID-19 pandemic, a pro-shot of the musical was released on the streaming service BroadwayHD. This production starred Tyrone Huntley as Hunter, Marc Elliott as Jeff, Lucie Jones as Heidi, Jenna Russell as Susan, and Ben Ferguson as Larry. The production was directed by Josh Seymour and received positive reviews, gaining a 4 1/2 star average on Letterboxd.

=== Off West-End run ===
In July 2024, [title of show] played the Phoenix Arts Club for a limited run of 4 performances. It starred George Crawford as Hunter, Abbie Budden as Heidi, Mary Moore as Susan and Thomas Oxley as Jeff. It was then announced that the production would transfer to Southwark Playhouse, adding Jacob Fowler as Hunter to the cast. Taylor Jay produced these iterations for Taylor Jay Productions.

== Original cast ==
The cast for the New York Musical Theatre Festival, off-Broadway, Broadway, and national tour productions has remained the same:

- Jeff Bowen – Jeff
- Heidi Blickenstaff – Heidi
- Susan Blackwell – Susan
- Hunter Bell – Hunter

Larry Pressgrove, the arranger and musical director, has a minor speaking role as himself ("Larry") while playing musical accompaniment at an on-stage keyboard.

The show also features recorded vocal cameo appearances by several well-known Broadway actors, playing themselves: Kerry Butler, Marin Mazzie, Victoria Clark, Christine Ebersole, Sutton Foster, Patti LuPone, and Emily Skinner.

Standbys for both the original off-Broadway and Broadway productions were Courtney Balan and Benjamin Howes.

== Notable casts ==
Character	NYMTF	Off-Broadway	Broadway	Melbourne	Sydney	UK	Berlin	Hamburg	London Coliseum	San Diego	Munich	Off West-End
Character	2004	2006	2008	2010	2010	2013	2017	2018	2020	2022	2022	2024
Hunter	Hunter Bell	Hunter Bell	Hunter Bell	Michael Lindner	Jay James-Moody	Scott Garnham	Dennis Weißert	Benjamin Sommerfeld	Tyrone Huntley	Lindsay Carmichael	Benjamin Sommerfeld	Jacob Fowler
Jeff	Jeff Bowen	Jeff Bowen	Jeff Bowen	David Spencer	Blake Erickson	Simon Bailey	Alexander Soehnle	Alexander Soehnle	Marc Elliott	Jordan Sisco	Robin Reitsma	Thomas Oxley
Heidi	Heidi Blickenstaff	Heidi Blickenstaff	Heidi Blickenstaff	Lara Thew	Lizzie Moore	Sophia Ragavelas	Annika Henz	Annika Henz	Lucie Jones	Madeline Oakley	Annika Henz	Abbie Budden
Susan	Susan Blackwell	Susan Blackwell	Susan Blackwell	Laura Fitzpatrick	Keira Daley	Sarah Galbraith	Franziska Kuropka	Franziska Kuropka	Jenna Russell	Ryanne Parker	Franziska Kuropka	Mary Moore
Larry	Larry Pressgrove	Larry Pressgrove	Larry Pressgrove	Sophie Thomas	Paul Geddes	Michael Webborn	Damian Omansen	Damian Omansen	Ben Ferguson	Aurora Grzybek	Damian Omansen	Tom Chippendale

== Synopsis ==
The show opens with a musical number introducing the premise of the musical ("Untitled Opening Number"). Jeff and Hunter, two struggling writers in New York, discuss the possibility of entering the upcoming inaugural New York Musical Theatre Festival. Though the submission deadline is only three weeks away, they make a pact to write an original musical in that time as a writing exercise. The scene morphs into song as they discuss setting their dialogue to music, imagine the success of their show, and express their longing for fame and recognition ("Two Nobodies In New York").

The two recruit their friends Susan and Heidi to help with the project. Jeff privately laments his writer's block; when his blank writing pad begins to look like Hunter, ideas begin to flow ("An Original Musical"). After Hunter's laptop crashes, resulting in much lost progress, Jeff and Hunter continue to battle writer's block by looking at song lists from old Playbills and brainstorming on a blank notepad; Susan and Heidi become voices in their heads, providing inspiration for their writing ("Monkeys and Playbills"). As they continue to write the show, excitement mounts; Hunter even ponders winning a Tony ("The Tony Award Song"), though Jeff reminds him that they have already cut the song he is in the midst of singing. Jeff and Hunter discuss their ambition to write for a living and become a part of the theatre industry they so admire ("Part of It All").

As Heidi and Jeff work on a solo about her doubts on the whole project, Hunter and Susan worry that they are just stringing sketches and novelty songs together and feel that they need to write something "a little meatier" ("I Am Playing Me"). Susan and Heidi become suspicious of each other ("What Kind Of Girl Is She?"). After a shared 'fake foggy dream sequence', the four express their doubts over the future and premise of their musical. Susan encourages them to keep going and 'kill their vampires', or the doubts preventing them from writing ("Die, Vampire, Die!"). Reenergized, they finish the show and, after discussing the show's production values (minimalistic set of four chairs, one costume throughout the show, etc.), they tackle the festival's submission paperwork. Seeing the form asking for their "title of show" and lacking a better name, they decide to name their show [title of show] . ("Filling Out The Form"). After a moment of doubt and a brief intimate moment between Hunter and Jeff, they finally submit the show to the festival.

Against the odds, their musical is chosen for the festival. The four revel in their six performances at the festival ("Montage Part 1: September Song"); backstage, Heidi and Susan reconcile their differences and bond over their supporting roles in the show ("Secondary Characters"). The four find an industry producer interested in the show who encourages them to continue to develop it, first at the Eugene O'Neill Theater Center before they get an offer to do the show Off-Broadway at the Vineyard Theatre. At their run there, they meet many industry stars, receiving a healthy mix of good and bad reviews as they soak up the energy and momentum of their Off-Broadway run.

Ten months later, Susan, Jeff, and Hunter are back at their 'day jobs' while Heidi receives an offer to join the cast of The Little Mermaid on Broadway. Hunter comes up with the idea of posting videos on the internet with the cast about the show to boost the show's popularity online — "the [title of show] show". The idea works — the show and the four go viral and the show's producer expresses interest in actually bringing the show to Broadway.

As plans progress toward taking the musical to Broadway, things begin to unravel: the four friends argue over changes to the show to make it more marketable, cutting some of its more risque content ("Change It/Don't Change It"). Hunter gets a voicemail from Sutton Foster and, much to Jeff's chagrin, suggests casting her in Heidi's role for marketability. Tensions build — everything finally boils over at a publicity photo shoot ("Awkward Photo Shoot"). Heidi is upset that Hunter wants to replace her, Susan laments the time-consuming nature of the show's development and is concerned about profit-sharing, Jeff is upset at Hunter for pushing hard for changes that wound the integrity of the show, and Larry (the accompanist) feels left out of the press photos and interviews. Hunter lashes out at all of them and leaves in a huff.

Later, Hunter breaks the ice by apologizing. More apologies follow, and the four (led by Heidi) wax nostalgic over younger, happier, less complicated days ("A Way Back To Then"). They now understand that the show must sink or swim as it is — with the five of them, without a "bankable" star — because their relationship and the quality of their creation are more important to them than commercial success ("Nine People's Favorite Thing"). Having reached a resolution, they decide to end the show, to "put the show out there and see what happens" ("Finale").

== Musical numbers ==
The following musical numbers were present in the Broadway version of the show, its 'final iteration' and the version currently available for licensing.

- "Untitled Opening Number" (Company)
- "Two Nobodies in New York" (Jeff, Hunter)
- "An Original Musical" (Jeff, Blank Paper)
- "Monkeys and Playbills" (Company)
- "The Tony Award Song" (Jeff, Hunter)
- "Part of It All" (Jeff, Hunter)
- "I Am Playing Me" (Heidi, others)
- "What Kind of Girl Is She?" (Heidi, Susan)
- "Die, Vampire, Die!" (Susan, others)
- "Filling Out the Form" (Company)
- "Montage Part 1: September Song" (Company)
- "Montage Part 2: Secondary Characters" (Heidi, Susan)
- "Montage Part 3: Development Medley" (Company)
- "Change It, Don't Change It/Awkward Photo Shoot" (Company)
- "A Way Back to Then" (Heidi)
- "Nine People's Favorite Thing" (Company)
- "Finale" (Company)

=== Cast recording ===
In 2006, Ghostlight Records released a studio cast recording for the (then Off-Broadway) show. This earlier version of the show, while largely the same and possessing largely the same music numbers as above, has various differences, most notably:

- No musical bridges in "What Kind of Girl Is She?" and "Part of It All" (both songs were revised for the Broadway version of the show)
- Shorter ending verse in "An Original Musical"
- No "Development Medley" (hadn't been written yet; only present in the Broadway version)
- No "Change It, Don't Change It" and "Awkward Photo Shoot"

In addition to various minor lyric, melody, harmony, etc. changes.

Furthermore, two bonus tracks were included on the recording:

- "[title of show]" (Company)
- "Ground Beef In A Cup" (Heidi, with Susan). This song was included in early versions of the show, but the melody became "What Kind of Girl Is She?" It is a hidden track, combined into one track with [title of show] on the online download of the album, and after 15 second of silence on the cast album.

=== Further Changes ===
For the 2024 Off-West End run, "An Original Musical" was cut.

== The [title of show] show ==
Cheyenne Jackson (center) on the [title of show] show with Hunter Bell (left) and Jeff Bowen (right)

The [title of show] show is a video blog by the creators of [title of show]. It documents the musical's progress to Broadway. Guest actors Barrett Foa, Sean Palmer, Sierra Boggess, Lin-Manuel Miranda, Kerry Butler, Lea Michele, Gideon Glick, Jonathan Groff, Ann Harada, director of [title of show] Michael Berresse and Cheyenne Jackson appear on The [title of show] show.

=== Episodes ===
The titles of the show's episodes reflect the original cast recording track listing.

==== Episode 1: Untitled Pilot Episode ====
Jeff and Hunter, appearing largely in character, excitedly announce that [title of show] is going to Broadway. This episode sets the precedent for future episodes; Jeff wears his costume from the original off-Broadway production and Hunter wears a promotional shirt from a random Broadway show. The episode chronicles the creation of the [title of show] show and includes clips of Jeff composing the show's musical theme at the piano.

==== Episode 2: Two Nobodies Look For a Theatre ====
Split into two parts, Jeff and Hunter begin searching for a Broadway theatre and Jeff creates the [TOS]ability Board. Susan checks in from her dressing room on the set of Law & Order, her first appearance on the show after performing an unprepared search for a theater on foot in Shubert Alley. Upon returning to the apartment, Heidi messages Hunter and Jeff on iChat and recommends that the group perform out of town before mounting a Broadway production.

This episode introduced the duct tape motif of [title of show] publicity and the first playing of the opening sequence Jeff began composing in Episode 1.

==== Episode 3: It's an Original Musical ====
This episode begins in the tradition of the [title of show]'s self-aware nature and immediately exposes the back stage conversations of the actors after filming Episode 2.

Hunter and Jeff begin to wonder if people will understand what [title of show] is. Susan, who has apparently been in the room during the filming of Episode 2, has prepared a comedic video spoof of a 1980s instructional video that explains the show's concept. Larry Pressgrove appears for the first time as Constantine, a co-worker in Jim and Barry's office.

The instructional video is interrupted so Jeff can update the [TOS]ability Board. Also, Jeff introduces his [title of show] Showcial Network Chart which records the status of [title of show] on Broadwayworld.com's Showcial Network. Hunter introduces his own chart called "Hunter's Chart of Jeff's Charts."

==== Episode 4: There's a Monkey in My Playbill ====
Hunter and Jeff begin perusing a gift bag from "Broadway on Broadway" and decide to attend the annual Broadway flea market. While Jeff shows his new Playbills to Susan, Heidi arrives at the apartment. After a quick joyous reunion, the group decides to hit the town "Heidi-Style." During a montage of the day, Jeff updates the [TOS]ability Board. After a long day, Jeff, Hunter, Heidi and Susan relax and imagine how [title of show] could play in different US cities in a series of television show spoofs. Jeff is seen without his costume for the first time.

==== Episode 5: Part of It All ====
In the writers' room, Hunter, Jeff, Heidi, Susan and Larry sit around a table and discuss what Episode 5 will be about. As a running joke, every time the city [title of show] will play in is said, a sound effect blocks it out. The team decide that parodies are the best ways to create exposure for [title of show]. The discussion is interrupted by Jeff who updates the Showcial Network Chart and by Hunter parodying the YouTube video Leave Britney Alone. Jeff interrupts his own sequence to update the [TOS]ability Board and is again interrupted by Hunter who parodies the YouTube video of Miss Teen South Carolina.

Heidi enters the scene and accidentally mentions that the out of town trial will take place in San Francisco. Susan then confesses to the audience that because no arrangements have been finalized, the city the out of town tryout had not yet been revealed. This episode has brief cameos from actors Sean Palmer and Barrett Foa.

==== Episode 6: We Are Playing We ====
Hunter and Jeff consider that should [title of show] become a Broadway hit, they would need to cast replacements for the original cast upon on whom the characters in the show are based.

A musical sequence begins in which many Broadway actors sing a refrain from the show. Several actors play Hunter and Jeff in brief sequences that interrupt the musical number. Jeff introduces his new chart, Jeff's Playbill Needs, which lists Playbills he needs for his collection. Hunter, played by Ann Harada interrupts to add this chart to Hunter's Chart of Jeff's Charts.

The episode includes a very brief closing cameo from Nathan Lane and David Hyde Pierce.

==== Episode 7: What Kind of Show is She? ====
After agreeing there should be no more cameos via telephone, Hunter and Jeff prepare to meet at a planned press conference. Hunter has the responsibility of telling Cheyenne Jackson that he is no longer in the show. Jackson, enraged, exits the room.

Heidi and Susan begin a fake press conference that parodies the news crawl and logo of CNN. Jeff arrives late to the conference and announces there will be no pre-Broadway tryout and the show will be sent directly to Broadway.

Back in the apartment, Jeff and Hunter draw attention to the fact that they have implied the out of town tryout would be in San Francisco, which was canceled due to timing issues. Jeff updates the [TOS]ability Board and notes that every Broadway theatre is booked for the season but they still hope to perform on Broadway in spring 2008. Due to copyright infringement, the sound was turned off by YouTube. It was re-uploaded on February 23, 2010, with sound. The video without sound is still on the show's channel.

==== Episode 8: It's Time Vampire, It's Time ====
This episode features no introduction although the show's theme is played at the beginning. It begins with the end credits from the end to the beginning. A baton relay race is held by the cast of [title of show] involving a mysterious package that has been delivered to Jeff. Over twenty minutes earlier, Susan hands the package to Jeff who runs through Times Square to the Lyceum Theatre or The Producing Office to view its contents. Over thirty minutes earlier, Mindy gives Susan the package who runs to give it to Jeff, but on the way is attacked by ninjas. After a fierce battle, Susan defeats them and finds that one is Spring Awakening star Jonathan Groff. After finding that Groff cannot get her tickets, she kills him and finishes her trip in a restaurant where she eats and forgets to give Jeff the package. Nearly 40 minutes earlier, Larry gives Mindy singing lessons for a back-up vocal part in "Die, Vampire, Die" when a dog, Olive, gives him the package which he immediately gives to Mindy for delivery. Mindy runs through New York where she collides with Cheyenne Jackson. Avoiding Jackson, Mindy delivers the package to Susan. One hour earlier, Heidi sits in her dressing room preparing for a performance of The Little Mermaid. Hunter arrives out of breath and gives Heidi the package which she ties onto Olive's collar. Olive runs down the sidewalk to Larry's apartment building where she meets John Tartaglia in the elevator. Not caring what Tartaglia has to say, Olive leaves the elevator and delivers the package to Larry. Thirty-five minutes earlier, Hunter sits at his breakfast table when he suddenly gets dressed and retrieves the package from a shoe-box in his kitchen. He runs into midtown New York City passing actor Barrett Foa on the way to Heidi's dressing room. Twenty minutes earlier, Hunter stretches outside his apartment building and brings in a newspaper. While reading the newspaper, Hunter sees that the New York Times has announced [title of show] is going to Broadway. He retrieves the shoe-box which is labeled "in case of [broadway] open." The entire sequence of events is played forwards very quickly and Jeff opens the package which contains the [title of show] sticker for his [TOS]ability board. The cast gathers around to see that the show will be playing at the Lyceum Theatre beginning on July 5. The closing credits announce the dates and ticket availability for the Broadway production and asks the viewer to "tell 9 people" in a reference to the song "Nine People's Favorite Thing." The episode was later re-uploaded, although the original video is still on their channel.

==== Episode 9: Fillin' Out the Frrrrm ====
Jeff is working in his kitchen preparing for Broadway when Hunter calls him. They tease one another about their success. They discuss American Idol and realize they have yet to film a new episode of The [title of show] show. Hunter reminds Jeff that they have already agreed to produce thirteen episodes despite Jeff's criticisms.

Hunter and Jeff explain what the cast has been doing since the debut of Episode 8. The cast have been rehearsing, hosting the Drama Desk Awards and modeling in promotional photography sessions. Hunter jokes that the show has already won Tony Awards although it has not yet opened on Broadway. Jeff and Hunter then teleport to the Lyceum Theatre where the new marquee for the show is being hung over the street. Larry, Susan and Heidi are summoned to 45th street. When they try to enter the theater they realize they are locked out as the Broadway revival of Macbeth is still striking. The group returns to the apartment where they continue to plan for the upcoming Broadway production. They graciously thank their fans for their support over the past four years.

==== Episode 10: Julyceum Song ====
The cast talks about their experience on the "Great White Way". Many stars come and ask for Mindy... Mindy Gets Shot!

=== Season 2 ===
==== Episode 1: The [title of show] Show “Who Shot Mindy” Christmas Spectacular Show Special Show ====
The show opens with Jeff Bowen and Hunter Bell outside Mindy's hospital room. A doctor comes out and tells them that she has just emerged from a 5-month coma. The show becomes a holiday special, featuring many of the guests in Episode 10, including Cheyenne Jackson, who is here to "finish the job".

==== Episode 2: What If This Show? ====
The show reveals that it was not Cheyenne Jackson who shot Mindy but Allison Janney. The Tony Award Season special begins. Jeff unveils a new chart of which musicals are eligible for Tony Awards.

=== Specials ===
==== The [title of show] Show Christmas Show ====
Hunter, Susan, Heidi and Jeff reminisce and celebrate the Christmas spirit. This episode introduced the puppets Grampa and Mindy played by Paul McGinnis and Matt Vogel respectively. Further, Cheyenne Jackson makes his first of several appearances on the show. Rather than focusing on mounting [title of show] on Broadway, the show is a series of comedic skits and musical numbers. This includes the puppets getting drunk, references to old-fashioned Christmas specials and an original claymation. Hunter and Jeff thank the fans for their continuing support and wish their viewers a merry Christmas.

==== Extra: Snake Eats Tail ====
This episode begins with a series of telephone calls between Hunter and Jeff and explains what is termed the "snakeeatstailness" of [title of show], or how the show chronicles its own creation and encompasses a cyclical pattern explained as ouroboros, a Greek term for this pattern. The video links to additional videos on the [title of show] website and features guest actors.

==== [tos]timonials ====
The [title of show] show: Extra Testimonials are video reviews by viewers of [title of show]'s Broadway production.

==== 9pft ====
In this music video, set to the song "Nine People's Favorite Thing" (from [title of show]), 600 fans were assigned one line each from the song through e-mail, and instructed to e-mail a picture of themselves illustrating the lyric. The final video contains every picture, in lyrical order, as the song plays. The fans include everyday people and celebrities Patti LuPone, Joel Grey, Betty Buckley, John Kander, Jonathan Groff, Neil Patrick Harris, Jane Krakowski, America Ferrera, actor/siblings Celia, Maggie, and Andrew Keenan-Bolger, and others.

==== The [title of show] Show Vineyard Theatre Virtual Variety Show Show! ====
The original cast of [title of show] reunited for a special livestreamed variety show on May 30, 2020 to raise funds for The Campaign for Right Now. They were joined by special guests Bill Irwin, Cheyenne Jackson, Linda Lavin, Leslie Odom Jr., Nicolette Robinson, Steven Pasquale, Phillipa Soo, Zachary Quinto, Brooke Shields, Billy Crudup, and more.

== Major awards and nominations ==
Year	Award	Category	Nominee	Result	Ref
2006	Obie Award	Special Citations	Hunter Bell, Michael Berresse and Jeff Bowen	Won	
2006	Drama League Award	Distinguished Production of a Musical		Nominated	
2006	Drama League Award	Distinguished Performance Award	Ensemble	Nominated	
2007	GLAAD Media Awards	Outstanding New York Theatre: Broadway and Off-Broadway	Hunter Bell and Jeff Bowen	Nominated	
2009	Tony Award	Best Book of a Musical	Hunter Bell	Nominated	
2024	Offie	Supporting Actor in a Musical	Thomas Oxley	Nominated	
2024	Offie	Supporting Actor in a Musical	Jacob Fowler	Nominated	
2024	Offie	Direction (Musical)	Christopher D. Clegg	Nominated	
2024	Offie	Musical Direction	Tom Chippendale	Nominated	
2024	Offie	Best Newcomer	Thomas Oxley	Nominated	

== See also ==
- A Strange Loop
