= Jujamcyn Award =

Theatrical award

Created in 1984, the Jujamcyn Theaters Award has been given over 20+ years to honor a resident theater organization that has made an outstanding contribution to the development of creative talent for the theatre. The award has been sponsored by Jujamcyn Amusement Corporation, one of the three principal organizations involved in Broadway theatre in New York. The award has included a cash prize that has varied from $50,000 to $100,000. The former owner of Jujamcyn, James H. Binger, was a primary sponsor of the award up to his death in 2004. Since his death the award has been given once, rather than the prior pattern of annual awards. Several recipients of the Jujamcyn Award have also been recognized with the Regional Theatre Tony Award. The Jujamcyn Theatres Award recipients have been the following:

Note: this is a sortable table, click on the column heading arrow icon to sort by that column.

Year	Theatre	City	State	References
1984	Eugene O'Neill Theater Center	Waterford	CT	
1985	American Repertory Theater (A.R.T.)	Cambridge	MA	
1986	Long Wharf Theatre	New Haven	CT	
1987	Mark Taper Forum	Los Angeles	CA	
1988	Second Stage Theatre	New York	NY	
1989	The Foundation of the Dramatists Guild Young Playwrights Festival	New York	NY	
1990	Guthrie Theater	Minneapolis	MN	
1991	New York Shakespeare Festival	New York	NY	
1992	Yale School of Drama / Yale Repertory Theatre	New Haven	CT	
1993	The Alliance for New American Musicals	New York	NY	
1994	The Market Theater	Johannesburg	South Africa	
1995	New York Stage and Film Company	New York & Poughkeepsie	NY	
1996	American Conservatory Theater	San Francisco	CA	
1997	Encores!	New York	NY	
1998	Atlantic Theater Company	New York	NY	
1999	Penumbra Theatre Company	St. Paul	MN	
2001	Manhattan Theatre Club	New York	NY	
2002	LAByrinth Theater Company	New York	NY	
2003	Shakespeare's Globe	London	ENGLAND	
2004	New York Musical Theatre Festival	New York	NY	
2007	Irish Repertory Theatre	New York	NY	

== See also ==
- Jujamcyn Amusement Corporation - sponsors of the Jujamcyn award, also owners and operators of theaters in New York City
- Regional Theatre Tony Award - special award given to regional theatres of distinction.
- Regional theater in the United States
