= Michael Berresse =

American actor

- Born: August 15, 1964 (age 61); Holyoke, Massachusetts, U.S.
- Occupations: Actor, dancer, choreographer
- Years active: 1983-present

Michael Berresse (born August 15, 1964) is an American actor, dancer, choreographer, and director.

== Life and career ==
Born in Holyoke, Massachusetts, but reared primarily in Joliet, Illinois, Berresse's father was a chemical engineer and his mother is the artist and author Cynthia Berresse Ploski. He has an older brother and two older sisters. A nationally competitive gymnast and diver from age eight, he went straight from high school to a stint performing in Walt Disney theme parks in Orlando and Tokyo before moving to New York and making his Broadway debut in the 1990 revival of Fiddler on the Roof. In 1992, he appeared on Star Search in a dance group called "The Boys Back East", winning the title of Best New Dance Group and a shared prize of $100,000.

He has appeared on Broadway in many shows including: Kiss Me, Kate, Chicago (first as the murder victim, Fred Casely, and later as the lawyer, Billy Flynn), Fiddler on the Roof, Guys and Dolls, Carousel, Damn Yankees, The Light in the Piazza and most recently as Zach in the revival of A Chorus Line. For his performance as Bill Calhoun in Kiss Me, Kate, Berresse was nominated for a 2000 Tony Award for Best Featured Actor in a Musical as well as London's Olivier Award.

In addition to Broadway, he has worked extensively in regional theatre, most recently in Jason Robert Brown's musical Parade at the Mark Taper Forum in Los Angeles as well as Larry Kramer's The Normal Heart at Arena Stage (Washington, D.C.) He also portrayed Bob Mackie/Robert Altman/Artie in The Cher Show beginning Late 2018 on Broadway.

Berresse was the director and choreographer of the Broadway musical, [title of show] for which he was nominated for a Lucille Lortel Award and a recipient of off-Broadway's Obie Award and which starred and was co-created by his partner Jeff Bowen.

In 2012, he reunited with the [title of show] creative team to direct the off-Broadway musical Now. Here. This. He recently directed the world premiere of Paul Gordon's Analog & Vinyl in summer 2014.

He made his film debut as the Stage Manager in Spielberg's A.I. Artificial Intelligence, played an assassin in State of Play, directed by Kevin Macdonald and starring Russell Crowe, and recently appeared in The Bourne Legacy, with Jeremy Renner. He appeared as himself in the documentary film Every Little Step, which follows the casting process of the production of A Chorus Line in which he starred. In the program for the London run of Kiss Me Kate, which ran from October 2001 to August 2002.

== Filmography ==
Film
Year	Title	Role	Notes
2001	A.I. Artificial Intelligence	Stage Manager	
2008	Meet Dave	A Chorus Line Dancer	
2009	State of Play	Robert Bingham	
2012	The Bourne Legacy	Leonard	
2016	Split	Enki / Tim	
