= Hunter Bell =

American book author and a Broadway star

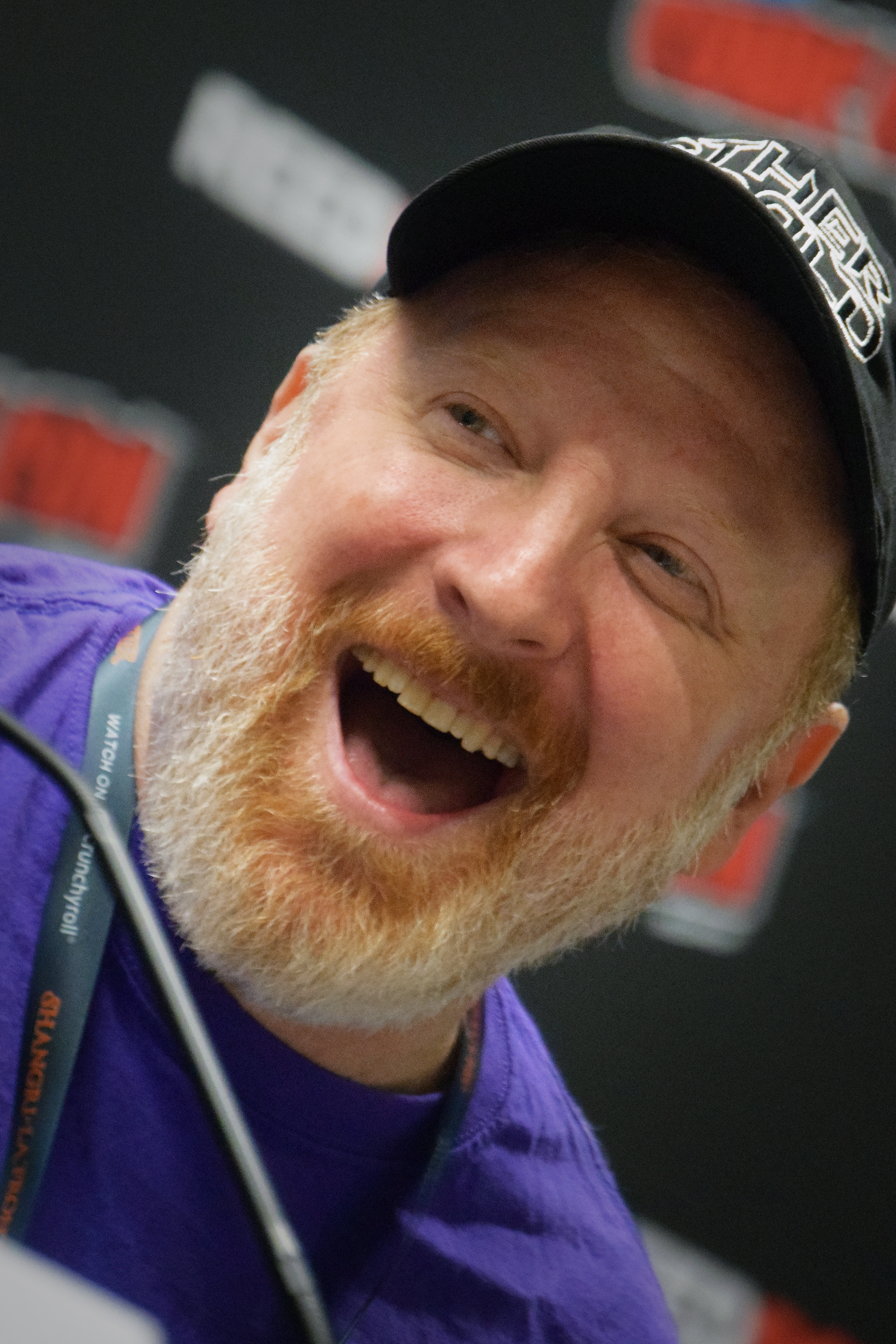
- Born: Hunter Houston Bell; Tuscaloosa, Alabama, U.S.
- Education: Webster University (BFA)
- Occupations: Actor, writer

Hunter Houston Bell is an American writer and theatre actor.

== Early life and education ==
Bell was born in Tuscaloosa, Alabama, and was raised in Wilson, North Carolina until the seventh grade, when he moved to Atlanta, Georgia.

Hunter earned a B.F.A in theatre from the Conservatory of Theatre Arts at Webster University in St. Louis, Missouri.

== Career ==
Bell began his career with smaller regional theater productions. Some notable credits include his appearance in the Ensemble of the 1999 Paper Mill Production of Rags, as a Performer in the Chester, Connecticut 2002 World Premiere production of Actor, Lawyer, Indian Chief, and as George in a 2003 Musicals in Mufti Concert production of Oh, Boy!.

Hunter Bell rose to stardom because of his work on, and appearance in, the musical [title of show], for which he wrote the book, alongside Jeff Bowen, who wrote the music and lyrics. The project first appeared in the New York Musical Theatre Festival in 2004. It opened at The Lyceum Theatre on Broadway on July 17, 2008, and closed on October 12, 2008, at a financial loss.

Prior to the Broadway opening of [title of show], Hunter Bell appeared in two other Broadway productions. The first was as a Dogette in a 2006 benefit concert of The Best Little Whorehouse in Texas, and the second as a citizen of Whoville in the 2007 staging of Dr. Seuss' How the Grinch Stole Christmas!

== Personal life ==
Bell moved to New York City in 1993, and currently resides there.

== Writing credits ==
- Book for Other World
- Book for Now. Here. This. (with Susan Blackwell).
- Book for [title of show]
- Book for Silence! The Musical
- Book for the 137th edition of the Ringling Bros. and Barnum & Bailey Circus, Bellobration!
- Book for "Villains Tonight!" produced on the Disney Cruise Line.

Original Material for:

- BC/EFA's Easter Bonnet competition.
- The Actors' Fund 125th Gala
- The Vineyard Theatre's 25th Anniversary Gala
- Broadway Bares 18: Wonderland
- The 53rd Annual Drama Desk Awards

== Awards and nominations ==
For work on [title of show]:

- 2006 Obie Award—special citation
- GLAAD Media Award nomination
- Drama League Award nomination for the whole cast
- 2009 Tony Award nomination best book of a musical
