= Jeff Bowen =

American composer, lyricist and actor

- Born: August 30, 1971 (age 54); Baltimore, Maryland, U.S.
- Occupations: Composer, lyricist, actor
- Years active: 1993–present

Jeff Bowen (born August 30, 1971) is an American composer, lyricist and actor. He is best known as one of the authors and stars of the Broadway musical [title of show]. Bowen also wrote the music and lyrics to the musical, Now. Here. This. with his [title of show] team: Hunter Bell, Susan Blackwell, Michael Berresse, Heidi Blickenstaff and Larry Pressgrove. The show was staged in June 2012 at The Vineyard Theatre. Bowen is currently working on an original musical, Other World with Hunter Bell and Ann McNamee.

== Writing credits ==
- Music for Sparklefest 2000 at Dixon Place
- Music for Avant-Garde-a-Rama in Sparklevision
- Music for the short film Boat Mime
- Music and additional lyrics for RG: The Musical
- Music and lyrics for the musical [title of show]
- Music and lyrics for BC/EFA's 2007 Easter Bonnet Competition opening number
- Music and lyrics for The Actors' Fund 125th Gala opening number
- Music and lyrics for The Vineyard Theatre's 25th Anniversary Gala ("Twenty-five Years Ago" and "Drive!")
- Music and lyrics for the Broadway Bares 18: Wonderland opening number ("Come Inside My Hole")
- Music and lyrics for the opening number of The 53rd Annual Drama Desk Awards ("We Are Here").
- Music and lyrics for "Villains Tonight!" for the Disney Cruise Line.
- TV Theme Song for the comedy series, Squad 85
- Music and lyrics for Now. Here. This.

== Awards and nominations ==
- 2006 Obie Award for [title of show]
- GLAAD Media Award Nomination for Outstanding New York Theatre: Broadway and Off-Broadway for [title of show]
- Drama League Award Nomination for Distinguished Performance by an Ensemble Cast for [title of show]
- 2008 Jim Owles Liberal Democratic Club Human Rights Award
- Named as one of the top 100 most interesting, influential and newsworthy people in OUT Magazine's 2008 OUT 100 issue
