= New York Musical Theatre Festival =

Defunct musical theatre event

New York Musical Festival
- Location: New York City
- Founded: 2004
- Type of play: Musical
- Website: www.nymf.org

The New York Musical Festival (NYMF) was an annual event held each summer from 2004 to 2019 in New York City's midtown theater district. It mounted more than 30 new musicals each year, more than half selected through an open-submission, double-blind evaluation process involving prominent theater artists and producers. The festival's artist staff invited the remaining shows. NYMF premiered some 447 musicals, engaging more than 8,000 artists and attracting over 300,000 attendees.

More than 100 of these productions were later staged in other venues—in all 50 US states and in 27 countries, reaching an audience of about four million people, by festival officials' count. More than 20 NYMF shows produced cast albums.

== History ==
Besides musicals, the festival offered readings, concerts featuring new music, educational seminars, and explorations of musicals in TV and film.

It also facilitated unique collaborations between New York-based art organizations. In 2011, NYMF launched "NYMF meets NYMIF," a collaboration with the New York Musical Improv Festival. This weekly series paired performers from NYMF with artists from the Magnet Theater to create improvised musicals. Earlier, in 2005, NYMF and the Upright Citizens Brigade Theater explored the intersection of improvisation and musical theater. The festival also collaborated with The Paley Center to screen musicals on television.

In 2005, NYMF received the Jujamcyn Award and its $100,000 prize for developing creative talent. That same year, NYMF introduced a Dance Series to celebrate the integration of musical theatre and dance, featuring the musicals "Common Grounds" (2006) and "Platforms" (2007).

NYMF produced numerous concerts and ran The Next Link Project, a year-round writer service program that provided comprehensive support to help writers develop their musicals into fully staged productions. This initiative culminated annually with subsidized productions for 12 writing teams at NYMF's fall festival.

The festival helped launch Broadway shows. "title of show" became the first NYMF production to transfer to Broadway in 2008, followed by "Next to Normal" in 2009, which won three Tony Awards and the 2010 Pulitzer Prize for Drama. In 2009, NYMF began working with the Daegu International Musical Theatre Festival, facilitating a production exchange and fostering international recognition and accolades.

In 2013, NYMF received a Special Drama Desk Award for a decade-long effort to create and nurture musical theater.

In 2016, "Nerds: A Musical Software Satire" was slated to be NYMF's fourth Broadway transfer, its opening was cancelled due to the loss of a major investor.

NYMF abruptly ceased operations on January 2, 2020.

== NYMF Awards for Excellence ==
At the end of every festival starting in 2006, a jury of Broadway professionals gave awards for excellence to the deserving productions in that year's festival. There was also a "Best of Fest" award that the public votes for.

Year	"Best of Fest" Audience Prize	Most Promising New Musical	Theater for the American Musical Prize	Excellence in Writing (Music)	Excellence in Writing (Lyrics)	Excellence in Writing (Book)	Excellence in Direction	Excellence in Choreography	Excellence in Overall Design	Outstanding Orchestrations	Outstanding Ensemble Performance
2019	Show: Overture Concert: The Oldenburg Suite Reading: Mississippi	Leaving Eden		Buried	Leaving Eden	Buried	Till	Flying Lessons	Leaving Eden		Flying Lessons
2018	Show: An American Hero Concert: Fatty Fatty No Friends Reading: Legacy	Between the Sea and Sky		Between the Sea and Sky	Interstate	Peter, Who?	Between the Sea and Sky	Emojiland	Between the Sea and Sky	Sonata 1962	Between the Sea and Sky AND Emojiland
2017	Show: Errol and Fidel Concert: Dorian Gray	Generation Me		Freedom Riders	Georama	Generation Me	Georama	Errol and Fidel	Georama	Errol and Fidel	Generation Me
2016	Show: Children of Salt Concert: Illa! A Hip Hop Musical	Newton's Cradle		Dust Can't Kill Me	Newton's Cradle	Eh Dah? Questions for my Father	Newton's Cradle	Nickel Mines	A Scythe of Time	Dust Can't Kill Me	Dust Can't Kill Me
2015	The Calico Buffalo	Songs for the Fallen		The Cobalteans	The Cobalteans	The Cobalteans	Claudio Quest	What Do Critics Know?	Claudio Quest	Acappella	Acappella
2014	Cloned!	Academia Nuts		The Gig	The Gig	Bayonets of Angst	Academia Nuts	Propaganda! The Musical AND The Mapmaker's Opera (tie)	The Snow Queen	The Gig	Bayonets of Angst
2013	Volleygirls	Volleygirls	Crossing Swords	Julian Po	Gary Goldfarb: Master Escapist	Crossing Swords	Crossing Swords	Castle Walk	The Awakening of Angel DeLuna	The Awakening of Angel DeLuna	Volleygirls
2012	Baby Case	A Letter to Harvey Milk	Stuck	Baby Case	Baby Case AND A Letter to Harvey Milk (tie)	A Letter to Harvey Milk	Baby Case	Prison Dancer	Le Cabaret Grimm	Foreverman	Prison Dancer
2011	Crazy, Just Like Me	Jane Austen’s Pride and Prejudice	Kiki Baby	Central Avenue Breakdown	Date of a Lifetime	Jane Austen’s Pride and Prejudice	Jane Austen’s Pride and Prejudice	Central Avenue Breakdown	Pride and Prejudice	Central Avenue Breakdown	This One Girl's Story
2010	Things As They Are	My Mother's Lesbian Jewish Wiccan Wedding	I Got Fired	Trails	Frog Kiss	My Mother's Lesbian Jewish Wiccan Wedding	My Mother's Lesbian Jewish Wiccan Wedding	Petrouchka	Shine!	Without You (Note: 2010 was the first year to give an award for Outstanding Orchestrations.)	Fellowship! AND The Most Ridiculous Thing You Ever Hoid (tie)
2009	Fat Camp	My Scary Girl	Under Fire	Academy	Judas & Me	Fucking Up Everything	Hurricane	Fat Camp	Hurricane		Academy
2008	Idaho!	Bonnie & Clyde: A Folktale	The Jerusalem Syndrome	Bonnie & Clyde	College: The Musical	Love Jerry	Idaho!	Ward 9	Idaho!		Love Jerry
2007	Unlock'd	The Boy in the Bathroom	Sherlock Holmes (The Early Years)	The Yellow Wood	Such Good Friends	The Boy in the Bathroom	Such Good Friends	Platforms	The Boy in the Bathroom		Going Down Swingin'
2006	Smoking Bloomberg	Kingdom	River's End	Have a Nice Life	Three Sides	Desperate Measures AND Gutenberg! The Musical! (tie)	Common Grounds (Note: In 2006, there was one award given for Excellence in Direction and Choreography.)		Journey to the West		Have a Nice Life
