= Drama Desk Awards =

New York theater awards

- Awarded for: Excellence in Broadway, Off-Broadway, and Off-Off Broadway New York theatre
- Country: United States
- Presented by: The Drama Desk
- First award: 1955; 71 years ago
- Website: https://dramadesks.com
- Drama Desk Awards logo

2025 Drama Desk Award Winners
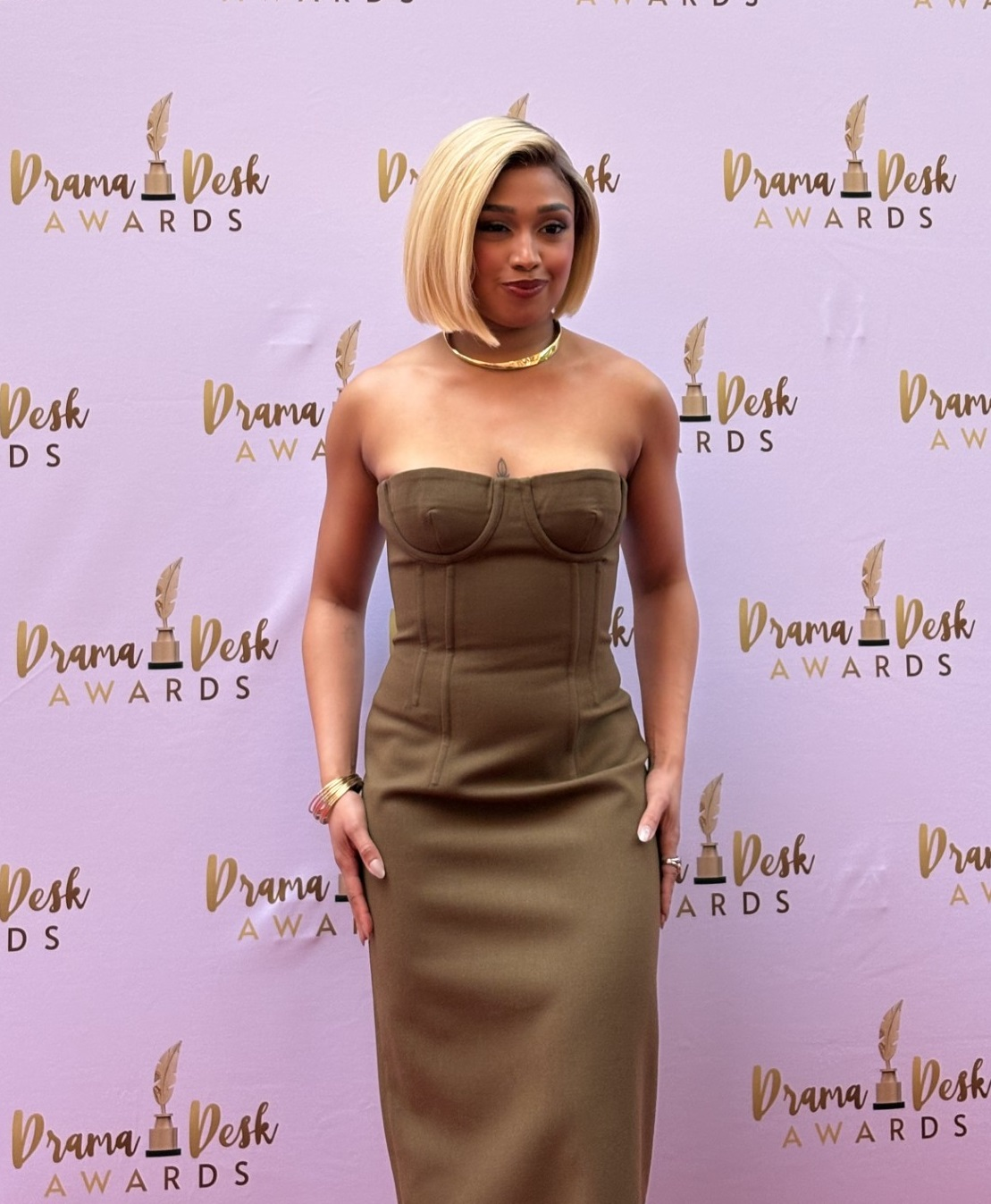

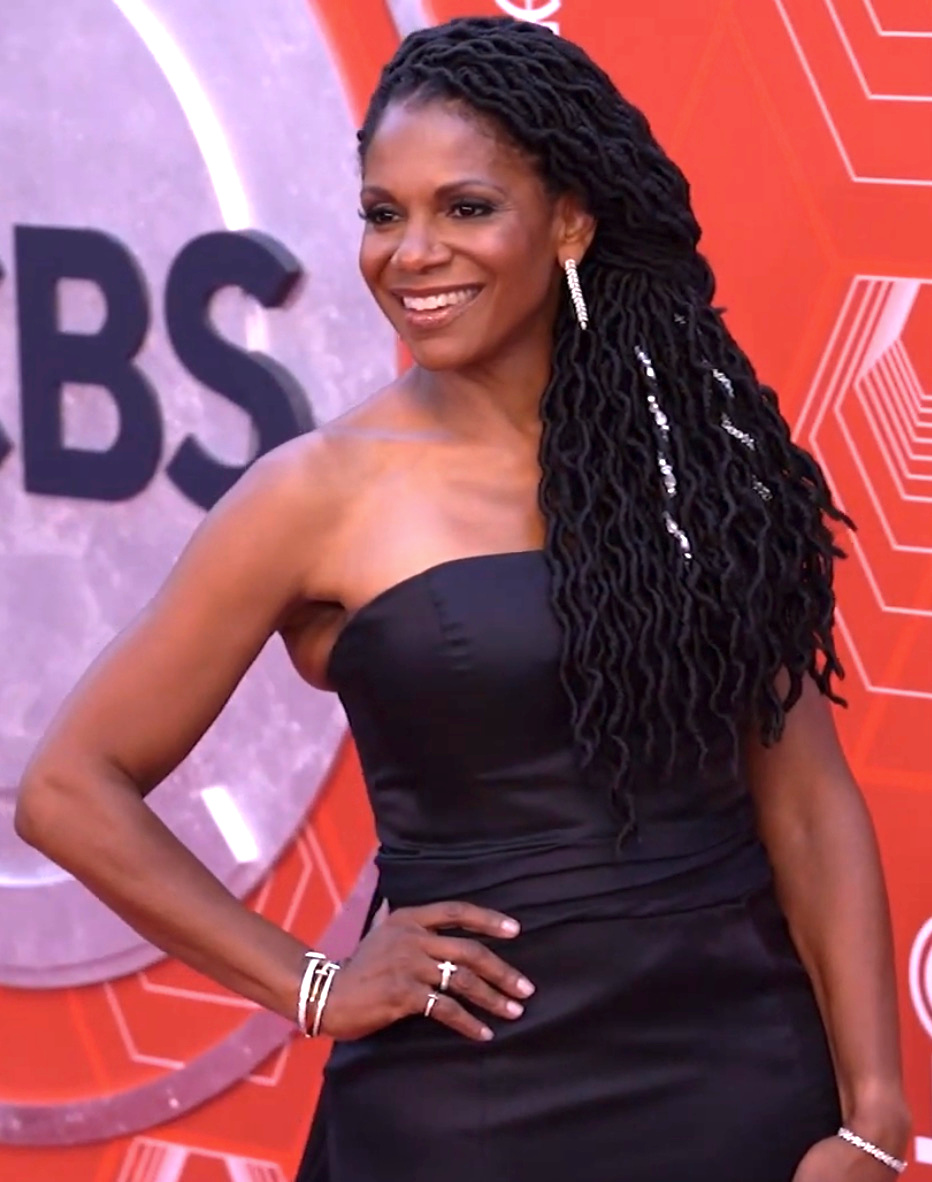

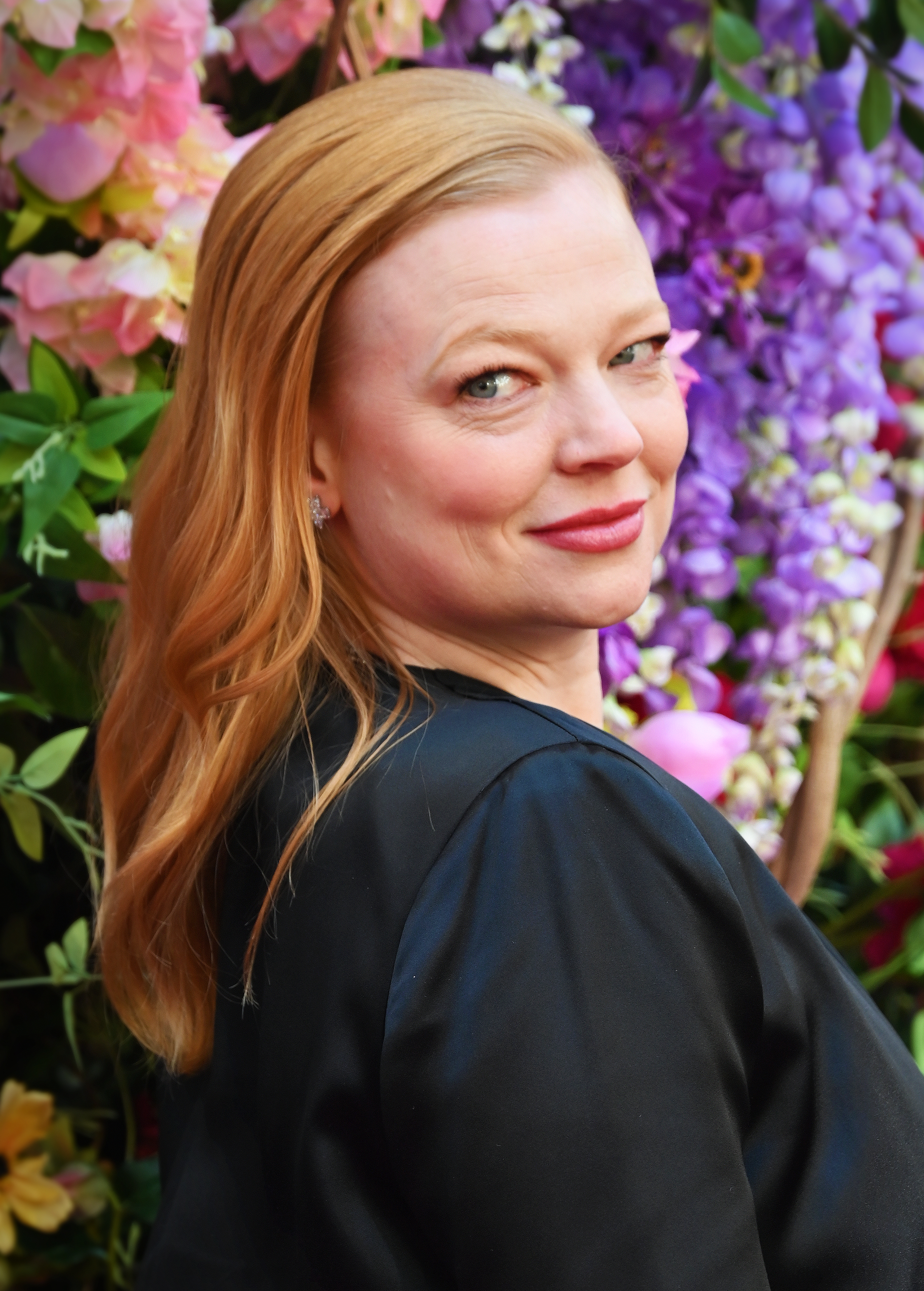

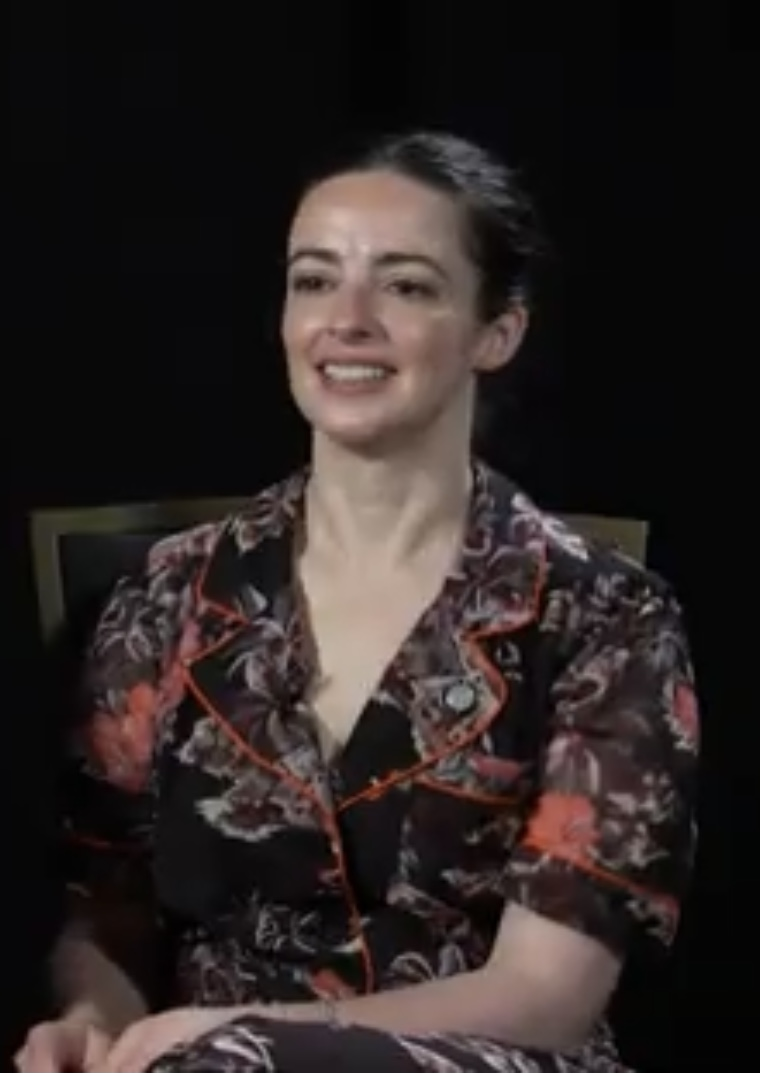
Award	Outstanding Lead Performance in a Musical	Outstanding Lead Performance in a Musical
Winners	Jasmine Amy Rogers (Boop! The Musical)	Audra McDonald (Gypsy)
Award	Outstanding Lead Performance in a Play	Outstanding Lead Performance in a Play
Winners	Sarah Snook (Dorian Gray)	Laura Donnelly (The Hills of California)
Award	Outstanding Musical	Outstanding Play
Winners	Maybe Happy Ending	Purpose

The Drama Desk Awards are among the most esteemed honors in New York theater, recognizing outstanding achievements across Broadway, Off-Broadway, and Off-Off-Broadway productions within the same categories. The awards are considered a significant American theater honor and are often referred to as "the Golden Globes of Theatre."

Established in 1955, the awards are presented annually by the Drama Desk organization, a collective of New York City-based theatre critics, journalists, editors, and publishers dedicated to celebrating excellence in the performing arts. The awards are represented by long-time Broadway press agency, Keith Sherman & Associates.

== History and mission ==
The Drama Desk organization was founded in 1949 by a group of theater critics and journalists aiming to spotlight significant issues in the theatrical industry and to support the development of New York theater. In 1955, the organization began presenting awards known as the Vernon Rice Awards, named after the New York Post critic who championed off-Broadway productions. The awards were renamed the Drama Desk Awards in the 1963–1964 season, and by the 1968–69 season, they expanded to include Broadway productions. In 1974, the Drama Desk was incorporated as a not-for-profit organization, and in 1975 its announcement of winners was expanded to include the nominees. Today, the awards are voted on by over 130 New York theater critics, reporters, writers, and arts editors, all of whom serve voluntarily and without vested interests in the results.

The Drama Desk Awards are distinctive in their comprehensive approach, evaluating productions from Broadway, off-Broadway, and off-off-Broadway on an equal footing. This inclusivity is intended to acknowledge both established and emerging talents. In 2023, the awards adopted gender-neutral performance categories. Each performance category now features twice as many nominees and two winners to recognize excellence.

The Drama Desk plans to expand the awards in 2027 to honor regional theater across the United States, along with Broadway, off-Broadway, and off-off Broadway, to become the only major theatrical award to honor professional theater nationally.

The Drama Desk Awards have brought attention to such artists as Morgan Freeman, Patti LuPone, Bernadette Peters, James Lapine, Nathan Lane, Ellen Burstyn, Audra McDonald, and Anthony Hopkins before they entered the theatrical mainstream. Works such as Hamilton, A Chorus Line, Driving Miss Daisy, Steel Magnolias, Sunday in the Park with George, and The Boys in the Band gained early recognition at the Drama Desk Awards.

Other notable winners of Drama Desk Awards include Elton John, Al Pacino, Julie Andrews, Helen Mirren, Dustin Hoffman, Whoopi Goldberg, Bette Midler, Ian McKellen, James Earl Jones, Kevin Spacey, Liza Minnelli, Hugh Jackman, Mel Brooks, Sarah Paulson, Tina Fey, Reba McEntire, Angela Lansbury, Jessica Lange, Lily Tomlin, Patrick Stewart, Viola Davis, Antonio Banderas, Lin-Manuel Miranda, Glenn Close, Catherine Zeta-Jones, Andrew Garfield, Neil Patrick Harris, James Corden, Anna Kendrick, Stephen Sondheim, Maury Yeston, Billy Crystal, Bob Fosse, Mike Nichols, Christine Baranski, Jessica Chastain, Sean Hayes, Chita Rivera, Edie Falco, Laura Linney, Kristin Chenoweth, Cynthia Nixon, Allison Janney, Cynthia Erivo, Elaine Stritch, Frank Langella, Phylicia Rashad, Jessica Tandy, Stockard Channing, Billy Porter, Harvey Fierstein, Sutton Foster, Stephanie J. Block, Jane Krakowski, Mike Birbiglia, Jesse Tyler Ferguson, Jason Alexander, Lena Horne, Lauren Bacall, Estelle Parsons, Ethel Merman, Glynis Johns, and Helen Hayes.

== Award Categories ==
=== Performance categories ===
- Outstanding Lead Performance in a Musical
- Outstanding Featured Performance in a Musical
- Outstanding Lead Performance in a Play
- Outstanding Featured Performance in a Play
- Outstanding Solo Performance

=== Show and technical categories ===
- Outstanding Musical
- Outstanding Revival of a Musical
- Outstanding Direction of a Musical
- Outstanding Book of a Musical
- Outstanding Music
- Outstanding Music in a Play
- Outstanding Lyrics
- Outstanding Orchestrations
- Outstanding Choreography
- Outstanding Costume Design of a Musical
- Outstanding Lighting Design of a Musical
- Outstanding Scenic Design of a Musical
- Outstanding Sound Design of a Musical
- Outstanding Play
- Outstanding Revival of a Play
- Outstanding Direction of a Play
- Outstanding Costume Design of a Play
- Outstanding Lighting Design of a Play
- Outstanding Scenic Design of a Play
- Outstanding Sound Design in a Play
- Outstanding Projection Design
- Outstanding Puppetry
- Outstanding Revue
- Outstanding Wig and Hair Design
- Outstanding Fight Choreography
- Outstanding Adaptation
- Unique Theatrical Experience

=== Special awards ===
- Drama Desk Special Award
- Outstanding Ensemble

=== Retired awards ===
- Outstanding Actor in a Musical
- Outstanding Actress in a Musical
- Outstanding Featured Actor in a Musical
- Outstanding Featured Actress in a Musical
- Outstanding Actor in a Play
- Outstanding Actress in a Play
- Outstanding Featured Actor in a Play
- Outstanding Featured Actress in a Play
- Outstanding Director
- Outstanding Revival
- Outstanding Costume Design
- Outstanding Lighting Design
- Outstanding Set Design
- Outstanding Sound Design

== Ceremony History ==
Season	Nominations announced date	Nomination announcement host(s)	Awards ceremony	Awards ceremony venue	Awards ceremony host(s)	Ref
2025-26	April 29, 2026	Raúl Esparza and Helen J. Shen	May 17, 2026	The Town Hall	Marla Mindelle	
2024-25	April 20, 2025	Norm Lewis	June 1, 2025	Skirball Center for the Performing Arts	Debra Messing & Tituss Burgess	
2023–24	April 29, 2024	Kathleen Turner	June 10, 2024	Skirball Center for the Performing Arts	Sutton Foster & Aaron Tveit	
2022–23	April 27, 2023	Donna McKechnie	June 6, 2023	Sardi's	Mandy Patinkin & Kathryn Grody	
2021–22	May 16, 2022	George Takei	June 14, 2022	Sardi's	Renée Elise Goldsberry	
2020-21	No awards: New York theatres shuttered, March 2020 to September 2021, due to the COVID-19 pandemic in New York City					
2019–20	April 21, 2020	Seth Rudetsky	June 13, 2020	Virtual ceremony	Frank DiLella	
2018–19	April 25, 2019	Roma Torre	June 2, 2019	The Town Hall	Michael Urie	
2017–18	April 26, 2018	Jane Krakowski & Tituss Burgess	June 3, 2018	The Town Hall	Michael Urie	
2016–17	April 27, 2017	Laura Benanti & Javier Muñoz	June 4, 2017	The Town Hall	Michael Urie	
2015–16	April 28, 2016	Matthew Morrison & Vanessa Williams	June 5, 2016	The Town Hall	Michael Urie	
2014–15	April 23, 2015	Judith Light & Jessie Mueller	May 31, 2015	The Town Hall	Laura Benanti	
2013–14	April 25, 2014	Robert Lopez, Kristen Anderson-Lopez & Fran Drescher	June 1, 2014	The Town Hall	Laura Benanti	
2012–13	April 29, 2013	Linda Lavin & John Lloyd Young	May 19, 2013	The Town Hall	Jan Maxwell & John Lloyd Young	
2011–12	April 27, 2012	Donna Murphy & Brian d'Arcy James	June 3, 2012	The Town Hall	Brooke Shields & Brian d'Arcy James	
2010–11	April 29, 2011	Audra McDonald & Liev Schreiber	May 23, 2011	Hammerstein Ballroom	Harvey Fierstein	
2009–10	May 3, 2010	Brian Stokes Mitchell & Cady Huffman	May 23, 2010	LaGuardia Concert Hall	Patti LuPone	
2008–09	April 27, 2009	Jim Dale & Faith Prince	May 17, 2009	LaGuardia Concert Hall	Harvey Fierstein	
2007–08	April 28, 2008	Bebe Neuwirth & Len Cariou	May 18, 2008	LaGuardia Concert Hall	Jeff Bowen, Hunter Bell, Susan Blackwell, & Heidi Blickenstaff	
2006–07	April 26, 2007	James Naughton & Beth Leavel	May 20, 2007	LaGuardia Concert Hall	Kristin Chenoweth	
2005-06	April 27, 2006	Marvin Hamlisch & Donna McKechnie	May 21, 2006	LaGuardia Concert Hall	Harvey Fierstein	
2004-05	April 28, 2005	Robert Goulet & Lynn Redgrave	May 22, 2005	LaGuardia Concert Hall	Harvey Fierstein	
2003-04	April 29, 2004	Mary-Louise Parker & Tony Roberts	May 16, 2004	LaGuardia Concert Hall	Harvey Fierstein	
2002-03	May 1, 2003	Judy Kaye & Martin Richards	May 18, 2003	LaGuardia Concert Hall	Chita Rivera	
2001-02	April 30, 2002	John Stamos & Polly Bergen	May 19, 2002	LaGuardia Concert Hall	Rue McClanahan	
2000-01	May 1, 2001	Michele Lee & Dick Cavett	May 25, 2001	LaGuardia Concert Hall	Lily Tomlin	
1999-00	April 25, 2000	Susan Lucci & Tom Wopat	May 14, 2000	LaGuardia Concert Hall	Bebe Neuwirth	
1998-99	April 19, 1999	Bebe Neuwirth & Joel Grey	May 9, 1999	LaGuardia Concert Hall	Bernadette Peters	
1997-98	April 27, 1998	Freddie Roman, Lillias White, & Robert Cuccioli	May 17, 1998	The Kaye Playhouse at Hunter College	No Host	
1996-97	April 28, 1997	Julie Harris & Michael Nouri	May 18, 1997	Booth Theatre	No Host	
1995-96	May 2, 1996		May 19, 1996	New Victory Theater	Tony Randall	

== See also ==
Other theatre awards in New York:

- Tony Awards
- Lucille Lortel Awards
- Obie Awards
- New York Drama Critics' Circle
- Drama League Awards
- Theatre World Awards
