= Vineyard Theatre =

Off-Broadway theatre company

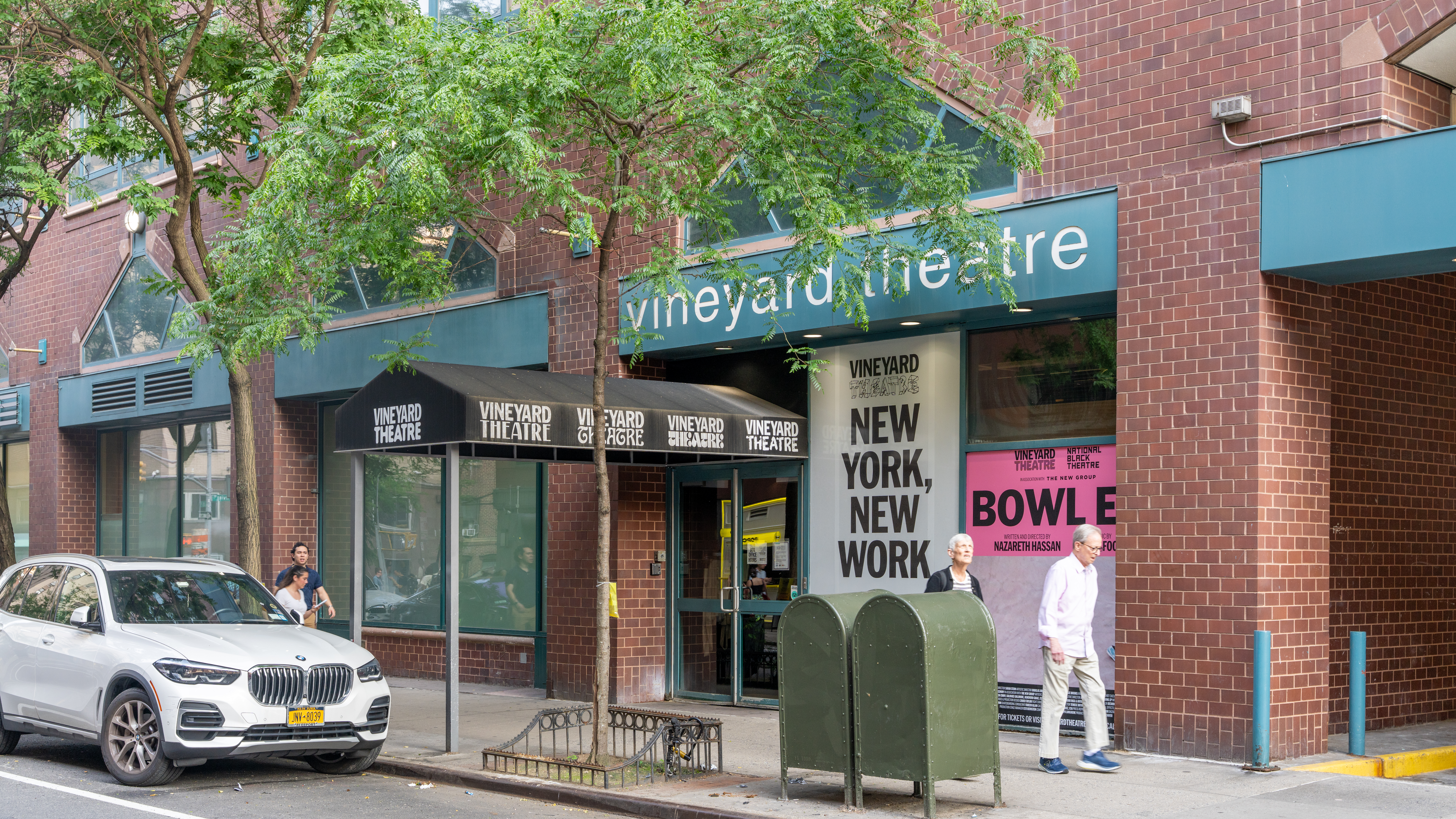
- (2025)
- Interactive map of Vineyard Theatre
- Address: 108 East 15th Street; New York City; United States
- Coordinates: 40°44′05″N 73°59′20″W
- Owner: Vineyard Theatre and Workshop Center Inc.
- Capacity: 132
- Type: Off-Broadway

Construction
- Opened: 1981; 45 years ago

Website
- www.vineyardtheatre.org

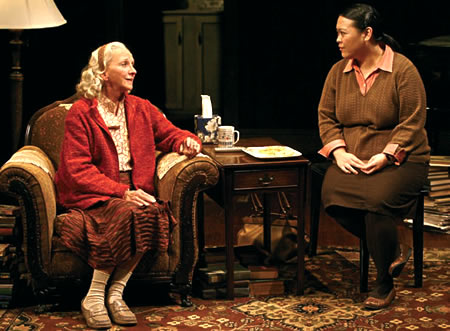
A scene from Vineyard Theatre's production of Julia Cho's The Piano Teacher.

The Vineyard Theatre is a 120-seat Off-Broadway non-profit theatre company, located at 108 East 15th Street in Manhattan, New York City, near Union Square. Founded in 1981 by Barbara Zinn Krieger in a 1,700-square-foot (160 m^{2}) former storeroom at the Phipps Plaza West apartment complex, the Vineyard states that its goal is "to give daring artists a safe space to create exhilarating, original theatre." The company is operated by Vineyard Theatre and Workshop Center Inc., a nonprofit organization. It moved to its present site at Zeckendorf Towers in 1989.

The Vineyard Theatre is known for its productions of the Tony Award-winning musical Avenue Q, Paula Vogel's How I Learned to Drive (a Pulitzer Prize winner), and Jeff Bowen and Hunter Bell's musical [title of show] (which won an Obie Award). The company has a long history of recognition by their theatrical peers. Doug Aibel and the Vineyard were the recipients of the 1998 Obie's Ross Wetzsteon Award "For Sustained Support of artists and Creativity in the Theater". The company received the Lucille Lortel Edith Oliver Award for Sustained Excellence in 2003. In addition, the Vineyard Theatre was the recipient of a 1998 Jonathan Larson Grant, and of the related 2003 Jonathan Larson Performing Arts Foundation grant, the latter for the production of Kirsten Childs' Miracle Brothers. It has also received a Drama Desk award.

Productions have included Nicky Silver's Pterodactyls, Craig Lucas's The Dying Gaul, Christopher Shinn's Where Do We Live, Cornelius Eady's Brutal Imagination, Gina Gionfriddo's After Ashley, and the Laura Nyro musical Eli's Comin'.

Krieger decided to name the theatre "Vineyard" because she thought the experience of starting up a new theatre company was similar to the process of developing a new wine.
