= List of surf musicians =

This is a list of surf musicians. Surf music is a genre of popular music associated with surf culture, particularly as found in Orange County and other areas of Southern California. It was especially popular from 1961 to 1966, has subsequently been revived and was highly influential on subsequent rock music.

== 1960s ==
- The Atlantics
- The Astronauts
- The Beach Boys
- The Bel-Airs
- Bruce & Terry
- Al Casey
- The Centurians
- The Challengers
- The Champs
- The Chantays
- Jerry Cole
- Dick Dale
- Eddie & the Showmen
- Electric Johnny & his Skyrockets
- The Fantastic Baggys
- The Fender IV
- Jim Fuller
- Mr. Gasser & the Weirdos
- The Hondells
- The Honeys
- Jan & Dean
- Paul Johnson
- Bruce Johnston
- The Lively Ones
- The Marketts
- Terry Melcher
- Jim Messina & the Jesters
- The Navarros
- Sandy Nelson
- The Orange Peels
- Richard Podolor
- The Pyramids
- The Revels
- The Rip-Chords
- The Rivieras
- The Rockin' Rebels
- Ronny & the Daytonas
- Royale Monarchs
- The Sandals
- The Sentinals
- The Shadows
- The Spinners
- The Sunrays
- The Surfaris
- Takeshi Terauchi
- The Tornadoes
- The Trashmen
- Gary Usher
- The Ventures

== Later revivalists ==
- Agent Orange
- Allah-Las
- The Apemen
- Aqua Velvets
- Atomic 7
- The Bambi Molesters
- The Barracudas
- Beach Fossils
- Best Coast
- Blue Hawaiians
- The Bomboras
- Greg Camp (of late 1990s band Smash Mouth, currently of Defektor)
- Martin Cilia
- Shana Cleveland
- Daikaiju
- Laramie Dean
- The Drums
- Dum Dum Girls
- The El Caminos
- Toulouse Engelhardt
- Fidlar
- The 5.6.7.8's
- Donavon Frankenreiter
- Les Fradkin & Get Wet
- The Fresh & Onlys
- The Ghastly Ones
- The Good The Bad
- The Growlers
- Ash Grunwald
- Ben Howard
- Huevos Rancheros
- Chris Isaak
- Jon and the Nightriders
- Junior Brown
- King Gizzard & the Lizard Wizard (earlier releases)
- La Luz
- Langhorns
- Laika & the Cosmonauts
- Lo Presher
- Man or Astro-man?
- The Mermen
- Messer Chups
- The Mulchmen
- The New Electric Sound
- No Age
- Par Avion
- The Phantom Surfers
- Phono-Comb
- Pixies
- The Raybeats
- Real Estate
- Red Elvises
- Reef
- The Reigning Monarchs
- The Reverb Syndicate
- Rootjoose
- Les Savy Fav
- Shadowy Men on a Shadowy Planet
- Shannon and the Clams
- Cody Simpson
- Los Straitjackets
- Southern Culture on the Skids
- Sublime
- The Surfrajettes
- Surf City
- Surf Coasters
- Surf Curse
- Surf Punks
- Surfer Blood
- Susan and the Surftones
- The Tarantulas
- The Thurston Lava Tube
- The Trashwomen
- Eddie Vedder
- Vivian Girls
- Wallows
- Wavves
- The Young Werewolves
- The Ziggens
- Y Niwl
