= Lloyd Thaxton Goes Surfing with The Challengers =

Studio album by The Challengers
- Released: 1963
- Genre: Surf
- Length: 33:14
- Label: Vault
- Producer: Richard Delvy

The Challengers chronology
Surfbeat (1963)	Lloyd Thaxton Goes Surfing with The Challengers (1963)	On the Move (1963)

Lloyd Thaxton Goes Surfing with The Challengers is the second album by the surf rock band The Challengers. This album was issued in 1963, at the peak of the "surf wave", in South California. This record was a "hard to find" LP, until the Sundazed Music cie (on the Yesterdazed Series) released it back, in 1994, with 2 previously unissued bonus tracks.

Lloyd Thaxton was host-producer of The Lloyd Thaxton Show, one of the highest rated musical shows in Hollywood. Born in Memphis, Tennessee, and brought up in Toledo, Ohio, Lloyd moved his family to Hollywood in 1957. The Lloyd Thaxton Show is a favorite not only for teenagers, but with their parents as well, because the show is more than a dance-party; it is filled with a variety of crazy and entertaining gimmicks.

By the time Surfing With The Challengers was issued in the spring of 1963, the band become one of the most visible and influential musical groups in Southern California. Their debut album, Surfbeat was selling well and Wallichs Music City had an entire window display devoted to the band. They were a permanent fixture on local TV dance shows and appeared at the Y-Day Concert at the Hollywood Bowl.

The choice of the tracks used for Surfing With The Challengers repeated the approach followed on their first album: unique surf instrumental versions of late 1950s rock instrumental (songs by Duane Eddy, The Fireballs and The Ventures) coupled with The Challengers' originals. This served to emphasize how much the new genre of surf music had been inspired by the rich heritage of rock instrumentals from the "golden age" just three or four years before.

The choice of material, and the wonderful crisp and restrained production of both this album and the earlier Surfbeat, were inspirational to most teen bands at the time.

== Track listing ==
No.	Title	Writer(s)	Length
1.	"Moondawg"	D.Weaver	2:48
2.	"(Dance with the) Guitar Man"	Eddy-Hazelwood	2:14
3.	"Comin' Home Baby"	B.Tucker-B.Dorough	2:14
4.	"You Can't Sit Down"	Clark-Upchurch-Muldrow	2:53
5.	"Foot Patter"	G.Tomsco	2:23
6.	"Rampage"	G.Grey	2:15
7.	"Ventures' Medley"	Smith-Dominguez-Leeds	2:59
8.	"Surfer's Pony"	R.Delvy	2:12
9.	"The Twomp"	D.Wilson	1:59
10.	"Tidal Wave"	Bertrand	2:13
11.	"Satan's Theme"	B.Meyer-D.Ganc	2:23
12.	"So What"	R.Delvy	2:09

Previously unissued bonus tracks
No.	Title	Writer(s)	Length
13.	"Out of Limits"	M.Z.Gordon	2:14
14.	"Moondawg (alt. Version)"	D.Weaver	2:18

== Personnel ==
- Randy Nauert: Bass.
- Don Landis: Rhythm Guitar.
- Glenn Grey: Lead Guitar.
- Richard Delvy: Leader & Drummer.
- Jim Roberts: Piano & Organ.
- Nick Hefner: Sax.
