= Richard Delvy =

American drummer

- Born: Richard Delvecchio; April 20, 1942; Bridgeport, Connecticut, United States
- Died: February 6, 2010 (aged 67) West Hills, California, United States
- Genres: Surf music Folk rock Psychedelic folk Pop rock
- Instruments: Drums, percussion
- Years active: 1960–2010
- Labels: Vault Records; GNP; Rhino Records; World Pacific; Sundazed; Fantasy; Teichiku Records (Union)
- Formerly of: The Challengers; The Clee-Shays; The Surfriders; The Good Guys; The De-Fenders

Richard Delvy (April 20, 1942 – February 6, 2010) was an American music entrepreneur. He started in the music business as a drummer who played with The Bel-Airs and took his experience to broader appeal with The Challengers, who were in the forefront of the surf music explosion in southern California. He also worked as a composer, arranger, music manager, producer, and music publisher. He owned the rights to several iconic surf and rock songs including "Wipe Out", "Mr. Moto" (written by him with Paul Johnson), and "Chick-A-Boom (Don't Ya Jes' Love It)". He is well known as being one of the first pioneers of surf music.

== Overview ==
Richard Delvy was a surf music pioneer. In 1960, the first band he played drums in was called The Bel-Airs, and in late 1962, he founded The Challengers. They produced a smash hit album titled Surfbeat, released in January 1963. Surfbeat took the California Sound and surf music to new levels of acceptance and remains the best selling surf album of all time. His band released 15 Challengers albums throughout the sixties as well as others recorded under different names for the US and foreign markets.

Delvy also worked as a record producer through the rest of the 60's evolving with hot rod rock, folk rock, pop, rock, and psychedelic rock music as they developed. In the early 1970s, Delvy toured as the music director for Tony Orlando and Dawn and with the teen sensation David Cassidy, star of The Partridge Family TV show. During Delvy's career, he also worked for MGM Music, Bell Records, and Carousel Records. Billboard recognized Delvy as a multi-talented music entrepreneur and promoter who had the talent to join many different attributes needed as a performer and to manage artists' output effectively.

== Death and legacy ==
Richard Delvy died on February 6, 2010, after suffering from a long illness. He helped produce many known and unknown artists, and was involved in all aspects of the music business. He was out lived by his wife Bonnie, three children, and one grandchild.

== Credits (incomplete) ==
=== Bands and music ===
- The Outsiders
- The Chambers Brothers
- The Other Half
- The Grateful Dead
- Buzz Clifford
- Peanut Butter Conspiracy
- A.B. Skhy
- The Surfaris
- The Challengers
- The Great Scots
- The Citations
- Dick Monda
- Colours
- Formula IV
- Thom Starr & The Galaxies
- Thunder & Lightning
- Hamilton Streetcar
- The Good Guys
- The Surfriders
- The Clee-Shays
- The De-Fenders
- Daddy Dewdrop aka

The Groovy Ghoulies

=== Films ===
- The Green Slime (1968)

=== Television ===
- Fat Albert and the Cosby Kids
- Groovie Goolies
- The Archie Show (also called The Archies)
