= List of people from Malibu, California =

The following is a list of notable people who were born in, or have been residents of, or otherwise closely associated with the American city of Malibu, California. The listed people are Americans unless otherwise noted.

== A ==
- Cisco Adler – musician
- Rick Allen – British drummer; Def Leppard
- Paul Almond – Canadian filmmaker and novelist
- Herb Alpert – musician, founder of A&M Records
- Carlos Amezcua – Los Angeles television news anchor
- Pamela Anderson – Canadian-born actress
- Richard Dean Anderson – actor
- Angelyne – singer and model
- Jennifer Aniston – actress
- Rachel Ashwell – English-born author, designer, entrepreneur
- Emilie Autumn – singer

== B ==
- Simon Baker – actor
- Lucinda Bassett – motivational speaker
- Beck – musician
- Kristen Bell – actress
- Justin Berfield – actor, producer and writer
- Halle Berry – actress
- Valerie Bertinelli – actress
- Emily Blunt – English actress
- Ben Bostrom – motorcycle racer
- Clara Bow (deceased) – actress
- Ryan Braun – professional baseball player
- Jeff Bridges – actor
- James Brolin – actor, producer and director
- Charles Bronson (deceased) – actor
- Mel Brooks – film director, producer, and writer
- Pierce Brosnan – Irish actor
- Bruce Buffer – UFC announcer
- Geneviève Bujold – actress
- Mark Burnett – British-born director, producer

== C ==
- Colbie Caillat – singer
- Dean Cain – actor
- James Cameron – Canadian-born director and producer
- Dyan Cannon – actress
- Adam Carolla – comedian
- Jim Carrey – Canadian-American actor
- Colette Carr – singer and rapper
- Johnny Carson (deceased) – talk show host
- Chris Chelios – retired NHL player
- Cher – singer, actress
- Dick Clark (deceased) – television personality; businessman
- Jackie Collins (deceased) – British novelist
- Carl Colpaert – director; founder of Cineville
- Lauren Conrad – reality-television personality
- Robert Conrad (deceased) – actor
- Courteney Cox – actress
- Cindy Crawford – supermodel
- Leo Cullum (deceased) – cartoonist, best known for his work in The New Yorker
- John Cusack – actor
- Miley Cyrus – singer

== D ==
- Tony Danza – actor
- Bette Davis (deceased) – actress
- Eileen Davidson – actress, reality star
- Olivia De Berardinis – pin-up artist
- Giada De Laurentiis – Italian television chef
- Lana Del Rey – singer
- Patrick Dempsey – actor
- Bruce Dern – actor
- Laura Dern – actress
- Danny DeVito – actor, director, producer
- Leonardo DiCaprio – actor
- Joan Didion (deceased) – writer
- Shannen Doherty (deceased) – actress
- Stephen Dorff – actor
- Robert Downey Jr. – actor
- Roma Downey – actress
- Fran Drescher – actress, author, producer
- David Dreier – U.S. congressman, chairman of Tribune Publishing Company
- Minnie Driver – actress
- David Duchovny – actor
- Bob Dylan – singer

== E ==
- Sam Elliott – actor
- David Ellison – film producer, founder of Skydance Productions
- Lawrence Ellison – businessman, founder of Oracle Corporation
- Megan Ellison – film producer, founder of Annapurna Pictures
- Cary Elwes – actor
- Emilio Estevez – actor, director
- Melissa Etheridge – singer

== F ==
- Tami Farrell – Miss Teen USA 2003, Miss California USA 2009
- Norman Fell (deceased) – actor
- Sally Field – actress
- Erin Fitzgerald – voice actress
- Joe Flanigan – actor
- John Fante – writer
- Jane Fonda – actress

== G ==
- Kenny G – saxophonist
- Lady Gaga – singer, songwriter
- John A. Garcia – chief executive officer of Novalogic Inc., philanthropist
- James Garner (deceased) – actor, The Rockford Files
- Kevin Garnett – NBA basketball player
- Brad Garrett – actor
- David Geffen – producer, record producer
- Richard Gere – actor
- Mel Gibson – actor, director, producer
- Brad Gilbert (born 1961) – tennis coach, television tennis commentator, and former professional tennis player
- Whoopi Goldberg – actress, comedian
- Taylor Goldsmith – singer, songwriter, Dawes
- Louis Gossett Jr. – actor, Roots
- Thomas Gottschalk – German radio host, television host, entertainer, actor
- Camille Grammer – ex-wife of actor Kelsey Grammer, former castmate of The Real Housewives of Beverly Hills, dancer and model
- Kelsey Grammer – actor, Dr. Frasier Crane on TV's Cheers and Frasier
- Cary Grant (deceased) – actor
- Josh Groban – singer
- Matt Groening – cartoonist of The Simpsons and Futurama

== H ==
- Gigi Hadid – model
- Larry Hagman (deceased) – actor
- Mark Hamill – actor
- Laird Hamilton – surfer
- Tom Hanks – actor, producer
- Ed Harris – actor
- Goldie Hawn – actress
- David Hemmings – British actor
- Don Henley – musician, co-founder of the Eagles
- Henry Hill (deceased) – gangster
- Jonah Hill – actor
- Paris Hilton – heiress
- Dustin Hoffman – actor
- Anthony Hopkins – Welsh actor
- Kate Hudson – actress
- Jim Hutton (deceased) – actor
- Timothy Hutton – actor, producer and director

== I ==
- Tris Imboden – drummer for Southern California rock band Honk, and for jazz-fusion and pop band Chicago

== J ==
- Janet Jackson – singer and actress
- David Janssen (deceased) – actor
- Brody Jenner – reality-television personality
- Dakota Johnson – actress
- Angelina Jolie – actress
- Jennifer Jones (deceased) – actress
- John Paul Larkin (deceased) – musician and dancer; known professionally as Scatman John
- Jaden Smith – actor and rapper

== K ==
- Terry Kath (deceased) – guitarist, singer-songwriter of Chicago
- Jeffrey Katzenberg – producer
- Stacy Keach – actor
- Brian Keith (deceased) – actor
- Miranda Kerr – model
- Anthony Kiedis – frontman of the Red Hot Chili Peppers
- Jimmy Kimmel – comedian, television presenter
- Suge Knight – chief executive officer of Death Row Records
- John Krasinski – actor
- Thomas Kretschmann – German actor
- Chantal Kreviazuk – Canadian singer-songwriter
- Kris Kristofferson (deceased) – actor, singer-songwriter

== L ==
- Michael Landon (deceased) – actor
- André Landzaat (deceased) – actor
- Angela Lansbury (deceased) – actress, singer
- Chloe Lattanzi – singer; daughter of Matt Lattanzi and Olivia Newton-John
- Matt Lattanzi – actor; former husband of Olivia Newton-John
- Jane Leeves – English actress
- Louis Leithold (deceased) – scholar and writer; wrote The Calculus, a widely used high school and college calculus textbook
- Jack Lemmon (deceased) – actor
- Téa Leoni – actress
- David Letterman – talk show host, comedian
- Brian "Limmy" Limond – Scottish variety entertainer
- Richard Littlejohn – English journalist
- Sandra Tsing Loh – writer
- Rob Lowe – actor
- John Lydon (also known as Johnny Rotten) – British-Irish singer

== M ==
- Ali MacGraw – actress
- Shirley MacLaine – actress
- Amy Madigan – actress
- Michael Madsen (deceased) – actor
- Lee Majors – actor
- Howie Mandel – actor, comedian, game show host
- Dinah Manoff – actress
- Stuart Margolin (deceased) – actor
- Alden Marin – painter, poet
- Shannon Marketic – model, Miss California USA 1992 and Miss USA 1992
- Merrill Markoe – writer
- Chris Martin – British singer, frontman of Coldplay
- Nan Martin (deceased) – actress
- Walter Matthau (deceased) – actor
- Nick Matzorkis - entrepreneur, musician
- Dave McCary – comedian, writer, director
- Matthew McConaughey – actor
- John C. McGinley – actor
- Scott Menville – voice actor, singer
- Courtney Miller – actress and internet personality on Smosh
- Reggie Miller – retired NBA player
- Brian Moore (deceased) – Northern Ireland-Canadian novelist, screenwriter and journalist
- Demi Moore – actress
- Alanis Morissette – Canadian singer-songwriter
- Eddie Murphy – actor
- Bill Murray – actor, comedian

== N ==
- Randy Nauert (deceased) – musician, co-founder and bassist for the surf rock band The Challengers
- Jack Nicholson – actor
- Nick Nolte – actor
- Olivia Newton-John (deceased) – Australian singer, actress; resident 1974–2009

== O ==
- Merle Oberon (deceased) – actress
- Carroll O'Connor (deceased) – actor
- Edna May Oliver (deceased) – actress
- Tatum O'Neal – actress
- Ryan O'Neal (deceased) – actor
- Roy Orbison (deceased) – country/rockabilly singer-songwriter, guitarist

== P ==
- Jimmy Page – British guitarist; Led Zeppelin
- Brad Paisley – country music singer
- Victor Palmieri – attorney, businessman
- Gary Patterson – artist
- Sam Peckinpah – movie director
- Sean Penn – actor, director
- William Phipps – actor, film producer
- Frank Pierson (deceased) – screenwriter, director
- Pink – singer
- Brad Pitt – actor
- Eve Plumb – actress
- Ron Popeil (deceased) – direct marketing inventor
- Donald Prell (deceased) – WWII veteran, venture capitalist
- Victoria Principal – actress
- Tom Petty (deceased) – musician; Tom Petty & The Heartbreakers

== Q ==
- Kathleen Quinlan – actress
- Martha Quinn – actress, original MTV VJ and Sirius satellite radio show host

== R ==
- Prem Rawat – Indian-American inspirational speaker and former guru
- Robert Redford (deceased) – actor, director
- Nick Richards – singer
- Rihanna – singer-songwriter, actress, model, fashion designer
- Frederick Rindge & May Rindge (both deceased) – founders of Malibu
- Linda Ronstadt – singer
- Axl Rose – singer
- Edward P. Roski – chief executive officer and chairman, Majestic Realty Co.
- Diana Ross – singer, actress
- Katharine Ross – actress
- Rick Rubin – record producer; co-president, Columbia Records
- Kurt Russell – actor

== S ==
- Tom Schaar – skateboarder
- George C. Scott (deceased) – actor
- Jane Seymour – British actress
- Tom Shadyac – director
- Charlie Sheen – actor
- Martin Sheen – actor
- Shwayze – singer
- Frank Sinatra (deceased) – singer, actor
- Grace Slick – singer
- Jaden Smith – actor
- Suzanne Somers (deceased) – actress, entrepreneur
- David Spade – actor, comedian
- Britney Spears – singer, actress
- Steven Spielberg – director
- Rick Springfield – Australian-American singer and actor
- Sylvester Stallone – actor
- John Stamos – actor
- Barbara Stanwyck (deceased) – actress
- Rod Steiger (deceased) – actor
- Donald Sterling – businessman; former owner of Los Angeles Clippers
- Jeffrey Stibel – entrepreneur
- Sting – British singer and composer
- Emma Stone – actress
- Yvonne Strahovski – Australian actress
- Barbra Streisand – singer, actress
- Dominique Swain – actress
- Gloria Swanson (deceased) – actress

== T ==
- Charlize Theron – South African-American actress
- Robin Thicke – singer
- Jonathan Taylor Thomas – actor
- Sandi Thom – singer
- John Travolta – actor
- Cicely Tyson (deceased) – actress

== V ==
- Dick Van Dyke – actor, comedian
- Eddie Van Halen (deceased) – guitarist; Van Halen
- Vince Van Patten – television presenter
- Emmanuel Villaume – conductor
- Jan-Michael Vincent (deceased) – actor
- Lexi VonderLieth – professional surfer
- Andrew von Oeyen – concert pianist

== W ==
- Kanye West – rapper
- Rachel Ward – actress
- Jordan Wilimovsky – Olympic pool and open water swimmer
- Kimberly Williams-Paisley – actress
- Bruce Willis – actor
- Flip Wilson (deceased) – comedian, actor, host of The Flip Wilson Show
- William Wyler (deceased) – director

== Z ==
- Roxana Zal – actress

== See also ==
- List of people from California
