= Clearlight =

Clearlight or Clear Light may refer to:

- Clear Light, a 1960s American psychedelic rock band

- Clear Light (album), 1967 album by that band

- Clearlight (American band), a 2000s instrumental rock band
- Clearlight (French band), a 1970s progressive rock band
- Luminous mind (ösel), the luminosity or clear light of the mind in Buddhism
