= Barbara Robison =

American singer (1945–1988)

Background information
- Also known as: Sandi Robison; Sandi Peanut Butter
- Born: Barbara Jeane Moyer; October 14, 1945; Las Vegas, Nevada, U.S.
- Died: April 22, 1988 (aged 42) Billings, Montana, U.S.
- Genres: Psychedelic rock; psychedelic pop; folk
- Occupation: Singer
- Years active: 1963–1988

Barbara "Sandi" Robison (born Barbara Jeane Moyer, October 14, 1945 – April 22, 1988), also known as Sandi Peanut Butter, was an American singer who achieved the most success as the lead vocalist for the psychedelic rock band the Peanut Butter Conspiracy. Robison was one of the earliest female vocalists of a rock band, and she was involved in other acts after the group's disbandment, including the musical Hair.

== Biography ==
=== Beginnings ===
Barbara "Sandi" Robison was born October 14, 1945, as Barbara Jeane Moyer in Las Vegas, Nevada. Robison's parents died when she was young, so throughout her childhood Robison was raised by her grandparents in the small town of Lagunitas, California. She sang in her local high school's chorus assembly. By her early teens, she was also singing in her local church, and had the ability to perform in multiple genres, including folk, pop, and rock.

=== Early career ===
Toward the latter part of high school, Robison gravitated toward the folk music scene. She met contemporaries such as David Crosby, Dino Valenti, and future husband Robbie Robison, who was later a part of the band Clear Light. In 1963, at the age of 18, she married Robbie Robison and moved to Los Angeles where she began performing with him as a duo. A year later, future PBC member John Merrill met Barbara Robison after a gig in The Insomniac, located in Hermosa Beach. He proposed that she join his group, which included bassist Jim Cherniss, in recording a single. Robison accepted, and she made her recording debut in January 1965 by providing backing vocals to the folk-rock single that included "Love Her Everyday" b/w "Or Else You'll Cry" under the group name The Young Swingers. Their next single, recorded in April 1965, placed Robison at lead vocals. The single included "Wind's Up High" b/w "Let's Take Our Love". In 1965, Alan Brackett joined; a drummer named Doug Rowe was added but soon replaced by Spencer Dryden. From this point on, the five-piece band was called "The Ashes".

The Ashes were able to obtain a steady gig at the Waleback club in Santa Monica in October 1965. Robison, only 20, needed a borrowed ID to enter the club. She went under the alias "Sandi Moon" and was commonly addressed as such; she was later even credited as "Sandi Peanut Butter" on the first two Peanut Butter Conspiracy albums. February 1966 came, and with it The Ashes' first single, called "Is There Anything I Can Do?" b/w "Every Little Prayer", on the Vault Records label. It featured Robison on lead vocals. Another single, "Dark On You Now" b/w "Roses Gone" followed with Robison on vocals again, but neither of their singles made much impact outside of Los Angeles. By May 1966, Dryden left to replace Skip Spence of Jefferson Airplane, and "Sandi" had to call quits in June to soon deliver her child. The Ashes disbanded soon afterwards. Following the birth of her son, Scott Robison, Barbara Robison returned to her music career, starting in September 1966. She, along with Merrill and Brackett, added two more members for their new group, including drummer Jim Voigt and guitarist Lance Fent. The Peanut Butter Conspiracy formed by the end of 1966 and was recording by 1967.

=== The Peanut Butter Conspiracy ===
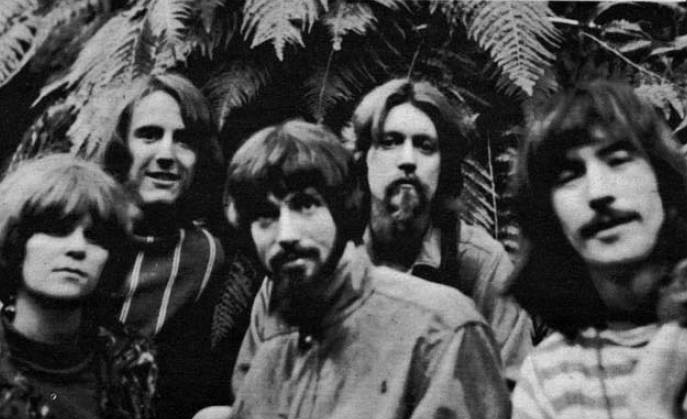
Robison (first from left) as part of The Peanut Butter Conspiracy in 1966

The Peanut Butter Conspiracy signed to Columbia Records after sessions with five recording companies. Robison was present and sang lead vocal for their several auditions. They were managed by Gary Usher on their first two albums. In total, the band produced three studio albums between the years 1967 and 1969. These include The Peanut Butter Conspiracy Is Spreading, The Great Conspiracy, and For Children of All Ages. Their albums were examples of psychedelic rock but were largely ignored outside Los Angeles. Within those years the band went through lineup changes, but Robison, along with Merrill and Brackett, remained the core of the group. As on all past material, Robison contributed vocals to the studio recordings.

The Peanut Butter Conspiracy charted once on the Billboard Hot 100 with their single "It's A Happening Thing", which featured Robison sharing vocals in harmonies. It was associated with the flower power era and charted number 93 nationally. This single appeared on their debut album, The Peanut Butter Conspiracy Is Spreading, in 1967. The album itself peaked at number 196, nationally. Although the band never charted again nationally, tracks suh as "Too Many Do", which featured Robison, were historical for being among the first songs to receive airplay even though it was beyond the three-minute conventional track length.

Live performances for Robison and the band were opposite to that of their debut album. The group would prolong their songs with guitar solos and they proved to be more experimentally psychedelic. In venues such as the Whisky a Go Go and the Fillmore Auditorium, the band opened for groups including Big Brother and the Holding Company and Jefferson Airplane. Live performances proved to be the highlight of the band for the rest of their existence. Robison and her bandmates, however, only ever became a local Los Angeles interest and they broke up in 1970.

=== Later events ===
Later in 1970, Robison was involved in multiple soundtracks for movies. Her most prominent work came with her providing backing vocals and main vocal parts, with Lynn Carey of Mama Lion, on six tracks for the soundtrack of the musical melodrama Beyond the Valley of the Dolls. She was included on "Find It", "In The Long Run", "Sweet Talkin' Candyman", "Come with the Gentle People", and "Look Up at the Bottom". The song "Once I Had Love" was mentioned in the film but not heard. It is available on the LP and on a CD (see Discography).

Additional work was completed by Robison along with Brackett and Merrill on the 1971 film Jud. It was the first time the ex-bandmates performed together since the band disbanded. While she was working on her soundtrack commitments, Robison joined the Los Angeles counterculture-inspired musical production, Hair. The musical was critically acclaimed and controversial for its profanity, nudity, and the depiction of the use of illegal drugs. She performed in lead roles for an 18-month stint. Robison continued to be involved in sessions of Hair even after she and Merrill had begun performing as a duo in local clubs.

In September 1971, Robison along with Merrill and Brackett joined a covers band named Froggy. The group was based in Pasadena, California, in a club called the Handlebar. Returning from jam sessions in early 1972, Robison was seriously injured in a car crash. She was unconscious for four days, but still returned in less than a month to perform with the band again. Robison moved to Glendora, California, and formed a band called Rush and began touring in state and in Arizona in mid-1973. This band included keyboardist Ivan Jean. After Rush dissolved, the two became a duo who toured in clubs across the country for years to come.

=== Death ===
On April 6, 1988, Robison was performing in Butte, Montana. During her concert, she fell ill and was transported to a hospital in Billings, Montana. Robison did not recover, and died sixteen days later on April 22, at the age of 42, from what was ascertained as bacterial infection causing a toxic shock.

In 2014, Al Brackett self-released a compilation album entitled Barbara. The album is a tribute to Robison's career in the years 1966 to 1970 with and without the Peanut Butter Conspiracy.

== Discography ==
The Young Swingers

- "Love Her Everyday" b/w "Or Else You'll Cry"
- "Wind's Up High" b/w "Let's Take Our Love"

The Ashes

- "Is There Anything I Can Do?" b/w "Every Little Prayer"
- "Dark on You Now" b/w "Roses Gone"

The Peanut Butter Conspiracy

- The Peanut Butter Conspiracy Is Spreading – 1967
- The Great Conspiracy – 1967
- For Children of All Ages – 1969
- Various – Angels From Hell (Original Motion Picture Soundtrack) 1968 (CD 2011 + LP New release)

Posthumous

- Spreading from the Ashes – 2005
- Living Dream – The Best of the Peanut Butter Conspiracy – 2005
- Barbara – 2014

=== Soundtrack ===
- Stu Phillips – Beyond The Valley Of The Dolls - The Original Soundtrack - 2004 - with the original film songs, Barbara "Sandi" Robison and Lynn Carey sing as bonus tracks. (CD + LP) Released by Soundtrack Classics - SCL 1408 and Harkit Records - HRKCD 8032.
- Various – Beyond The Valley Of The Dolls / Groupie Girl (Original Motion Picture Soundtracks - Label: Screen Gold Records - SGLDCD00010) - with the song "Once I Had Love"-1997 (CD), sung by Lynn Carey and Barbara Robison-For this CD one had sampled from the vinyl LP from 1970. Then there are not all original versions on the CD, but the new recordings with Ami Rushes and we only hear Barbara on two songs. For legal reasons, Lynn Carey was not allowed to sing for the LP recordings. But since 2004 there are also vinyl editions with the original film recordings, Lynn Carey and Barbara Robison can be heard in the film, not Ami Rushes.

The six original versions, sung by Lynn Carey and Barbara "Sandi" Robison: "Find It", "In The Long Run", "Sweet Talkin' Candyman", "Come with the Gentle People", "Look On Up at the Bottom", "Once I Had Love"
