= Randy Nauert =

American surf music and culture entrepreneur (1945–2019)

- Born: Charles Randolph Nauert; January 1, 1945; Palos Verdes Estates, California, United States
- Died: February 7, 2019 (aged 74) Malibu, California, United States
- Genres: Surf music; Folk rock; Psychedelic folk; Pop rock
- Instrument: Bass guitar
- Years active: 1960–2019
- Labels: Vault Records; GNP; Rhino Records; World Pacific; Sundazed; Fantasy; Teichiku Records (Union)

Randy Nauert (pronounced "Nort"; January 1, 1945 – February 7, 2019) was an American surf music and culture entrepreneur. He started in the music business as a bass player who played with The Bel-Airs and took his experience to broader appeal with The Challengers who were in the forefront of the surf music explosion in Southern California. He also worked as a composer, arranger, music manager, producer and music publisher. He is well known as being one of the first pioneers of surf music.

== Overview ==
Randy Nauert was a surf music pioneer. He enjoyed surfing and playing his bass guitar in bands during his school years. He taught Rick Griffin how to surf. In 1960, the first professional band he played in was named The Bel-Airs and in late 1962 he co-founded The Challengers. They produced a smash hit album titled “Surfbeat” released in January 1963. “Surfbeat” took the California Sound and surf music to new levels of acceptance. It remains the best selling surf album of all time. His band released 15 Challengers albums throughout the sixties as well as 12 others recorded under different names for the US and foreign markets. He appeared on TV shows during the peak of surf music's heyday such as Hollywood A Go-Go, Surf's Up, The Lloyd Thaxton Show, American Bandstand and other local shows in the Los Angeles area. He also worked as a record producer through the rest of the 60's evolving with hot rod rock, folk rock, pop, rock and psychedelic rock music as they developed. Nauert continued in the music and film industry throughout the decades that followed.

== Death and legacy ==
Randy Nauert died on February 7, 2019, of a heart attack. Prior to his death, he endured prolonged suffering for over two months after the Woolsey Fire (11/8/2018 – 11/21/2018) while working on his personal fire-recovery efforts in the area in which he lived for many years. Nauert helped many known and unknown artists and was connected in many aspects of the music business. Nauert is known as a caring person who helped others and cared for his family and friends. He was a living history book for the communities he lived in and the music he helped pioneer in the exploding pop culture scene in 1960s Southern California. He adopted and raised many animals over his lifetime and educated others about their proper treatment He often posted pictures of his animals on Facebook.

== Credits (incomplete) ==
=== Bands and music ===
- The Bel-Airs
- The Surfaris
- The Challengers
- The Good Guys
- The Surfriders
- The Clee-Shays
- The De-Fenders

=== TV and film ===
- The 6.25 Show 1963 TV
- Celebrity Party 1963 TV
- Thank Your Lucky Stars 1964 TV
- The Lloyd Thaxton Show 1965 TV
- Hollywood A Go Go 1965-1966 TV
- American Bandstand 1965-1966 TV
- Kabriskie Point 1970 film soundtrack
- The Shack 2012 Film
- New Dimensions 2018 Film

== See also ==
- List of people from Malibu, California
