= Laramie (disambiguation) =

Laramie, Wyoming is a city in the United States.

Laramie may also refer to:

== Places ==
- Laramie (CTA Blue Line station), a former station on the Chicago Transit Authority's 'L' system
- Laramie (CTA station), a station on the Chicago Transit Authority's 'L' system
- Laramie County, Wyoming
- Missionary District of Laramie, later known as the Episcopal Diocese of Western Nebraska
- Laramie Mountains, a range of peaks in the Rocky Mountains in the states of Wyoming and Colorado in the United States
- Laramie River
- North Laramie River
- Laramie Formation, geological formation in Colorado
- Laramie Peak, mountain in Wyoming

== People ==
- Laramie Dean, American guitarist
- Jacques La Ramee (alt. spelling Jacques LaRamie), French fur trapper, who was killed near the river bearing his name

== Arts, entertainment, and media ==
- Laramie (film), 1949 western starring Charles Starrett
- Laramie (TV series), television series

== Brands and enterprises ==
- Laramie (cigarette), a brand of cigarette tube
- Laramie, a version of the Dodge Ram pickup
- Beretta Laramie, a revolver, replica of the Smith & Wesson Model 3

== Ships ==
- USNS Laramie (T-AO-203), a United States Navy fleet replenishment oiler in service with the Military Sealift Command since 1996
- USS Laramie (AO-16), a fleet replenishment oiler in commission in the United States Navy from 1921 to 1922 and from 1940 to 1945

== See also ==
- Larami, a toy company known for the Super Soaker water gun
- Fort Laramie (disambiguation)
- The Laramie Project (disambiguation)
