= Fort Laramie (disambiguation) =

Fort Laramie may refer to:

- Fort Laramie National Historic Site, a famous 19th-century trading post and U.S. Army fort in eastern Wyoming
- Fort Laramie, Wyoming, the modern town located near the fort site
- Fort Laramie (radio), a 1956 Western show
- Treaty of Fort Laramie (disambiguation), US treaties with Native Americans
  - Treaty of Fort Laramie (1851)
  - Treaty of Fort Laramie (1868)
- Revolt at Fort Laramie, a 1957 movie

== See also ==
- Fort Loramie, Ohio, a village in western Ohio, initially a frontier fort built by General Anthony Wayne in 1795
- Laramie (disambiguation), for persons and other uses
