= Surfbeat =

Studio album by The Challengers
- Released: January 1963
- Recorded: Late 1962
- Genre: Surf rock
- Length: 32:26
- Label: Vault
- Producer: Richard Delvy

The Challengers chronology
Surfbeat (1963)	Lloyd Thaxton Goes Surfing with The Challengers (1963)

Professional ratings
Review scores
Source	Rating
Allmusic	link
New Record Mirror	4/5 stars

Surfbeat was the first album recorded by the Los Angeles-based surf rock group The Challengers. They recorded the album in a 3½ hour session at the end of 1962. The album was released in early 1963 and became a huge hit, helping to propel the surf genre. It was sought by collectors for many years and gained great notoriety in the obscure surf market. In 1994, Sundazed records, a company with a lot of vintage surf at its disposal, released the album on CD with two bonus tracks.

The tracks are all old numbers that serve as the foundation for surf rock. Songs by The Fireballs and Duane Eddy are on the album. The Beach Boys' debut Surfin' Safari and Surfer's Choice, the debut from Dick Dale & His Del-Tones had been released just a few months before Surfbeat was recorded. Tracks from both are on this album.

Two tracks on the album, "Vampire" and "Kami-Kaze" are actually recordings by The Bel-Airs, the band that the Challengers formed out of. The guitarists and saxophonist are the only differences in line-up. The two songs were written cowritten by Bel-Airs guitarist Paul Johnson, who remained close to the band, later playing with them on other projects. The album also includes a cover of The Bel-Airs' "Mr. Moto", the short-lived group's only hit.

== Track listing ==
1. Bulldog (Tomsco) – 1:53
2. Kami-Kaze (Johnson)– 2:19
3. Let's Go Trippin' (Dale) – 1:48
4. Ramrod (Casey)– 1:34
5. Mr. Moto (Delvy/Johnson) – 2:05
6. Red River Rock (King/Mack/Mendleson) – 1:56
7. Miserlou (Tauber/Rubanis/Leeds) – 2:44
8. Latin'ia (Nunes/Miller)– 2:29
9. Surfin' Safari (Wilson/Love) – 2:20
10. Movin' & Groovin' (Hazlewood/Eddy) – 2:08
11. Vampire (Delvy/Johnson) – 3:03
12. Torquay (Tomsco) – 2:41

Bonus Tracks:

13. Penetration (Leonard) 3:33

14. Surf Beat (Delvy's Drums) (Dale) 2:11

== Personnel ==
- Glenn Grey: lead guitar (except on #2 and #11)
- Don Landis: rhythm guitar (except on #2 and #11)
- Jim Roberts: piano and organ
- Randy Nauert: bass guitar
- Richard Delvy: drums
- Nick Hefner: saxophone (on #9 only)
- Paul Johnson: lead guitar (on #2 and #11)
- Eddie Bertrand: rhythm guitar (on #2 and #11)
- unknown: saxophone (on #2 and #11)
