= The Peanut Butter Conspiracy Is Spreading =

Studio album by the Peanut Butter Conspiracy
- Released: March 1967
- Recorded: December 1966 – January 1967
- Studio: Columbia, Hollywood
- Genre: Psychedelic rock; psychedelic pop
- Length: 34:00
- Label: Columbia
- Producer: Gary Usher

The Peanut Butter Conspiracy chronology
The Peanut Butter Conspiracy Is Spreading (1967)	The Great Conspiracy (1967)

Singles from The Peanut Butter Conspiracy Is Spreading
- 1. "It's a Happening Thing" Released: January 16, 1967; 2. "Dark on You Now" Released: March 20, 1967

Professional ratings
Review scores
Source	Rating
AllMusic	3/5 stars

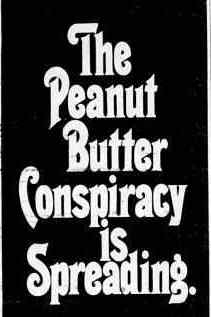
prerelease advertisement for the album

The Peanut Butter Conspiracy Is Spreading is the debut studio album by the Los Angeles psychedelic rock band, the Peanut Butter Conspiracy. It was released in March 1967 under the Columbia label.

Backed by producer Gary Usher, the band recorded one of the first instances of symphonic rock. The album utilizes vocal harmonies, and it takes influence from the psychedelic rock bands of the era. The band's style drew comparisons to The Mamas and the Papas, but the band also developed their own sound through intricate melodies and progressions that were both dark and optimistic. For recording, James Burton and Glen Campbell guested, providing backing guitar to bolster the group's sound. Later, band members reflected on the experience and disavowed their first album for the lack of studio session control they had.

Included on the album is the band's only charting single, "It's a Happening Thing", which became a favorite regionally when it charted in the KHJ Boss 30 in March 1967 and topped at number 93 on the national Billboard Hot 100. The track "Dark On You Now" was originally recorded when the band was still called The Ashes in 1966 on Vault Records. This earlier version had a slower tempo compared to the latter version. Overall, the album gained local interest in Los Angeles and charted at number 196 on the Billboard 200.

== Track listing ==
Side One
No.	Title	Writer(s)	Length
1.	"It's a Happening Thing"	Alan Brackett	2:26
2.	"Then Came Love"	John Merrill	3:44
3.	"Twice Is Life"	Merrill	2:50
4.	"Second Hand Man"	Daniel Walter Dalton	3:26
5.	"You Can't Be Found"	Brackett	2:47
6.	"Why Did I Get So High"	Brackett	2:10

Side Two
No.	Title	Writer(s)	Length
1.	"Dark on You Now"	Merrill	2:21
2.	"The Market Place"	Lance Fent	4:04
3.	"You Should Know"	Merrill	2:12
4.	"The Most Up Till Now"	Brackett	2:36
5.	"You Took Too Much"	Merrill	2:09

== Personnel ==
=== Peanut Butter Conspiracy ===
- Barbara "Sandi" Robison – lead vocals, percussion
- Alan Brackett – bass guitar
- Lance Fent – lead guitar
- John Merrill – rhythm guitar
- Jim Voight – drums

=== Additional musicians ===
- James Burton – guitar
- Glen Campbell – guitar

=== Technical ===
- Gary Usher – producer
- Lawrence Dietz – liner notes

== Charts ==
=== Album ===
Chart (1967)	Peak position
US Billboard 200	196

=== Single ===
Year	Single	US Billboard Hot 100
1967	"It's a Happening Thing"	93
1967	"Dark on You Now"	
