= The Challengers (band) =

American instrumental surf rock band

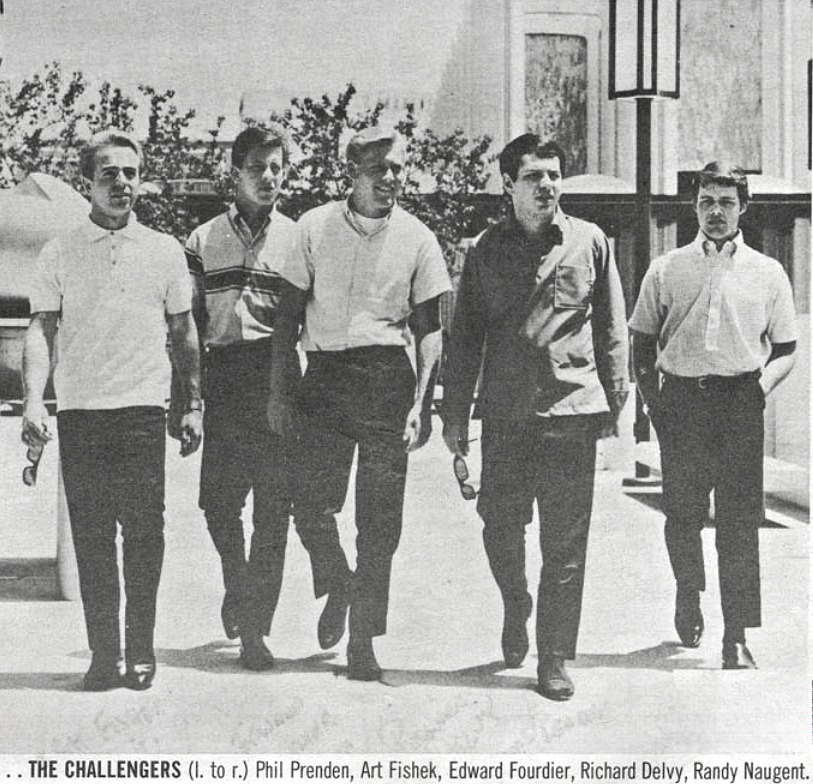
- Circa 1965

Background information
- Origin: Los Angeles, California, United States
- Genres: Surf; folk rock; psychedelic folk; pop rock
- Years active: 1962–1970
- Labels: Vault, GNP, Rhino, World Pacific, Sundazed, Fantasy, Teichiku Records (Union)

The Challengers were an instrumental surf music band started in Los Angeles, California, in late 1962. They represented a growing love for surf music and helped make the genre popular. Their debut album, Surfbeat, was the biggest-selling surf album of all time and helped bring surf music from California to the rest of the world.

== Overview ==
The band was formed out of the pioneer surf band called The Bel-Airs. The Bel-Airs were still in high school at the time, but scored a hit with an instrumental song titled "Mr. Moto". Their potential was cited by many, but it was an argument about use of the then new Fender reverb unit that led to their breakup. The Bel-Airs were originally formed by two guitarists, Eddie Bertrand and Paul Johnson, both 16 years old at the time they recorded "Mr. Moto". In early 1963, Eddie Bertrand heard Dick Dale using the Fender reverb unit and wanted to start incorporating heavy reverb into The Bel-Airs songs. He felt reverb was the sound that would come to define surf music. Even at 17, Johnson was something of an independent thinker and told Bertrand that The Bel-Airs had done quite well without reverb and he didn't see any reason at all to begin using it. The argument escalated until Bertrand finally left the band which then broke up for good shortly after. Johnson confirmed this story in the liner notes he contributed to The Bel-Airs reunion album released in 1986.

== Early years ==
During their peak years, from late 1960 to Summer 1963, The Bel-Airs had two drummers who played gigs with the band alternately, original Mouseketeer, Dick Dodd (Eddie & the Showmen and The Standells) and a local school friend named Richard Delvy. Delvy saw value in publishing, promoting and recording and began a career of managing and producing surf music. He then ultimately recorded numerous Southern California bands in the latter part of the 1960s. Since the 60's Delvy has produced many different musical artists and has made music management his lifelong passion.

The year before The Bel-Airs breakup, Richard Delvy left The Bel-Airs to form a new band called The Challengers. He brought in bassist Randy Nauert and keyboardist Jim Roberts who had played with The Bel-Airs. Delvy later brought in guitarist Art Fisher who had played with The Bel-Airs during the recording of The Challengers third album On The Move. Delvy also recruited Glenn Grey (lead guitar), Don Landis (rhythm guitar) and Nick Hefner (saxophone). They played at many high schools and many local dances and clubs. They eventually earned enough money to rent a recording studio, "World Pacific" to start recording. In about three and a half hours, they had an album titled Surfbeat. Saxophonist Nick Hefner played on only one track.

Surfbeat was released in January 1963 on Vault Records and quickly went up the charts. Just months earlier, The Beach Boys released a vocal single called "Surfin' Safari". Some months before The Challenger's Surfbeat release, surf music icon Dick Dale's first album Surfers' Choice was released. Surfbeat contained songs that were early influences on surf music, including songs first recorded by The Fireballs and Duane Eddy. In the early years Rick Griffin contributed cartoons of the band that appeared on their albums and a fan oriented "Challengers Band Cartoon Book". He later became well known for his work creating psychedelic poster art later in the 1960s.

The original group released a second album titled Lloyd Thaxton Goes Surfing With The Challengers with the benefit of being associated with the popular teen television show host Lloyd Thaxton.

== Years of success ==
The Challengers moved on and continued to record albums. During the recording of their third album On The Move, Hefner, Grey, Roberts and Landis all left the band. Richard Delvy and Randy Nauert remained. Art Fisher and Ed Fournier filled two guitar spots and Phil Pruden came in on saxophone. Delvy, Fisher and Fournier also contributed to song compositions for the group.

In 1964, they released their hit album K-39. The title track became a big hit and is one of their best known songs. The group continued their successful career, recording several albums a year, shocking by today's "one album every two years" pattern. They also had their own TV show called "Surf's Up!" hosted by Stan Richards in 1965-66 and appeared frequently on another dance show called "Hollywood A Go-Go" hosted by Sam Riddle in 1965–66. Saxophonist Phil Pruden left the group starting with the release of California Kicks in 1966 making The Challengers a four piece guitar driven group for the remainder of their run. During this time the group and surf music popularity overseas in Japan and other countries was exploding. This led to the creation of four more groups with members from The Challengers: The Surfriders, The Good Guys, The Clee-Shays and The De-Fenders all produced albums for these foreign markets.

In addition, The Challengers produced some tracks for the car and hot rod music scene that was gaining popularity in the US on the heels of the surf craze. Delvy could see a music trend coming and capture it at just the right time. Although primarily an instrumental band, the group added vocals to the following albums as all band members could also sing:

At The Teenage Fair
The Man From U.N.C.L.E.
Challengers A Go Go
Light My Fire With Classical Gas

In the mid to late 1960s, as music changed, so did The Challengers. They began recording more pop-oriented music, like an instrumental version of "Kicks" by Paul Revere & The Raiders, "Light My Fire" by The Doors, "The Man from U.N.C.L.E" from the TV show and many others. By 1967, they had gone the way of most other surf bands and stopped performing live, but still continued recording and releasing albums. Their album Billy Strange & The Challengers brought the collaboration of another fine guitarist from the GNP Crescendo label to work with The Challengers.

A 1973 greatest hits release of the band was fittingly titled Where Were You In The Summer Of '62?.

== Later years and reunion ==
The Challengers were seen in a few of 1980s surf band reunion concerts. Richard Delvy always kept in contact with his bandmates. His surf band history was extensive and he maintained his friendships with his former Bel-Airs guitarist Paul Johnson (PJ and the Galaxies) and Eddie Bertrand (Eddie & the Showmen). In 1992 a local surf company owned by Brad Jennings (The Early Sixties Company) signed an exclusive contract with Richard Delvy to reproduce the Challengers band LP covers and Rick Griffin artwork for tee shirts and surf related products. That successful relationship is still going on today through Richard's estate.

In 1994, after 24 years without new recordings, The Challengers reunited with some new members to release the album New Wave produced by band leader and founder Richard Delvy. Paul Johnson graciously joined the group to play guitar and composed. Art Fisher played guitar on "Mr. Moto", Ed Fournier contributed a new song he wrote and Richard Delvy plays drums on the new tracks. It was released on compact disc on the independent label Atmospheres. Richard Delvy died on February 6, 2010, ending his lifelong influence on music in the Los Angeles area. Bassist Randy Nauert died on February 7, 2019.

== Selected discography ==
The Challengers
Year	Album (Label)
1963	Surfbeat (Vault LP-100; reissue: Sundazed 6029)
1963	Lloyd Thaxton Goes Surfing With The Challengers (Vault LP-101; reissue: Sundazed 6030)
1963	On The Move (Surfing Around The World) (Vault LP-102; reissue: Sundazed 6031)
1964	K-39 (Vault LP-107; reissue: Sundazed 6032)
1964	The Challengers Go Sidewalk Surfing! (Triumph TR-100; reissue: Sundazed 6091)
1965	At The Teenage Fair (GNP Crescendo 2010)
1965	The Man From U.N.C.L.E. (GNP Crescendo 2018)
1965	Surf's Up! The Challengers On TV (Vault LP-109)
1966	California Kicks (GNP Crescendo 2025)
1966	Billy Strange & The Challengers (GNP Crescendo 2030)
1966	Wipe Out! (GNP Crescendo 2031)
1966	Challengers A Go Go [live] (Vault LP-110)
1967	25 Greatest Instrumental Hits (GNP Crescendo 609) 2-LP
1968	Light My Fire With Classical Gas (GNP Crescendo 2045)
1970	Vanilla Funk (GNP Crescendo 2056)
1994	New Wave (Atmospheres ATD-101)

== Compilations ==
- Challengers' Greatest Hits (Vault LP-111, 1967)
- Where Were You In The Summer Of '62? (Fantasy F-9443, 1973) reissue of Challengers' Greatest Hits
- The Best Of The Challengers (Rhino RNLP-053, 1982)
- Killer Surf! The Best Of The Challengers (GNP Crescendo 2229, 1994)
- Tidal Wave! (Rarities, Alternate Versions & Unissued Cuts) (Sundazed 11024, 1995)
