= For Children of All Ages =

Studio album by The Peanut Butter Conspiracy
- Released: 1969
- Recorded: 1969
- Studios: Hollywood Recorders, Los Angeles, California
- Genres: Psychedelic rock; psychedelic pop
- Length: 31:26
- Label: Challenge
- Producer: Alan Brackett

The Peanut Butter Conspiracy chronology
The Great Conspiracy (1967)	For Children of All Ages (1969)	Spreading from the Ashes (2005)

Singles from For Children of All Ages
- 1. "Back in L.A." Released: August 1969

Professional ratings
Review scores
Source	Rating
AllMusic	2/5 stars

For Children of All Ages is the third and final album by the American psychedelic rock band the Peanut Butter Conspiracy (PBC), and was released on Challenge Records, in 1969 (see 1969 in music). The album came after the band's contract with Columbia Records expired and bassist Alan Brackett took it upon himself to be the record producer during recording sessions.

The material on the album was originally intended as a side-project initiated by Brackett. Brackett composed the majority of the tracks during the PBC's 1968 touring schedule, and brought the songs to the recording studio Hollywood Recorders to record demos. Producer Dave Burgess was impressed by the resulting recordings, and encouraged more polished works, by instituting an eight-track and increasing the projects budget. A revamped lineup included former Clear Light members, organist Ralph Schuckett, and drummer Michael Ney. For Children of All Ages was released in 1969, but failed to chart nationally. The album was the first and only release by the band to not credit vocalist Barbara Robison as "Sandi Peanut Butter", but rather by her actual name. The PBC toured into 1970, however, thorough a combination of changing musical tastes and personnel indifferences, the group could not expand beyond their following in Los Angeles and disbanded in 1970.

== Track listing ==
=== Side one ===
1. "Now" (Alan Brackett) – 3:13
2. "The Loudness of Your Silence" (Dick Monda, Jill Jones) – 2:50
3. "It's Alright" (Brackett) – 3:32
4. "What Did I Do Wrong?" (Brackett) – 2:17
5. "Out in the Cold Again" (Monda, Keith Colley) – 2:36

=== Side two ===
1. "Back in L.A." (Brackett) – 3:13
2. "Gonna Get You Home" (Brackett) – 5:01
3. "Have a Little Faith" (Brackett) – 2:48
4. "Try Again" (Brackett) – 2:51
5. "Think" (Brackett) – 3:04

== Personnel ==
=== The Peanut Butter Conspiracy ===
- Barbara Robison – vocals
- Alan Brackett – bass guitar, vocals
- Ralph Schuckett – organ, piano
- Michael Ney – drums (tracks 7–9)
- Pete McQueen – drums (all tracks except 7–9)
- John Merrill – guitar, vocals

=== Technical ===
- Alan Brackett – producer
- Jim Gordon – string and brass arrangements
- Tom Perry – engineer
- Studio Five, Inc. – cover design
