= People Get Ready (The Chambers Brothers album) =

Live album by the Chambers Brothers
- Released: 1966
- Recorded: 1965
- Venues: Ash Grove, Los Angeles
- Label: Vault 9003
- Producers: Ed Michel; Engineer: Wally Heider

The Chambers Brothers chronology
People Get Ready (1966)	The Time Has Come (1967)

People Get Ready was a live album for The Chambers Brothers. It represents recordings that the group made in 1965. It was released on the Vault label in 1966.

== Background ==
The album was produced by Ed Michel who, in the past a house bassist at the Ash Grove club. People Get Ready was one of the first albums he cut in the club. Producer Michel was a friend of Vault Records director Jack Lewark. According to Michel, Lewark wanted to have an album of The Chambers Brothers recorded. Apparently, the request was made at the last minute. Michel said he'd do it and got hold of Wally Heider who ran everything from his station wagon. They parked the vehicle in the alley behind the Ash Grove, and they were ready to record the Chambers Brothers live. About three-quarters into the recording, Heider informed Michel that the tape machine had issues and that they couldn't use the tape. When the Chambers Brothers finished their set, Michel explained to them that they couldn't use the recording. He said to the group, "The set you just did was a rehearsal" and told them to do it again. The Chambers Brothers informed the audience what was going on and performed another set which, in the mind of the producer was a better performance.

The album was released on Vault 9003 in 1966. The recordings were said to be from Los Angeles and Boston. The musicians on the album were, Joe Chambers, Willie Chambers, Lester Chambers, George Chambers and Mike Konnic.

- Even though the album's liner notes by Elliot Tiegel say that the album was recorded at both the Ash Grove in Los Angeles and the Unicorn in Boston, Ed Michel believed that all of the recording was done at the Ash Grove. Richie Unterberger's website says that Michel didn't think that the drummer on the album was Brian Keenan. He believed it was, "a kid who lived somewhere up Laurel Canyon, a young rock'n'roll drummer". A 2017 email from Thurman Watts, the co-author of Lester Chambers' biography said that according to Lester Chambers, the drummer on the Ash Grove recording is Jesse (Nicky) Cahn, who is son of folk & jazz-blues singer Barbara Dane and folk musician Rolf Cahn. However, in Blues Records, A Complete Guide to 20 Years of Recorded Blues, By Mike Leadbitter and Neil Slaven, the drummer is said to be Mike Konnic, a drummer who according to Joe Chambers, was with them when they got to Newport, and had an argument with the brothers at one stage.

== Reception ==
The album was reviewed in the 23 April 1966 issue of Cash Box with the reviewer saying that the group's harmonies were surefooted and the instrumental sound was funky and infectious. The songs singled out for mention were "People Get Ready", "Call Me" and "Hooka Tooka". The reviewer also said that it should delight and excite the listener and it had an appeal to those who are fans of rock, blues or just top music.

The album was reviewed in Vladimir Bogdanov's All Music Guide to Soul where it was given three stars. Bruce Eder said that the group sounded a little but surer on the basic blues numbers than some of the R&B that they covered. He said that they did a beautiful job on harmonizing on the Curtis Mayfield song, "People Get Ready" and their displaying a command on the poppier side of rock & roll with their composition "Call Me" with its "Hang on Sloopy" style riff. He finished off with saying that the album with its companion release "Now" were good low cost introductions to The Chambers Brothers who in that time were a commanding exciting stage presence.

The album was one of the four Chambers Brothers albums revisited in the 14 February 2008 edition of PopMatters. The reviewer noted that the Chambers Brothers refused to be defined by one genre. Even though the genre-crossing produced some awkward moments, the group was never out of their element. The wicked rhythm guitar of Willie Chambers being meshed with George Chambers’ languid bass and Lester Chambers' blues-tinged harmonica inciting the audience and their approval was also noted.

== Later years ==
It was reported on the Soul Tracks website that on 31 October 2007, Collectors’ Choice Music was to reissue four out-of-print early Chambers Brothers albums. They were, People Get Ready, Now, Shout! and Feelin' the Blues.

== Track listing ==
People Get Ready Vault 9003
No.	Track	Composer	Time	Notes
A1	"Yes Yes Yes"	J. Reed	3:20	
A2	"Tore Up"	H. Ballard	3:00	
A3	"Reconsider Baby"	L. Fulsom	4:45	
A4	"You've Got Me Running"	J. Reed	3:05	
A5	"People Get Ready"	C. Mayfield	2:30	
A6	"Money (That's What I Want)"	B. Gordy Jr., J. Bradford	2:53	
B1	"You Can Run"	J. Taylor	3:35	
B2	"Hooka Tooka"	Arranged by J. Chambers, W. Chambers	2:50	
B3	"Call Me"	J. Chambers, W. Chambers	3:15	
B4	"Summertime"	H. Dubose, G. Gershwin	4:10	
B5	"Your Old Lady"	Curtis, Glick, Isley	2:50	
B6	"It's All Over Now"	B. Womack, S. Womack	5:41	

== Also released on ==
List of releases
Title	Catalogue	Year	Format	Notes
People Get Ready	Vault 825-9003	1966	8-Track Cartridge	United States
People Get Ready	Reo RLPS 694	1966	Vinyl, LP, Album	Canada
People Get Ready	Vocalion VA-L 8058	1966	Vinyl, LP, Album	UK
