= Now (The Chambers Brothers album) =

1967 live album by the Chambers Brothers

Now!

Live album by The Chambers Brothers
- Released: 1967
- Label: Vault SLP-115

Now! is a live album by The Chambers Brothers that was released on the Vault label in 1967. It came out some time after the recordings were made.

== Background ==
Now! which was released on Vault SLP-115 in 1967 was the group's second album for the label, with the first being People Get Ready for the Fabulous Chambers Brothers.

According to Soul Tracks, Now! was recorded at the Ash Grove and Unicorn clubs.

== Reception ==
The record had a positive review in the 26 August issue of Billboard where it was a R&B Special Merit Pick. The live quality of the album was praised with "What'd I Say" mentioned as an example of how the group was in top form. Other songs mentioned were, the group's own composition, "It's Groovin' Time", "C.C. Rider" and "High Heel Sneakers".

The album was reviewed it the 26 August issue of Cash Box. It was positive with the reviewer writing that the group was heard at their best on this recording. The reviewer also wrote that it should stir up lots of reaction with the consumer.

The album was given a three-star rating by the All Music Guide to Soul.

According to PopMatters in 2008, the standout tracks on the album were, "High Heel Sneakers", "Long Tall Sally", "What'd I Say", and "It’s Groovin Time".

== Later years ==
The album, along with the other three Vault albums by the Chambers Brothers was released on compact disc on the Collectors’ Choice Music label.

== Track listing ==
=== Side A ===
1. "Introduction To"
2. "High Heel Sneakers"
3. "Baby Please Don't Go"
4. "What'd I Say"
5. "Long Tall Sally"

=== Side B ===
1. "Bony Maronie"
2. "It's Groovin' Time"
3. "You Don't Have to Go"
4. "C.C. Rider"
5. "So Fine"
