= Shout! (The Chambers Brothers album) =

Studio album and live album by the Chambers Brothers
- Released: 1968
- Length: 36:22
- Label: Vault SP-120

Shout! is a 1968 album by the Chambers Brothers. It is made up from material recorded earlier when the group was signed to the Vault Records label.

== Background ==
The album was released on Vault SLP-120 in 1968. The cover does not represent the time of the recordings which were done in 1966. The picture of the group is from the Frost Amphitheatre at Stanford in the summer of 1968. The show was opened by the Santana Blues Band. Carlos Santana, wearing a blue shirt can be seen on the cover at the right of the stage.

According to Joe Chambers, the group was puzzled as to why Vault Records used Columbia photography on their albums. He also said that Brian Keenan wasn't with the group when they recorded for Vault. But one track, "Love Me Like The Rain" has Keenan credited as the composer. However, Keenan was a member of the Ondine night club house band, The Losers which was formed around 1965. The group released a single, "Mersey-ssippi" bw "Love Me Like The Rain" on the Atco label in 1965. Keenan was the composer for both sides. The Chambers Brothers did have an early drummer called Mike Konnic. He played on their People Get Ready album which was released on the Vault label. It was when the group got to Newport that Konnic got into an argument with the group and seemed to want to fight them. The group was backed by Sam Lay on their first set at Newport. Impressed by lay's "Big Sound", George Chambers asked him to back them on another set. After Newport, the group had Jesse Cahn as their drummer a period of time. According to Cahn in a 2023 article by Mojo, he started playing drums with them shortly after Newport. (1965) It is possible that Cahn may be the drummer on some tracks.

The album found a re-release years later on the Collectors' Choice label.

== Reception ==
The album was reviewed in the 14 December 1968 issue of Record World. The reviewer wrote that there were a lot of beats in the package and the eleven minute medley of "I Got It" and "Shout" was referred to as one of the best things they had done.

The record was reviewed in the 14 December issue of Cash Box. The disc was said to present the group in their formative stages and captured the group in a moving live performance. The reviewer also wrote that fans of the Chambers Brothers would want the record.

The album was rated three-and-a-half stars by AllMusic.

Along with the Chambers Brothers' other Vault albums, Shout! was mentioned in a 2008 article about the group's vault recordings by Pop Matters. The writer pointed out why Rolling Stone critic Gary Von Tersch found the recordings so valuable. One example was "Rained the Day You Left" which was said to melt your heart.

== Track listing ==
=== Side A ===
1. "Johnny B. Good", (Chuck Berry) - 3:00
2. "Blues Get Off My Shoulder" - 5:00
3. " I Got It", (P.D.)
4. "Shout", (R. Isley-R. Isley-O. Isley) - 11:00

=== Side B ===
1. "There She Goes", (W. M. Chambers) - 3:15
2. "Seventeen", (J. Chambers) - 3:15
3. "Pretty Girls", (E. Church-T. Williams) - 2:45
4. "Rained The Day You Left", (J. Chambers) - 3:05
5. "So Fine", (J. Otis) - 2:05
6. "Love Me Like the Rain", (B. Keenan) - 4:45
