= Electric Johnny & his Skyrockets =

Dutch instrumental rock band

- Origin: Rotterdam, Netherlands
- Genres: Instrumental rock; surf rock; indorock
- Years active: 1958–1968
- Labels: CNR
- Past members: Jan Schouten; Dan Schouten; Cor Schouten; Henk Schouten; Roy Michaels; Gerrit Krause; Harold de Groot; Frans Huysmans; Willem Grift

Electric Johnny & his Skyrockets were a Dutch instrumental rock band from Rotterdam. The group was formed in 1958 by Jan "Johnny" Schouten with his brothers and became part of the Netherlands' indorock scene of the 1960s.

== History ==
Jan Schouten was born in Bandung, Indonesia on 20 September 1933, and later immigrated with his family to Rotterdam, where he began working as an electrician, earning the nickname "Electric Johnny". 1958 he formed the Skyrockets with his brothers Dan, Cor and Henk. The group eventually signed with CNR Records, and in 1959 they released their debut single, "Black Eyes Rock / Johnny on his Strings", which became a hit record in the Netherlands.

The Schouten brothers would soon be joined by guitarist Roy Michaels and drummer Harold de Groot, and continued to see national success throughout the early 1960s. Though they were initially an instrumental rock and surf band, they began to incorporate elements of Latin music into their sound with the addition of Frans Huysmans on percussion, creating a distinct style dubbed by some as "South American rock". In addition to their success in the Netherlands, the Skyrockets' singles would also be released internationally in North America, the United Kingdom, France, and Sweden.

In 1961, Huysmans died, and Michaels left the group. De Groot left in 1963, and the group added a vocalist, Willem Grift, shortly thereafter. This four-piece lineup would make up the band until its eventual disbandment in 1968.

== Discography ==
Singles:

- "Black Eyes Rock"/"Johnny on his Strings" (CNR, 1959)
- "Johnny's Beat"/"Swanee River" (CNR, 1960)
- "Rocky Road Blues"/"Please Come Back" (CNR, 1960)
- "Isle of Capri"/"Siboney" (CNR, 1961)
- "Should I"/"Gitarren Spielt Auf" (CNR, 1961)
- "La Golondrina"/"Guitar Humoresque" (CNR, 1962)
- "Begin the Beguine"/"Barcarolle" (CNR, 1963)

EPs:

- South-American Rock (CNR, 1960)
- South-American Rock, Vol. 2 (CNR, 1961)
- Fabulous Electric Johnny and his Skyrockets (CNR, 1962)
- The Skyrockets (CNR, 1963)

Albums:

- Johnny on his Strings (Diwa, 1974)
