= The Peanut Butter Conspiracy =

American rock band

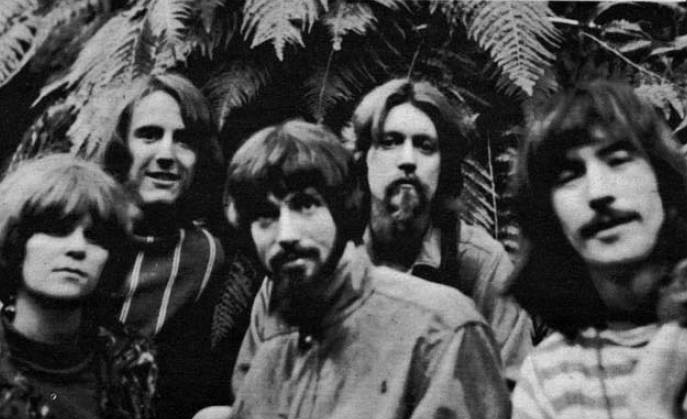
- The group in 1966. From left to right: Barbara Robison, John Merrill, Jim Voigt, Lance Fent, and Alan Brackett.

Background information
- Origin: Los Angeles, California, United States
- Genres: Psychedelic rock; psychedelic pop; freakbeat
- Years active: 1966–1970
- Labels: Columbia; Challenge
- Spinoff of: The Ashes
- Past members: John Merrill; Alan Brackett; Barbara "Sandi" Robison; Spencer Dryden; Lance Baker Fent; Jim Voigt; Bill Wolff; Ralph Schuckett; Michael Ney (Stevens)

The Peanut Butter Conspiracy was an American, Los Angeles-based, psychedelic pop/rock group from the 1960s. The band is known for lead singer Barbara Robison and for briefly having Spencer Dryden of Jefferson Airplane as a band member.

== History ==
The band formed in Los Angeles in August 1966 from the folk rock group The Ashes, which included John Merrill (guitar/vocals), Barbara "Sandi" Robison (vocals), Alan Brackett (bass/vocals), Spencer Dryden (drums), and Jim Cherniss (guitar/vocals). The group had earlier been known as The Young Swingers, who released two obscure singles. The Ashes released a first single on the Vault label in February 1966, "Is There Anything I Can Do?", written by Jackie DeShannon. Dryden left The Ashes (May 1966) to replace Skip Spence in Jefferson Airplane, Robison left (June 1966) to give birth, and the group temporarily disbanded. Alan Brackett hooked up with a new guitarist, Lance Baker Fent, and a new drummer, Jim Voigt, naming the new trio The Crossing Guards. Merrill and Robison rejoined and the five-piece band became The Peanut Butter Conspiracy.

The group signed with Columbia Records in late 1966, releasing a single, "It's A Happening Thing", produced by Gary Usher. It reached number 93 on the national pop chart. The band's first album, The Peanut Butter Conspiracy Is Spreading, followed. It was also produced by Usher, who brought in studio musicians including Glen Campbell and James Burton to bolster the group's sound. The album charted at number 196 on the Billboard 200. Their late 1967 single "Turn On a Friend (to the Good Life)" also failed to chart. However, they toured nationally with a new guitarist, Bill Wolff, and recorded a second album for Columbia, The Great Conspiracy. The group recorded songs for movies, including Angels from Hell, Run Angel Run, Jud, Cherry Harry and Raquel, Hell Ride, 2000 Years Later, and Beyond the Valley of the Dolls.

In 1968, they moved to the Warner Bros. Records subsidiary label Challenge with a revamped line-up featuring ex-Clear Light organist Ralph Schuckett and drummer Michael Ney (Stevens). They recorded their final album, For Children of All Ages, written and conceived by Brackett, in 1969. Meanwhile, Merrill had reformed a version of Ashes, whose only LP was eventually released in 1970 on the Vault label.

The Peanut Butter Conspiracy undertook a final tour and split up about 1970. Merrill and Brackett continued writing and producing for other artists. Brackett worked as a music publisher and produced Randy Meisner's first solo LP after leaving the Eagles. Brackett also produced, wrote and performed songs for scores of movies and television shows including Witness, Happy Days, and Top Gun.

Barbara "Sandi" Robison (born Barbara Jeanne Moyer, October 14, 1945, Las Vegas, Nevada) joined the Los Angeles production of the musical Hair for an 18-month stint. Afterwards, she continued performing locally. In September 1971, Robison, Merrill, and Brackett joined a band called Froggy, which worked in a local saloon in Pasadena, California. By late 1972, she joined another American band called Rush, which Merrill also joined. Here she worked with pianist Ivan Jean, whom she continued to tour with for years to come.

Robison fell ill while performing in Butte, Montana, and died of toxic shock poisoning 16 days later, on April 22, 1988, in a hospital in Billings, at the age of 42.

Jim Voigt (born September 24, 1946) died of a heart attack on November 7, 2000, at the age of 54.

Guitarist Fent continues to create rock and roll through his GreenManMedia label. The three surviving members of The Peanut Butter Conspiracy performed Brackett's song "Eventually" at Amoeba Records on September 22, 2009. The song was originally recorded in 1966 and is part of the Rhino box set Los Angeles Nuggets — Where the Action Is. Singer Karen Mitchell and drummer Jim Laspesa joined original members Brackett, Merrill and Fent in the re-formation of The Peanut Butter Conspiracy.

In 2005, Spreading From The Ashes was released on Ace Records in England. It covered the years that Merrill, Robison, and Brackett were together prior and during the time they were in the Peanut Butter Conspiracy, including songs by the Young Swingers and The Ashes and many songs previously unreleased by the PBC.

In 2014 a further CD was issued, Barbara, compiled by Brackett and featuring tracks recorded by Robison. It is a tribute to her life and her career. The album has a mixture of genres with the purpose of focusing on Robison's musical talents. Some diverse tracks include the psychedelic folk song "Shuffling Tune", bluesy "Fool Hearted Woman", and the vocal-pop song "Good Feelin'".

== Name ==
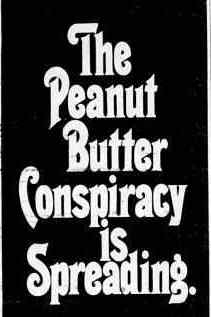
Advertisement for the band's first album

According to Brackett:

"I got together upon John's recommendation with Fent and Voigt and, with the help of Owsley, we learned 50 or so songs in one day and went out that night and got our choice of about three gigs in Hollywood. We played at the Sea Witch on Sunset Blvd. as the Crossing Guards. We were a power trio, and then John and Barbara joined back up with us and we changed our name to the PBC. The PBC was a name that Voigt came up with—actually it was the Peanut Butter Controversy originally, but we changed it to Conspiracy right away."

== Discography ==
=== Studio albums ===
Title	Album details	Peak chart positions
Title	Album details	US
The Peanut Butter Conspiracy Is Spreading	Released: March 1967; Label: Columbia Records	196
The Great Conspiracy	Released: December 1967; Label: Columbia Records	-
For Children of All Ages	Released: November 1969; Label: Challenge Records	-

=== Compilation albums ===
Title	Album details
West Coast Love-In (with The Chambers Brothers)	Released: 1967; Label: Vault Records
Turn On A Friend	Released: 1988; Label: Drop Out Records
Spreading from the Ashes (with The Ashes)	Released: 2005; Label: Ace Records
Living Dream - The Best of the Peanut Butter Conspiracy	Released: 2005; Label: Sundazed Music
Barbara (with Barbara Robison)	Released: 2014; Label: N/A
The Most Up Till Now - A History 1966-1970	Released: 2025; Label: Strawberry

=== Singles ===
The Ashes

Release date	Title	Record label	Peak chart positions	Album
Release date	Title	Record label	US	Album
February 1966	"Is There Anything I Can Do" b/w "Every Little Prayer"	Vault V-924	-	Non-album singles
1967	"Roses Gone" b/w "Dark On You Now"	Vault V-936	-	Non-album singles

==== The Peanut Butter Conspiracy ====
Release date	Title	Record label	Peak chart positions	Album
Release date	Title	Record label	US	Album
January 1967	"It's A Happening Thing" b/w "Twice Is Life"	Columbia 4-43985	93	The Peanut Butter Conspiracy Is Spreading
March 1967	"Dark On You Now" b/w "Then Came Love"	Columbia 4-44063	-	The Peanut Butter Conspiracy Is Spreading
May 1967	"Time Is After You" b/w "Floating Dream"	Vault V-933	-	Non-album single
October 1967	"Turn On A Friend (To The Good Life)" b/w "Captain Sandwich"	Columbia 4-44356	-	The Great Conspiracy
October 1968	"I'm A Fool" b/w "It's So Hard"	Columbia 4-44667	125	Non-album single
August 1969	"Back In L.A." b/w "Have A Little Faith"	Challenge 500	-	For Children of All Ages
