= The Laramie Project (disambiguation) =

The Laramie Project is a play by Moisés Kaufman that premiered in 2000.

The Laramie Project may also refer to:

- The Laramie Project (film), 2002 movie based on the play of the same name
- The Laramie Project: 10 Years Later, a 2009 sequel to the original play

== See also ==
- Laramie (disambiguation)
