= Spreading from the Ashes =

Compilation album by The Peanut Butter Conspiracy
- Released: May 11, 2005
- Recorded: 1966–1967
- Genre: Psychedelic rock; psychedelic pop; folk rock
- Length: 1:11:39
- Label: Big Beat

The Peanut Butter Conspiracy chronology
For Children of All Ages (1969)	Spreading from the Ashes (2005)	Living Dream - The Best of the Peanut Butter Conspiracy (2005)

Spreading from the Ashes is a compilation album by the Los Angeles psychedelic rock band The Peanut Butter Conspiracy (PBC). In total, there are 26 tracks composed of early work, from when the band was known as The Ashes as well as their beginnings as The Peanut Butter Conspiracy.

== Background ==
The Ashes were a folk rock group that briefly existed from 1965 to 1966. They released some singles on the Vault label that met with little success before disbanding in 1966. Three ex-members Alan Brackett, Barbara Robison, and John Merill along with newcomers Jim Foigt and Lance Fent formed the PBC in late 1966.

The compilation is composed of seven official releases by the PBC that were recorded within the years 1966 and 1967. This includes their time with Vault Records and the jump to the larger Columbia Records label. Another seven, both released and unreleased, were recorded under the group's previous band, The Ashes. This compilation marked the first time The Ashes' recordings are distributed on compact disc. The Ashes' recordings are more folk rock oriented compared to the PBC's psychedelic style that is associated with them. Remaining are out-takes, demo recordings, and live takes of PBC recordings that were not yet officially released. The one live track, "You Should Know", was recorded in 1967, and gives a different perspective on the band that their studio albums could not capture.

A twenty-page booklet of interviews and quotes from band members was written by Alec Palao and included in the album. The compilation was digitally re-released in 2013 by Ace Records.

== Track listing ==
1. The Ashes - Time Is After You 2:50
2. The Peanut Butter Conspiracy - Love's Last Ground 2:11
3. The Ashes - Is There Anything I Can Do 2:28
4. The Peanut Butter Conspiracy - Eventually 1:52
5. The Ashes - Dark on You Now 4:00
6. The Ashes - Winds Up High 2:15
7. The Peanut Butter Conspiracy - Free 2:59
8. The Peanut Butter Conspiracy - Big Bummer 2:45
9. The Peanut Butter Conspiracy - Light Bulb Blues 2:17
10. The Ashes - Let's Take Our Love 2:10
11. The Peanut Butter Conspiracy - Enchanted World 2:08
12. The Peanut Butter Conspiracy - I'm Falling 2:38
13. The Peanut Butter Conspiracy - Flight of the Psychedelic Bumble Bee 2:00
14. The Peanut Butter Conspiracy - Foolhearted Woman 3:16
15. The Peanut Butter Conspiracy - Shirley Can You Come Out and Play 2:47
16. The Peanut Butter Conspiracy - 1-9-6-7 1:59
17. The Ashes - So Lonely 2:57
18. The Peanut Butter Conspiracy - Floating Dream 2:10
19. The Peanut Butter Conspiracy - Shuffle Tune 2:15
20. The Peanut Butter Conspiracy - Moment of Happiness 1:41
21. The Ashes - Hangman 2:56
22. The Ashes - Roses Gone 2:48
23. The Peanut Butter Conspiracy - Make Someone Happy 2:06
24. The Peanut Butter Conspiracy - The Naturally (Wintry Ways) 4:26
25. The Peanut Butter Conspiracy - Taste of Something New 3:02
26. The Peanut Butter Conspiracy - You Should Know (Live) 5:37
