= The Great Conspiracy (album) =

Studio album by The Peanut Butter Conspiracy
- Released: December 1967
- Recorded: January 13 – September 1, 1967
- Studio: Columbia Records Studios, Sunset Blvd., Hollywood, California and Columbia Records Studios, New York City
- Genre: Psychedelic rock; psychedelic pop
- Length: 40:19
- Label: Columbia
- Producer: Gary Usher

The Peanut Butter Conspiracy chronology
The Peanut Butter Conspiracy Is Spreading (1967)	The Great Conspiracy (1967)	For Children of All Ages (1969)

Singles from The Great Conspiracy
- 1. "Time Is After You" Released: May 1967; 2. "Turn on a Friend (To the Good Life)" Released: October 24, 1967

Professional ratings
Review scores
Source	Rating
AllMusic	4/5 stars

The Great Conspiracy is the second studio album by the Los Angeles psychedelic rock band, The Peanut Butter Conspiracy (PBC) on Columbia Records in December 1967. Gary Usher, who produced their debut album, The Peanut Butter Conspiracy Is Spreading, was again the producer for this album. It was the last time the group released new material with Columbia as their contractual obligations were met. Their second album is regarded as the best of the group's outputs for its solidified sound in psychedelic music.

== Background ==
Recording sessions took place in Los Angeles, and New York City in the latter half of 1967 after the band completed touring for their debut album. Their 1967 national tour had the PBC opening in high-profile venues including the Fillmore Auditorium, and the Whisky a Go Go for contemporaries like Big Brother and the Holding Company and Jefferson Airplane. The band was influenced by those they opened for and it was reflected on their album. For recording, the band added guitarist Bill Wolff previously from the band, Sound Machine. The second recording by the PBC emphasized a reflection of their live performances compared to their pop-driven debut album. Eight of the eleven tracks extend beyond the three-minute limit conventional for songs of the period. These extended jams, most notably "Too Many Do" and "Ecstasy", most resemble the live experience of a PBC performance. "Too Many Do" became one of the first long cut recordings to be featured in extended radio play. Alan Brackett, regarding their extended tracks, said it was "something we enjoyed a lot and I wish we had done it more at the recording sessions". Many of the tracks include complex instrumental sections. Instrumentally, their sound was more experimental as the band included additional sound effects and distorted guitar solos, signatured by the chord stops and starts. Barbara Robison was limited to backing vocals on several tracks, and shared the singing duty with Al Brackett. However, when Robison did perform lead vocals, like on the track "Pleasure", she displayed a powerful voice with emotional integrity. Overall, the band's sound was more focused as they were allowed recording freedom.

== Release ==
The band released the album in December 1967 on the Columbia label. The Great Conspiracy charted in the lower 90s of the Los Angeles pop charts. Two singles, "Turn on a Friend" b/w "Captain Sandwich" and "I'm a Fool" b/w "It's So Hard" did not reach the top 100 in the national charts. Their single "I'm a Fool" proved to be the most successful of the tracks when it reached number 125 on the Bubbling Under portion of the Billboard Charts, thanks to extensive west coast radio play. "I'm A Fool" and "It's So Hard" did not appear on the original release of the album, but were included in subsequent releases. These tracks did not coincide with the psychedelic style of the album as they were more blues originated. Columbia Records did not re-sign the band after their contract expired, and they signed to Challenge Records.

CBS Records released The Rock Machine Turns You On, the first budget sampler LP, in the UK in 1968. The song "Turn on a Friend" was included as the sixth track on the sampler and introduced PBC to a much wider audience.

On February 8, 2000, The Great Conspiracy was released in a double album along with the group's first album on the Collectables label. It included the tracks "I'm A Fool", "It's So Hard" and the previously unreleased track, "Peter Pan". The "Peter Pan" track was recorded in one take during sessions for The Great Conspiracy, but subsequently was not released until the 2000 double album release.

== Track listing ==
Tracks 1, 4, 5, 8, and 10 are written by Alan Brackett. John Merrill wrote the rest which were tracks 2, 3, 6, 7, 9 and 11.

Side One
No.	Title	Length
1.	"Turn on a Friend (To the Good Life)"	2:21
2.	"Lonely Leaf"	3:53
3.	"Pleasure"	3:26
4.	"Too Many Do"	6:34
5.	"Living, Loving Life"	3:20
6.	"Invasion of the Poppy People"	0:40

Side Two
No.	Title	Length
7.	"Captain Sandwich"	2:10
8.	"Living Dream"	4:20
9.	"Ecstacy"	6:19
10.	"Time Is After You"	3:04
11.	"Wonderment"	4:12

== Personnel ==
=== The Peanut Butter Conspiracy ===
- Barbara "Sandi" Robison – vocals
- Alan Brackett – bass guitar, vocals
- John Merrill – guitar, vocals
- Bill Wolff – lead guitar
- Jim Voigt – drums

=== Technical ===
- Gary Usher – producer
- Roy Halee – engineer
- Tom May – engineer
- Richard Mantel – cover design
- Sherill Lewis – photography
- Billy James – liner notes
