= Mulchmen =

The Mulchmen were an instrumental surf rock band based in Dayton, Ohio, during the late 1990s. Their style combined the surf guitar influence of Dick Dale or Link Wray, early British punk, and the use of a theremin. They have opened for bands such as Dick Dale, Man or Astro-man?, Los Straitjackets, and The Breeders.

After the band dissolved, guitarist Nick Kizirnis joined Eyesinweasel, a side project of Tobin Sprout. He recorded a solo album entitled "Into the Loud" and a rockabilly album called "Go Crazy Pop!" on ATOM Records.

== Members ==
- Brian Bagdonus - bass (1995)
- Brian Hogarth - bass
- Nick Kizirnis - guitar, theremin
- Gregg Spence - drums

== Discography ==
- All The News That's Fit To Surf (7-inch EP - 1996, Luna)
- Louder Than Dirt, Thicker Than Mud! (CD - 1997, Big Beef)
- Covered With Mulch (Cassette - 1998, Big Beef)
- Greetings from Planet Stupider (CD - 1998, Big Beef)
