= Cat Mother & the All Night Newsboys =

American rock band (1967–1977)

Cat Mother and the All Night Newsboys
- Origin: New York, later Mendocino, California
- Genres: Rock; country rock
- Years active: 1967–1977
- Label: Polydor
- Past members: Roy Michaels; Bob Smith; Michael Equine; William David Chin; Larry Packer; Jay Ungar; Paul Johnson; Charlie Prichard; Steve Davidson; Charlie Harcourt; RJ "Beans" Bellanca

Cat Mother and the All Night Newsboys was an American musical group originally formed in New York and later based in Mendocino, California, most active in the late 1960s and early 1970s.

== History ==
Cat Mother and The All Night Newsboys was co-founded by Roy Michaels (February 25, 1942 – September 23, 2008) and Bob Smith (July 7, 1942 – March 21, 1991) in late 1967. Michaels had previously been playing with Stephen Stills and Richie Furay in the Au Go Go Singers, prior to the formation of Buffalo Springfield. Initial members were Bob Smith on vocals, keyboards and drums, Roy Michaels on vocals and bass guitar, William David "Charlie" Chin on vocals and guitar, Larry Packer on guitar and violin, and Michael Equine on drums and guitar. Jay Ungar was also initially associated with the group, on violin, and rejoined the group for their second album. Core band membership consisted of Michaels, Smith and Equine.

The ensemble's popularity in New York grew during 1967 and 1968, through regular appearances at the Cafe Wha?, which led to an engagement as the house band at New York's Electric Circus.

The band was particularly notable for its rock and roll medley "Good Old Rock 'n' Roll", a Top 40 hit in the summer of 1969, reaching No. 13 in Canada, No. 21 on the U.S. Billboard Pop Chart, and which also ranked Number 35 in the "Top 50 Songs from the Summer of 1969", just behind The Youngbloods' "Get Together" (No. 34) and ahead of Bob Dylan's "Lay Lady Lay" (No. 41) and The Plastic Ono Band's "Give Peace a Chance" (No. 43). Number 1 on this list, reflecting an era before stricter radio formatting, was Zager and Evans' "In the Year 2525". "Good Old Rock 'n' Roll" included cover versions of "Sweet Little Sixteen" by Chuck Berry, "Long Tall Sally" by Little Richard, "Chantilly Lace" by The Big Bopper, "Whole Lotta Shakin' Goin' On" by Jerry Lee Lewis, "Blue Suede Shoes" by Carl Perkins and "Party Doll" by Buddy Knox. "Good Old Rock 'n' Roll" was covered by the Dave Clark Five later in 1969. A second single "Can You Dance To It" reached No. 78 in Canada later in 1969.

The single and the band's debut album, The Street Giveth and the Street Taketh Away, were produced by Jimi Hendrix. The association with Hendrix came through the band meeting him in New York City. Cat Mother was initially managed by Michael Jeffery, who also managed Hendrix. Cat Mother opened for Hendrix on several occasions, as a result. Other notable early appearances included playing at the Toronto Rock and Roll Revival, the historic concert headlined by The Doors, where John Lennon and The Plastic Ono Band appeared in a surprise performance.

Other popular songs by the band included "Track in A" and "Strike a Match and Light Another." However, the band's principal chart success remained "Good Old Rock 'n' Roll", a work not representative of the diversity of its sound but rather the group's ability in original, late 50s rock style. Similar to contemporaries Moby Grape, Poco and the post-1967 Byrds, as well as predating the Eagles, Cat Mother was one of the first rock bands to blend rock and country music.

As part of the band's actions to sever ties with manager Michael Jeffery, the group relocated to San Francisco in 1970, and later settled in the Mendocino area. By the time of their 1970 second album, Albion Doo-Wah, they were joined by Jay Ungar (violin, mandolin, guitar, & vocals), Paul Johnson (guitar), and special guest Lyndon Lee Hardy (vocals on two songs). The third album, Cat Mother, released in 1972, featured Michaels, Smith and Equine joined by Charlie Prichard (lead & slide guitar) and Steve Davidson (congas & percussion). By the time of the band's final album, Last Chance Dance, in 1973, Charlie Prichard had been replaced by Charlie Harcourt on guitar, harmonica and vocals. The band continued to perform until 1977.

Michaels, Smith Packer, Chin, Ungar, Johnson, Prichard, Davidson and Harcourt all continued in music. (As of November 2020, Michael Equine is alive and the last remaining corporate officer of the band.)

The Street Giveth ... and the Street Taketh Away and Albion Doo-Wah are available through streaming services and as a digital downloads.

== Discography ==
- 1969 The Street Giveth... and the Street Taketh Away (Polydor) (No. 55 US, No. 24 Canada)
- 1970 Albion Doo-Wah (Polydor) (No. 73 Canada)
- 1972 Cat Mother (Polydor)
- 1973 Last Chance Dance (Polydor)
