= Eddie & the Showmen =

American surf rock band

Eddie & the Showmen were an American surf rock band of the 1960s. Formed in Palos Verdes, California by Eddie Bertrand, formerly of The Bel-Airs, they released several singles on Liberty Records. Their highest-charting single in Los Angeles was "Mr. Rebel", which reached number four on the Wallichs Music City Hit List on February 10, 1964.

The band originally formed because Bertrand wanted to move on from the Bel-Airs. While the Bel-Airs focused more on guitar interplay, and a moderate sound, Eddie & the Showmen played more in the style of Dick Dale with a prominent lead guitar and heavy sound. The band's original drummer was former Mouseketeer Dick Dodd, who later joined The Standells. One of the guitar players, Larry Carlton, later became a famous jazz guitarist, and another was Rob Edwards of Colours who was the guitarist on the title track for the surf movie, Pacific Vibrations.

One of Eddie & the Showmen's biggest hits, "Squad Car", was written by Paul Johnson of the Bel-Airs. Eddie and the Showmen are included in the Hard Rock Cafe: Surf 1998 compilation of surf bands and surf music on track 11. Mr. Rebel. They are also included in The Birth of Surf compilation track 20 Squad Car and are on 10 tracks of Toes on the Nose: 32 Surf Age Instrumentals compilation.

Eddie Bertrand died of cancer in November 2012.

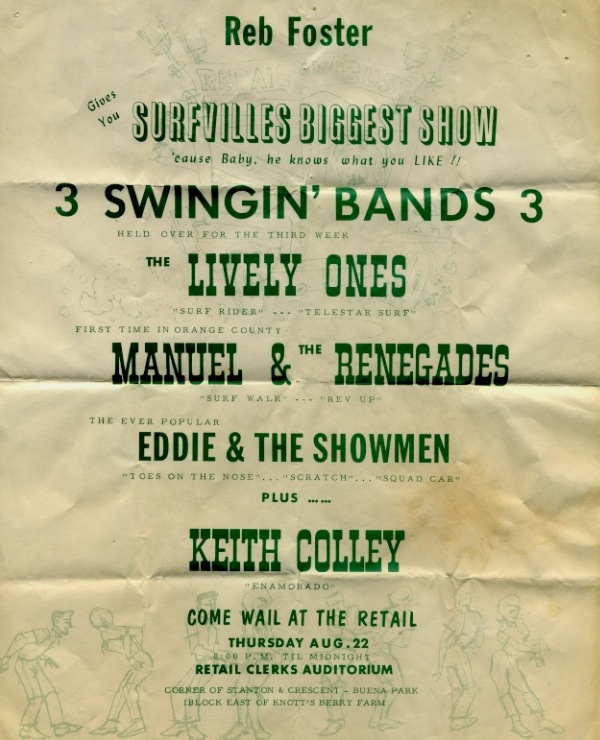
1963 Performance Flyer

== Singles ==
- "Toes on the Nose" b/w "Border Town" (Liberty 55566, 1963)
- "Squad Car" b/w "Scratch" (Liberty 55608, 1963)
- "Mr. Rebel" b/w "Movin'" (Liberty 55659, 1963)
- "Lanky Bones" b/w "Far Away Places" (Liberty 55695, 1964)
- "We Are the Young" b/w "Young and Lonely" (Liberty 55720, 1964)

== Albums ==
- Squad Car (complete singles collection plus 7 bonus tracks) (AVI Records CD-5021/EMI-Capitol Special Markets 72438-18886-29, 1996)

== Personnel ==
- Eddie Bertrand - Composer, Executive Producer, Guitar Producer
- Rob Edwards - Guitar (Rhythm)
- Brett Brady - Guitar (Rhythm)
- Larry Carlton - Guitar (Rhythm)
- John Anderson - Guitar (Rhythm)
- Freddy Buxton - Bass
- Doug Henson - Bass
- Dick Dodd - Drums
- Michael Mills - Drums
- Bobby Knight - Saxophone
- Sterling Storm - Saxophone
- Phillip Pruden - Saxophone
- Nokie Edwards - Composer
- R. Dodd - Composer
- Lee Hazlewood - Composer
- Paul Johnson - Composer
- Andreas Kramer - Composer
- Joan Whitney - Composer
- Tom Mouton - Mastering, Mixing
- Greg Vaughn - Mastering, Mixing
- Pete Ciccone - Art Direction, Design
- Patti Drosins - Executive Producer
- Bones Howe - Producer
- Drew Jessel - Assistant Producer
- Lanky Linstrot - Producer
- Dave Pell - Producer
- Stephanie Press - Assistant Producer
- Domenic Priore - Compilation Producer, Liner Notes
- Rob Santos - Compilation Producer
- Jim York - Producer
