= The Bel-Airs =

The Belairs
- Origin: Los Angeles County, California, United States
- Genres: surf music
- Years active: 1961–1965 (1986 reunion)
- Label: Arvee

The Bel-Airs were an early and influential surf music band from South Bay, Los Angeles, active in the early 1960s.

They were best known for their 1961 hit "Mr. Moto", an instrumental surf tune that featured a flamenco-inspired intro and contained a melodic piano interlude. The song's theme was used in the solo for the song "Seed" by Sublime.

Upon splitting up, guitarist Eddie Bertrand formed Eddie & the Showmen in 1964, while guitarist Paul Johnson later joined Cat Mother & the All Night Newsboys in 1970. Original Bel-Airs drummer Dick Dodd joined Bertrand in Eddie & the Showmen, and later joined the Standells, playing drums and singing lead on their major 1966 hit, "Dirty Water". Richard Delvy replaced Dick Dodd on drums, Randy Nauert replaced Steve Lotto on bass, and Art Fisher replaced Eddie Bertrand on guitar. Delvy, Fisher Nauert and Roberts went on to found the surf group The Challengers.

Johnson has continued in music, both in recording and as a performer. Among other music associations, he has been a member of the "Jim Fuller version" of the Surfaris since 1990. Bertrand also continued in music, touring as Eddie and the Soundwaves, among other performance configurations. Dodd has participated in various reunions and later recordings of the Standells.

Eddie Bertrand died of cancer on October 27, 2012, at age 67.

Dick Dodd died of cancer on November 29, 2013, at age 68.

== Band members ==
- Eddie Bertrand (lead guitar)
- Richard Delvy (drums), replacing Dick Dodd
- Dick Dodd (drums)
- George Dumeshousen (drums)
- Art Fisher (lead guitar), replacing Eddie Bertrand
- Paul Johnson (rhythm guitar)
- Steve Lotto (bass, vocals)
- Randy Nauert (bass guitar), replacing Steve Lotto
- Jim Roberts (piano)
- Chas Stuart (saxophone)
- Gerald "MeatBall" "Duke" Chauppetta (Vocals, Guitar)

== Discography ==
- "Mr. Moto" b/w "Little Brown Jug" (Arvee A-5034, 1961)
- "Volcanic Action" b/w "Runaway" (Arvee A-5054, 1962)
- "Kami-Kaze" b/w "Vampire" (Triumph TRI-54, 1963) (also included in Surfbeat by The Challengers)
- "Charlie Chan" b/w "Baggies" (Lucky Token LT-107, 1964)
- "Liverpool" b/w "The Intruder" (Lucky Token LT-111, 1965)

CD compilations

- The Origins of Surf Music 1960-1963 (Iloki IL-1007, 1993)
- Volcanic Action! (Sundazed SC-11100, 2001)
