= Clear Light (album) =

Studio album by Clear Light
- Released: September 1967
- Recorded: April – May 1967, August 1967
- Studio: Sunset Sound Recorders Hollywood, California
- Genre: Psychedelic rock
- Length: 31:59
- Label: Elektra
- Producer: Paul A. Rothchild

Clear Light is the only studio album by the American psychedelic rock band Clear Light, released in September 1967, by Elektra Records. The album was a moderate success.

Clear Light was released in September 1967 and peaked at number 126 on the Billboard Top LP's. It combined elements of folk, rock, psychedelic, and classical music. It is an AMG music pick. While the album was not a success at the time, it was considered as creative, coherent and competent. The album featured the unique characteristic of including two leading drummers on their tracks.

== Recording ==
Recording commenced in April 1967 at Elektra Recording Studio in Los Angeles. The majority of the material was completed during these sessions, but the developments were postponed to replace Robbie Robison on guitar. Instead of a new guitarist, the band recruited keyboardist Ralph Schuckett, and, following a month of concerts, the band returned to recording in Sunset Sound Recorders Studios. The studios had just recently upgraded from a 4-track to an 8-track. A highlight of the recording sessions was the band's psychedelic interpretation of the Tom Paxton composition "Mr. Blue".

== Release and reception ==
Professional ratings
Review scores
Source	Rating
AllMusic	3.5/5 stars
The Village Voice	D−

In his 1976 review for The Village Voice, Robert Christgau gave Clear Light a low rating of "D−" to an A+ to F scale. Matthew Greenwald of AllMusic was more positive to the record, calling it a "very good slice of Los Angeles psychedelia."

== Track listing ==
Side one
No.	Title	Writer(s)	Length
1.	"Black Roses"	Wolfgang Dios, Clear Light	2:09
2.	"Sand"	Douglas Lubahn	2:38
3.	"A Child's Smile"	Clear Light, Michael Ney	1:37
4.	"Street Singer"	Greg Copeland, Steve Noonan	3:17
5.	"The Ballad of Freddie and Larry"	Cliff De Young, Ralph Schuckett	1:56
6.	"With All in Mind"	Bob Seal	2:58

Side two
No.	Title	Writer(s)	Length
1.	"Mr. Blue"	Tom Paxton	6:25
2.	"Think Again"	Clear Light, Lubahn	1:37
3.	"They Who Have Nothing"	Seal	2:34
4.	"How Many Days Have Passed"	Seal	2:24
5.	"Night Sounds Loud"	Lubahn	2:26

The CD reissue of the album includes a bonus track, "She's Ready to Be Free", which was the B-side of the group's first single.

== Personnel ==
Musicians

- Cliff De Young – vocals
- Bob Seal – guitar, vocals
- Douglas Lubahn – bass
- Ralph Schuckett – keyboards
- Dallas Taylor – drums
- Michael Ney – drums
- Robbie Robison – guru
- Lee Housekeeper – seer and overseer

Technical

- Paul A. Rothchild – production
- Bruce Botnick – engineer
- Jac Holzman – production supervisor
- Gordon Anderson – executive producer
