= Treaty of Fort Laramie =

Treaty of Fort Laramie may refer to:

- Treaty of Fort Laramie (1851)
- Treaty of Fort Laramie (1868)
