= Laramie Dean =

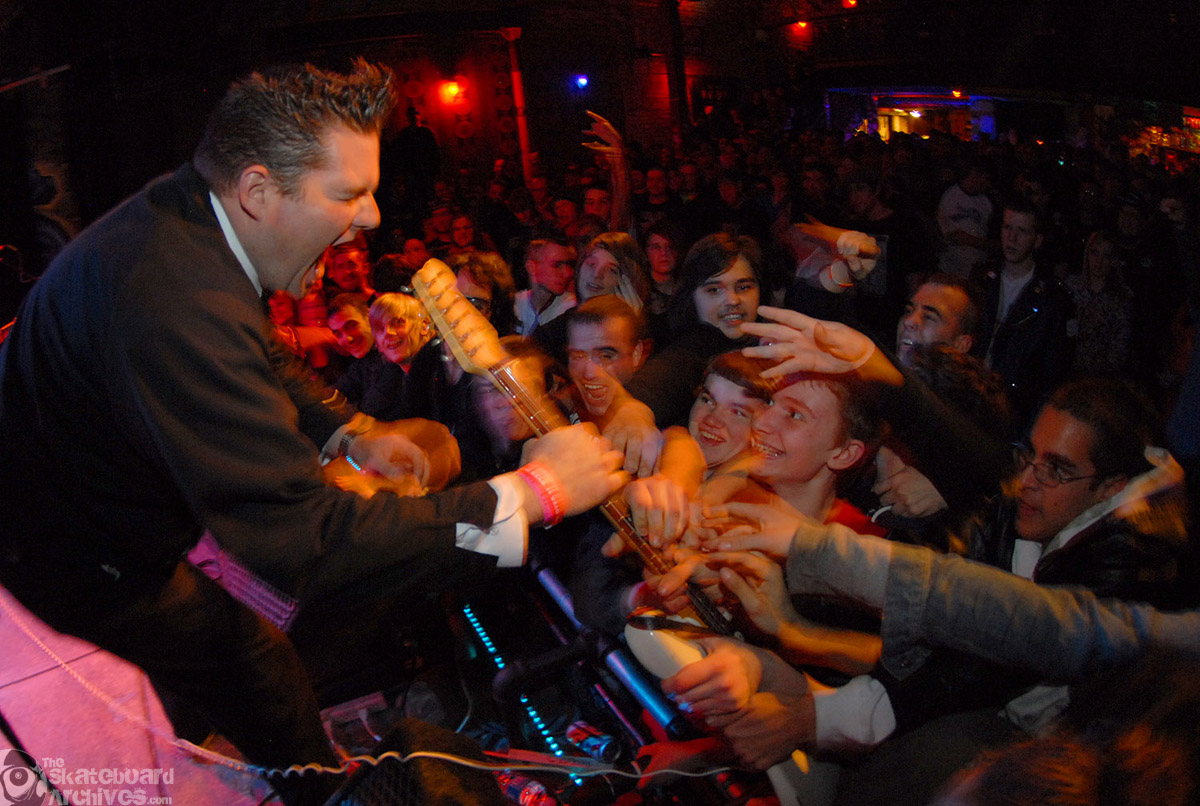
- Laramie Dean on stage

Background information
- Born: Troy, New York
- Genres: Punk rock, surf punk, surf
- Occupations: Musician, songwriter, guitarist
- Instrument: Guitar
- Years active: 1995–present
- Labels: DeFi Records, Dead End Records (DER)
- Website: laramiedean.com

Laramie Dean (born January 12, 1971) is an American guitarist.

== Biography ==
Dean was born in Troy, New York, and grew up on the Hudson River. In 1995 he moved to Portsmouth, New Hampshire.

Dean began playing at the Elvis Room, and recording with Jim Tierny, as well as Joe King a.k.a. Joe Queer of New Hampshire pop punk band The Queers. At his first show at the Elvis Room, Dean met Tamara Collins. Collins gave Dean extensive airplay on her punk rock radio show "No Rules" which aired on New Hampshire's college radio station 91.3 WUNH.

In 1999, Dean released his first 7-inch EP titled "Listen to Laramie Dean ...you can almost smell the rubber burn!" One of the songs on this EP was also featured on the "Food Not Bombs" benefit compilation for Amnesty International, which also included tracks from The Unseen, The Ducky Boys and Anti-Flag.

In June 2007, Dean recorded his only full-length LP, "Laramie Dean Plays Surf Riot!" in Miami Florida, which was released at the Misfits' 30th anniversary tour.

In January 2008, Dean relocated to Los Angeles and made his first L.A. appearance at Largo with his friend, comedian and author Greg Behrendt. Backing Dean was Behrendt's band, The Reigning Monarchs. A month later, Dean toured with Mike Palm and his band Agent Orange.

In July 2010, Dean began his first solo national headlining tour (from San Diego through Seattle and as far east as Ft. Lauderdale), joined with former Aggrolite member Korey "Kingston" Horn (drums), Jeff Bennet (saxophone) and Galaxia Records surf jazz musicians The Mattson 2 (bass/keyboards).

In September 2010, Dean completed a second US tour as a three-piece band beginning in Florida and ending in New Mexico, with "King of the Surf Guitar" Dick Dale's 18-year-old son Jimmy Dale on drums and newcomer Trevor Lucca on bass guitar.

January 2011 saw Dean completing just over 400 shows with the aforementioned Agent Orange, touring the US, Canada, Europe and the UK.

In June 2011, Laramie embarked on a rare national tour with Dick Dale himself, beginning with their first appearance together at Tucson's The Hut. Joined again by Dale's son Jimmy on drums, and Trevor Lucca on bass, Dean's act is rounded out with latest newcomer, Japanese import Hideki Ikeura on trumpet and keys.

On October 20, 2012, Dean made a last-minute appearance closing out the first day of the Arizona Taco Festival. Dean was backed by Phoenix retro-surf-instrumental band, The Amazing Coconauts, as drummer Jimmy Dale was missing following a brief run-in with the law. Los Angeles bassist, Danny Servo, performed a few songs standing in for Dean's bassist Lucca, who was also unavailable for the late-notice show.

In 2013, Dean did another US tour with Jimmy Dale, Trevor Lucca, and Alex Lewis. On this tour, Trevor Lucca's other band, Hardship Anchors were support.

On December 11, 2015, Dean screened "Surf 9 From Outer Space," a short film/extended music video at the Trepany House at the Center for Inquiry (CFI) in Los Angeles, CA.

== Critical acclaim ==
Ben Thacker of the Miami New Times wrote that "Laramie Dean, the self-proclaimed surf-punk machine, disciple of surf-guitar god Dick Dale," has a "(louder) brand of classic surf punk," stating that Dean's "virtuosity definitely kept the crowd's attention, while providing a great segue to the main act."

Flavorpill's Jason Jeffers commented that "Surf-punk star Laramie Dean['s] … ripping, growling guitar transports anyone within earshot to 1960s California" and that "Dean has amassed nationwide acclaim."

The Crossfire's Pete Craven commented that "the very dapper Laramie Dean" was "easily one of the highlights" of Agent Orange's European tour date at the legendary Camden Underworld.

Regarding Dean's tour with Dick Dale, TX Underground wrote of Dean's sound at the show of June 8 at Houston's Continental Club: "Authentic reverb heavy Surf music, but with crunchy distortion, and a Punk attitude, it makes the term 'Surf Punk' well warranted." Brian Mahar of St. Petersburg's Patch, reporting on the June 11, 2011, sold out show at the State Theater, calls Dean "a legendary surf guitar player in his own right," noting that Dean booked the entire Dick Dale-Laramie Dean tour without the help of a separate agent.

== Discography ==
=== Singles and EPs ===
- Amnesty International:Food Not Bombs Compilation/Limited Edition LP (1998) Impulse Buying Records
- Listen to Laramie Dean ... You can almost smell the rubber burn! 7-inch EP (1999) Dead End Records
- Listen to Laramie Dean ... You can almost smell the rubber burn! (Re-issue) 7-inch EP (2009) DeFi Records
- Laramie Dean is the Creeper! 7-inch Split Single (b/w: The Reigning Monarchs’ Tijuana Snakefight) (2010) DeFi Records
- Laramie Dean Plays Guitar From Outer Space EP (2015) DeFi Records

=== LP ===
- Laramie Dean plays Surf Riot! LP (2007) DeFi Records
