= Lucinda Bassett =

American writer

- Born: Lucinda Bassett; February 28, 1956 (age 70); United States
- Occupations: Author, speaker
- Known for: From Panic to Power: Proven Techniques to Calm Your Anxieties, Conquer Your Fears, and Put You in Control of Your Life
- Website: www.lucindabassett-truthbetold.com

Lucinda Bassett (born February 28, 1956) is an American self-help author and motivational speaker. Her book From Panic to Power: Proven Techniques to Calm Your Anxieties, Conquer Your Fears, and Put You in Control of Your Life is an international bestseller and has been translated into several languages.

== Career ==
Bassett developed a self-help program called "Attacking Anxiety and Depression" which was the subject of a study by the Journal of Clinical Psychology. The study of 176 participants found that roughly 50% of participants reported positive changes in their lives as a result of the program Bassett developed, which is comparable to the improvements made in private counseling with a licensed therapist.

Bassett has been a guest on talk shows such as Oprah Winfrey Show and The View. On July 17, 2016, she was featured in Prevention Magazine, alongside various celebrities such as poet Maya Angelou and Sharon Osbourne, in an article entitled "Why You Love Your Age."

Bassett founded the Midwest Center for Stress and Anxiety in 1984; she sold it in 2008 to focus on personal coaching. Her infomercial "Attacking Anxiety and Depression" is one of the longest-running infomercials in history.

In 2001, Bassett took part in a collaborative venture alongside Roberta Flack, Diana Krall, F. Murray Abraham, and Nona Hendryx, all of whom contributed a track to the meditation album "Visionary Path." Bassett narrated a track called "Mountains."

== Works ==
- From Panic to Power: Proven Techniques to Calm Your Anxieties, Conquer Your Fears, and Put You in Control of Your Life, HarperCollins, 2013 ISBN 0062117726
- The Solution : Conquer Your Fear, Control Your Future, Sterling, 2011 ISBN 1402779887
- Life Without Limits: Clarify What You Want, Redefine Your Dreams, Become the Person You Want to Be, HarperCollins, 2001 ISBN 0060956526
- Truth Be Told: A Memoir of Success, Suicide, and Survival, Sterling, 2013 ISBN 1402779879
