= Clear Light =

American psychedelic rock band

Clear Light was an American psychedelic rock band that was formed in Los Angeles, California in 1966. The group released one studio album, Clear Light. It had moderate national success before the group disbanded.

== History ==
In 1966, The Brain Train formed and was managed by Sunset Strip hipster Bud Mathis. They recorded one single – "Black Roses", written by Wolfe Dios – before changing their name to Clear Light and signing to Elektra Records. Guitarist Bob Seal felt the name should be changed to coincide with the single. Clear Light shared its name with a potent form of LSD, although Seal states the name came from his studies of Eastern philosophy. The Doors' producer Paul A. Rothchild took over management of the band.

The core members of Clear Light were:

- Bob Seal, lead guitarist and vocals
- Robbie "The Werewolf" Robison, rhythm guitar and vocals
- Doug Lubahn, bass and vocals
- Dallas Taylor, drums
- Michael Ney, on an atypical second set of drums
- Wolfgang (Wolfe) Dios, songwriter and guitar

The original line-up was featured in the 1967 motion picture The President's Analyst, with Barry McGuire cast as their leader and vocalist.

They soon added Cliff De Young on lead vocals and this is the version of the band seen on their only album cover.

However, during the recording process, often described as "brutal", Paul Rothchild was not happy with Robison's guitar skills and pressured the group to remove him. He was replaced by keyboard player Ralph Schuckett.

While performing, customers in a Park Avenue club heckled them, prompting Ralph Schuckett, to yell back at them. The band walked off the stage, retired to the Albert Hotel, and woke up in the morning to find that they had become underground "heroes".

A notable track from the Clear Light album was "Mr. Blue," a psychedelic version of a folk song written by Tom Paxton and a popular request on underground radio at the time. Lasting over six minutes, the rather sinister, psychedelic song is considered a classic of the genre. Its lyrics, which alternate between spoken word and song, include verses opening with such lines as, "Good morning, Mister Blue, we've got our eye on you," "Step softly, Mister Blue, we know what's best for you," and "Be careful, Mister Blue, this phase you're going through ...."

The album also included a reworked version of "Black Roses", released as a single, and some of guitarist Bob Seal's psychedelic folk-rock songs, namely "With All in Mind" and "They Who Have Nothing." It had some success in England, but was largely ignored in the U.S., reaching number 126 on the Billboard album chart. Paul Rothchild then pressured the other members of the band to fire Bob Seal. Seal was replaced by ex-Fug Danny "Kootch" Kortchmar; Cliff De Young was soon to follow, and after having started work on a second album the group disbanded in 1968. Two tracks from the sessions for the second album surfaced in 2006, "Darkness of Day" and "What a Difference Love Makes"; the latter showed the group moving into more commercial territory due to Kortchmar's influence.

== Aftermath ==
Cliff De Young went on to become an actor in more than 80 films and television series. Dallas Taylor, who had played previously with John Sebastian and alongside Lowell George in the pre-Little Feat group The Factory, later became a member of Crosby, Stills and Nash, Manassas and the Stephen Stills Band. He died on January 18, 2015, of complications from viral pneumonia and liver disease at the age of 66.

Ralph Schuckett went on to play on The Monkees single "Porpoise Song" and The Peanut Butter Conspiracy album For Children of All Ages. He later joined Todd Rundgren's Utopia and became a popular session player for TV soundtracks. Michael Ney also played on "Porpoise Song" and For Children of All Ages, among other session work. Doug Lubahn played bass on several of The Doors' albums, including Strange Days, Waiting for the Sun, and The Soft Parade. In addition to writing the hit "Treat Me Right", performed by Pat Benatar, he was a member of Billy Squier's band. He died on November 20, 2019, at the age of 71.

Robbie Robison ended up in Oregon. He died in 2000.

Bob Seal later gigged with Gale Garnet and the Gentle Reign, Transatlantic Railroad, and Redlegs. Danny Kortchmar worked with Carole King for a while, and then with James Taylor for many years. Seal died in 2019.

== Discography ==
=== Album ===
- Clear Light, Elektra, 1967

=== Singles ===
- "Black Roses" b/w "She’s Ready to Be Free," Elektra EK45622, 1967
- "Black Roses" b/w "She's Ready to Be Free," Elektra EKSN45019, 1967 (UK)
- "They Who Have Nothing" b/w "Ballad of Freddie and Larry," Elektra 45626, 1967
- "Night Sounds Loud" b/w "How Many Days Have Passed," Elektra EKSN45027, 1968 (UK only)
