= Ralph Kaffel =

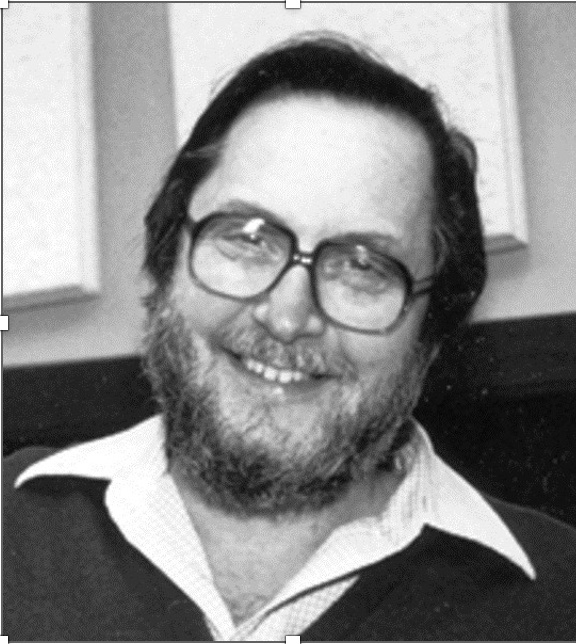
- Ralph Kaffel, president of Fantasy Records
- Born: May 10, 1932; Harbin, Manchuria
- Died: April 26, 2023 (aged 90)
- Citizenship: United States

Ralph Kaffel (10 May 1932 – 26 April 2023) was an American music executive, and rug collector.
