= Fantasy Records =

American independent record label

- Parent company: Concord (until 2026); BMG Rights Management (since 2026)
- Founded: 1949; 77 years ago
- Founder: Max Weiss; Sol Weiss
- Distributor: Universal Music Group (via Craft Recordings)
- Genre: Rock; Americana; alternative; R&B; jazz
- Country of origin: United States
- Location: Los Angeles, California
- Official website: fantasyrecordings.com

Fantasy Records is an American independent record label company founded by brothers Max and Sol Stanley Weiss in 1949. The early years of the company were dedicated to issuing recordings by jazz pianist Dave Brubeck, who was also one of its investors, but in more recent years the label has been known for its recordings of comedian Lenny Bruce, jazz pianist Vince Guaraldi, the last recordings made on the Wurlitzer organ in the San Francisco Fox Theatre before the theatre was demolished, organist Korla Pandit, the 1960s rock band Creedence Clearwater Revival, bandleader Woody Herman, and disco and R&B singer Sylvester.

== Formation ==
Logo used from 1971 to the mid-2000s

In 1949, Jack Sheedy, owner of a San Francisco-based record label called Coronet, was talked into making the first recording of an octet and a trio featuring Dave Brubeck (not to be confused with either the Australian Coronet Records or the New York City-based Coronet Records of the late 1950s). Sheedy's Coronet Records had recorded area Dixieland bands. But he was unable to pay his bills, and in 1949 he turned his masters over to a pressing company, the Circle Record Company, which was owned by Max and Sol Weiss. The Weiss brothers changed the name of their business to Fantasy Records and met an increasing demand for Brubeck's music by recording and issuing new records. The company was soon shipping 40,000 to 50,000 copies of Brubeck records per quarter.

When Brubeck signed with Fantasy, he believed he had 50 percent interest in the company. He worked as an unofficial artists and repertoire (A&R) assistant, encouraging the Weiss brothers to sign Gerry Mulligan, Chet Baker, and Red Norvo. When he discovered that all he owned was 50 percent of his own recordings, he signed with Columbia Records.

Fantasy was known for its unique colored-vinyl pressings. Monaural records were pressed in red vinyl while stereo pressings were pressed in blue. Later stereo pressings were red vinyl with a blue label. Eventually the company switched to black vinyl for all pressings and the label design went through several revisions as well.

== Acquisitions ==
In 1955, Saul Zaentz joined the company. Jazz musician Charles Mingus gave Debut Records to Zaentz as a wedding gift; at the time, Zaentz was marrying Mingus's ex-wife, Celia, who had helped found Debut with Mingus and musician Max Roach. After an unsuccessful attempt by Audio Fidelity Records to buy Fantasy, Zaentz became president in 1967. He and a group of investors bought Fantasy from the Weiss brothers that year. He then acquired Prestige Records (1971), Riverside (1972), and Milestone (1972).

Ralph Kaffel, who was vice-president of Fantasy from 1971, became president in 1973. He continued the policy of acquisitions: Stax Records (1977), Good Time Jazz (1984), Contemporary (1984), Pablo (1986), Specialty (1991), Kicking Mule (1995), and Takoma (1995).

Fantasy's first subsidiary was Galaxy Records in 1951. Years later, it started the short-lived subsidiary Scorpio, which tried to capitalize on the British Invasion. During the 1980s, it had a subsidiary named Reality Records that specialized in hip-hop music and released the first two albums by Doug E. Fresh.

== Vince Guaraldi ==
Vince Guaraldi proved a stand-out when he joined the company in 1955. His most famous contributions to Fantasy were his compositions involved in the film adaptations of the comic strip Peanuts by Charles M. Schulz. This association began with Guaraldi's album Jazz Impressions of A Boy Named Charlie Brown, which contained music he created for an unsold television documentary of the same name but became most famous with the hailed soundtrack of the classic Christmas special A Charlie Brown Christmas, the album of which itself has become a perennial Christmas best-seller. This success would lead to numerous other Peanuts compositions for the rest of Guaraldi's career, selections of which were subsequently released by Fantasy. Guaraldi departed Fantasy in 1966 after the release of Live at El Matador (a collaboration with guitarist Bola Sete).

1968 label of Creedence Clearwater Revival debut

== Creedence Clearwater Revival ==
Saul Zaentz's acquisitions had been funded in part by the success of the rock group Creedence Clearwater Revival, a group that he had managed. Creedence was signed by Fantasy Records in 1964 as the Blue Velvets, but the label renamed it the Golliwogs so it would fit in with the bands of the British Invasion. After a series of failed releases under that name on the Fantasy and Scorpio labels, the group changed its name to Creedence Clearwater Revival. In 1968, it released its first hit record, a cover version of the song "Susie Q".

In 1971, Fantasy built its headquarters at the corner of Tenth and Parker in Berkeley, California. The building was nicknamed "The House That Creedence Built".

In 2004, Fantasy was sold to a consortium led by American television writer, producer, and activist Norman Lear and merged with Concord Records to create Concord Music Group. Although some operations were still located in Berkeley, the label was later headquartered at the Concord location in Beverly Hills, California.

Shortly after Fantasy was purchased by Concord, John Fogerty, the lead singer and songwriter of Creedence Clearwater Revival, re-signed with the label after leaving it in the mid-1970s after a falling-out with Zaentz, who died in 2014.

Fantasy Studios closed in 2018 with its studios being auctioned off, in response to financial difficulties.

== Fantasy Records recording artists (current) ==
- Ry Cooder
- Devon Gilfillian
- DIIV
- Natalie Hemby
- Valerie June
- Avi Kaplan
- The Marcus King Band
- Andrew McMahon in the Wilderness
- Gov't Mule
- Lucius
- Lukas Nelson & Promise of the Real
- Grace Potter
- L.S. Dunes
- Tyler Ramsey
- Nathaniel Rateliff & The Night Sweats
- Allison Russell
- Seether
- Switchfoot
- Taking Back Sunday
- James Taylor
- Tedeschi Trucks Band
- Layla Tucker
- Tanya Tucker
- Andrea von Kampen
- Gale Force
- Odetta and Larry
