= Vault Records =

American record label (1963–1972)

Vault
- Founded: 1963
- Defunct: 1972
- Status: Defunct
- Distributor: Bell Records

Vault Records was a record label founded by Jack Lewerke and Ralph Kaffel in Los Angeles in 1963.

Vault is known for contributing to the popularity of surf rock by releasing Surfbeat, the debut album of the Challengers. ATCO Records distributed the label's recordings until 1965, when the task was taken over by Autumn Records, an independent label in San Francisco. After Autumn folded in 1966, Vault was given the catalogue. As surf rock lost popularity, Vault reissued some of its more obscure releases and signed psychedelic rock musicians. By 1969, Vault had released two nationally charting singles, and Lewerke sold the company to National Tape Distributors of Milwaukee. In 1971, he repurchased the master tapes and reissued material on JAS Records.

Along with Ralph Kaffel and Jack Lewerke, Cliff Goldsmith was also a principal in the record company.

== History ==
On 18 February 1964, Caesar and Cleo recorded "The Letter". Credited to them, the song was recorded under the direction of Richard Delvy. The arrangements were handled by Harold Battiste. With the B side "String Fever", it was released on Vault V-909. Caesar & Cleo were actually Sonny & Cher. The record was getting good attention on air. It was reported in the 7 March 1964 issue of Music Reporter, that "The Letter" by Caesar & Cleo was a "grand slam West Coast Pick". It was getting airplay on KYA and KEWB in San Francisco and KFWB, and KRLA in Los Angeles. ATCO Records who were the distributors reported that dealers were finding it hard to keep up with the orders. It was also one of the Pop Spotlights in the 14 March issue of Billboard. Referring to the single as a driver, the reviewer also said that it was unrelenting and highly danceable.

The Chambers Brothers would have five LP albums released on Vault. They had an early drummer Mike Konnic (aka Michael Konnic) before Brian Keenan who joined in 1965. According to the book that Mike Leadbitter and Neil Slaven wrote, Blues Records, A Complete Guide to 20 Years of Recorded Blues, Mike Konnic played on songs, "Yes, Yes, Yes", "Tore Up Over You", "Reconsider Baby", You've Got Me Running", and "People Get Ready" etc. They appear on the album, People Get Ready that was released on Vault SLP 9003 in 1966. The Chambers Brothers recorded their composition "Call Me" which was written by Joe and Willie of the group. It was produced by Cliff Goldsmith and released on Vault V-920. The song was performed on Hollywood a Go Go on 26 June 1965. Other albums by the group on Vault were, Now, Shout! and Feelin' the Blues. The last album the brothers had released on Vault was the 2LP, The Chambers Brothers Greatest Hits Vault SLP 135/2 in 1970.

The Caesar & Cleo single would have a new lease of life. When the Caesar & Cleo duo had a hit with "I Got You Babe" under their name Sonny & Cher, Vault re-released the old single as a Sonny & Cher record on Vault 916. This gave the label its first national chart hit. The single debuted at no. 100 on the Billboard chart on 23 October 1965 and peaked at no. 75 on 20 November.

It was reported by Record World in the magazine's 10 December 1966 issue that Bell Records' president Larry Uttal had sealed a worldwide distribution deal with Vault for the label's recordings to be released Taurus & Elkay labels with Bell as the distributor. Ralph Kaffel, Jack Lewerke and Cliff Goldsmith were pictured with Uttal in the article.

Vault was also reportedly going full-scale into the recording business. A first release for the company scheduled for 1 January. R&B artist, Theola Kilgore was the artist for that release.

Chuck Bridges and the L.A. Happening released their album on Vault SLP-132 which had a four-star rating in the 29 November 1969 issue of Billboard. They also released their single "Keep Your Faith Baby" bw "Bad Sam" on Vault V-958 which according to Billboard, was a record Vault was jumping into the soul picture with.

In 1969, Vault was sold to National Tape Distributors.

In 1971, I Stand Alone by Charles Owens' Mother Lode was released on Vault SLP 9012.

== Jazz releases ==
Vault's jazz catalogue included albums by Hampton Hawes, Charlie Barnet, and Larry Bunker with Gary Burton.
