= Surf music =

Music genre

Surf rock
- Other names: Surf music; surf pop; surf guitar
- Stylistic origins: Rock and roll; instrumental rock; surf culture; Middle Eastern; Hawaiian; Mexican; blues; doo-wop; rockabilly
- Cultural origins: Late 1950s to early 1960s, United States
- Derivative forms: Garage rock; punk rock; pop punk; garage punk; skate punk

Fusion genres
- Surf punk; indie surf

Local scenes
- California sound

Other topics
- List of surf musicians; Dick Dale; the Beach Boys

Surf rock (also known as surf pop, surf music, or surf guitar) is a genre of rock and roll associated with surf culture, particularly as found in Southern California. It was especially popular from 1958 to 1964 in two major forms. The first is instrumental surf, distinguished by reverb-heavy electric guitars played to evoke the sound of crashing waves, largely pioneered by Dick Dale and His Del-Tones. The second is vocal surf, which took elements of the original surf sound and added vocal harmonies, a movement led by the Beach Boys.

Dick Dale developed the surf sound from instrumental rock, where he added Middle Eastern and Mexican influences, a spring reverb, and rapid alternate picking characteristics. His regional hit "Let's Go Trippin'", in 1961, launched the surf music craze, inspiring many others to take up the approach.

The genre reached national exposure when it was represented by vocal groups such as the Beach Boys and Jan and Dean. Dale was quoted on such groups: "They were surfing sounds [with] surfing lyrics. In other words, the music wasn't surfing music. The words made them surfing songs. [...] That was the difference [...] the real surfing music is instrumental."

At the height of its popularity, surf music rivaled girl groups, Countrypolitan, and Motown for the top American popular music trend. It is sometimes referred to interchangeably with the "California sound". During the later stages of the surf music craze, many of its groups started to write songs about cars and girls; this was later known as "hot rod rock".

== Instrumental surf ==
=== Form ===
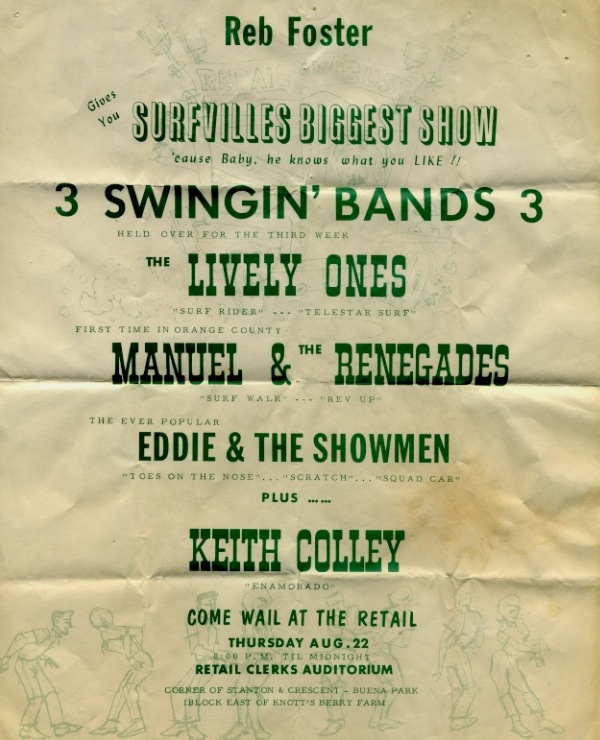
1963 performance flyer, promoting surf musicians

Surf music emerged in the late 1950s as instrumental rock and roll music, almost always in straight 4/4 (common) time, with a medium to fast tempo. The sound was dominated by electric guitars, which were particularly characterized by the extensive use of the "wet" spring reverb that was incorporated into Fender amplifiers from 1963, and was meant to emulate the sound of waves. The outboard separate Fender Reverb Unit that was developed by Fender in 1961 (as opposed to reverb that was incorporated as a built-in amp feature) was the actual first "wet" surf reverb tone. This unit is the reverb effect heard on Dick Dale records, and others such as "Pipeline" by the Chantays and "Point Panic" by the Surfaris. Compared to built-in amplifier reverb, outboard units use different circuitry to produce a wetter, more "drippy" tone.

Guitarists also made use of the vibrato arm on their guitars to bend the pitch of notes downward, electronic tremolo effects and rapid (alternating) tremolo picking. Guitar models favored included those made by Fender (particularly the Jazzmaster, Jaguar and Stratocaster), Mosrite, Teisco, or Danelectro, usually with single coil pickups (which had high treble in contrast to double-coil humbucking pickups). Surf music was one of the first genres to universally adopt the electric bass, particularly the Fender Precision Bass. Classic surf drum kits tended to be Rogers, Ludwig, Gretsch or Slingerland. Some popular songs also incorporated a tenor or baritone saxophone, as on the Lively Ones' "Surf Rider" (1963) and the Revels' "Comanche" (1961). Often an electric organ or an electric piano featured as backing harmony.

=== History ===
By the early 1960s, instrumental rock and roll had been pioneered successfully by performers such as Link Wray, Nokie Edwards and the Ventures and Duane Eddy. This trend was developed by Dick Dale, who added Middle Eastern and Mexican influences, the distinctive reverb (giving the guitar a "wet" sound); he also added blues influence in his music, and the rapid alternate picking characteristic of the genre (influenced by Arabic music, which Dale learnt from his Lebanese uncle). His performances at the Rendezvous Ballroom in Balboa, California, during the summer of 1961, and his regional hit "Let's Go Trippin'" later that year, launched the surf music craze, which he followed up with hits like "Misirlou" (1962).

While Dick Dale was crafting his new sound in Orange County, the Bel-Airs were crafting their own in the South Bay region of Los Angeles County. The band was composed of five teen-aged boys. In 1959 they were still learning to play their instruments: Dick Dodd on drums, Chas Stuart on saxophone, Jim Roberts on piano, and Eddie Bertrand and Paul Johnson on guitars. Said Johnson of his relationship with Bertrand, "Learning the guitar became a duo experience versus a solo thing. We learned to play by playing together, one guy would play the chords, the other would play the lead. This sound would become the basis for the Bel-Airs." They recorded their first single, "Mr. Moto", in June 1961 (with Richard Delvy on drums instead of Dodd) and the song received radio airplay that summer. Dale was older, played louder, commanded a larger audience, and usually gets credit for creating surf music, but the Bel-Airs lay claim to having the first surf music single.

Like Dale and his Del-Tones, most early surf bands were formed in Southern California, with Orange County in particular having a strong surf culture, and the Rendezvous Ballroom hosted many surf-styled acts. Groups such as the Bel-Airs (whose hit "Mr. Moto", influenced by Dale's earlier live performances, was released slightly before "Let's Go Trippin'"), the Challengers (with their album Surfbeat) and then Eddie & the Showmen followed Dale to regional success.

The Chantays scored a top-ten national hit with "Pipeline", reaching number four in May 1963. Probably the single-most famous surf tune hit was "Wipe Out" by the Surfaris, with its intro of a wicked laugh; the Surfaris were also known for their cutting-edge lead guitar and drum solos, and "Wipe Out" reached number two on the Hot 100 in August 1963 and number 16 in October 1966. The group also had two other global hits, "Surfer Joe" and "Point Panic".

The growing popularity of the genre led groups from other areas to try their hand. These included the Astronauts, from Boulder, Colorado; the Trashmen, from Minneapolis, Minnesota, who reached number four with "Surfin' Bird" in 1964; and the Rivieras, from South Bend, Indiana, who reached number five in 1964 with "California Sun". the Atlantics, from Sydney, Australia, were not exclusively surf musicians, but made a significant contribution to the genre, the most famous example being their hit "Bombora", in 1963. Also from Sydney were the Denvermen, whose lyrical instrumental "Surfside" reached number one in the Australian charts. Another Australian surf band who were known outside their own country's surf scene were the Joy Boys, backing band for singer Col Joye; their hit "Murphy the Surfie" from 1963 was later covered by the Surfaris.

European bands around this time generally focused more on the style played by British instrumental rock group the Shadows. A notable example of European surf instrumental is Spanish band Los Relámpagos' rendition of "Misirlou". The Dakotas, who were the British backing band for Merseybeat singer Billy J. Kramer, gained some attention as surf musicians with "Cruel Sea", in 1963, which was later covered by the Ventures, and eventually other instrumental surf bands, including the Challengers and the Revelairs.

== Vocal surf ==
=== Distinctions ===
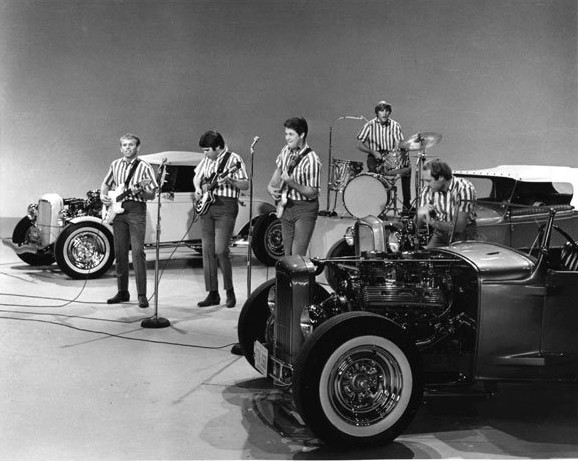
The Beach Boys performing "I Get Around" in 1964

In Matt Warshaw's The Encyclopedia of Surfing, he notes: "Surf music is divided into two categories: the pulsating, reverb-heavy, 'wet'- sounding instrumental form exemplified by guitarist Dick Dale, and the smooth-voiced, multitracked harmonized vocal style invented by the Beach Boys. Purists argue that surf music is by definition instrumental."

This second category of surf music was led by the Beach Boys, a group whose main distinction between previous surf musicians was that they projected a world view. In 1964, the group's leader and principal songwriter, Brian Wilson, explained: "It wasn't a conscious thing to build our music around surfing. We just want to be identified with the interests of young kids." A year later, he would express: "I hate so-called "surfin'" music. It's a name that people slap on any sound from California. Our music is rightfully 'the Beach Boy sound'—if one has to label it."

Vocal surf can be interpreted as a regional variant of doo-wop music, with tight harmonies on a song's chorus contrasted with scat singing. According to musicologist Timothy Cooley, "Like instrumental surf rock with its fondness for the twelve-bar blues form, the vocal version of Surf Music drew many key elements from African-American genres ... what made the Beach Boys unique was its ability to capture the nation's and indeed the world's imagination about the emerging New Surfing lifestyle now centered in Southern California, as well as the subtle songwriting style and production techniques that identify the Beach Boys' sound." In 1963, Murry Wilson, Brian's father, who also acted as the Beach Boys' manager, offered his definition of surf music: "The basis of surfing music is a rock and roll bass beat figuration, coupled with raunch-type weird-sounding lead guitar, an electric guitar, plus wailing saxes. Surfing music has to sound untrained with a certain rough flavor in order to appeal to teenagers. ... when the music gets too good, and too polished, it isn't considered the real thing."

==== Hot rod rock ====
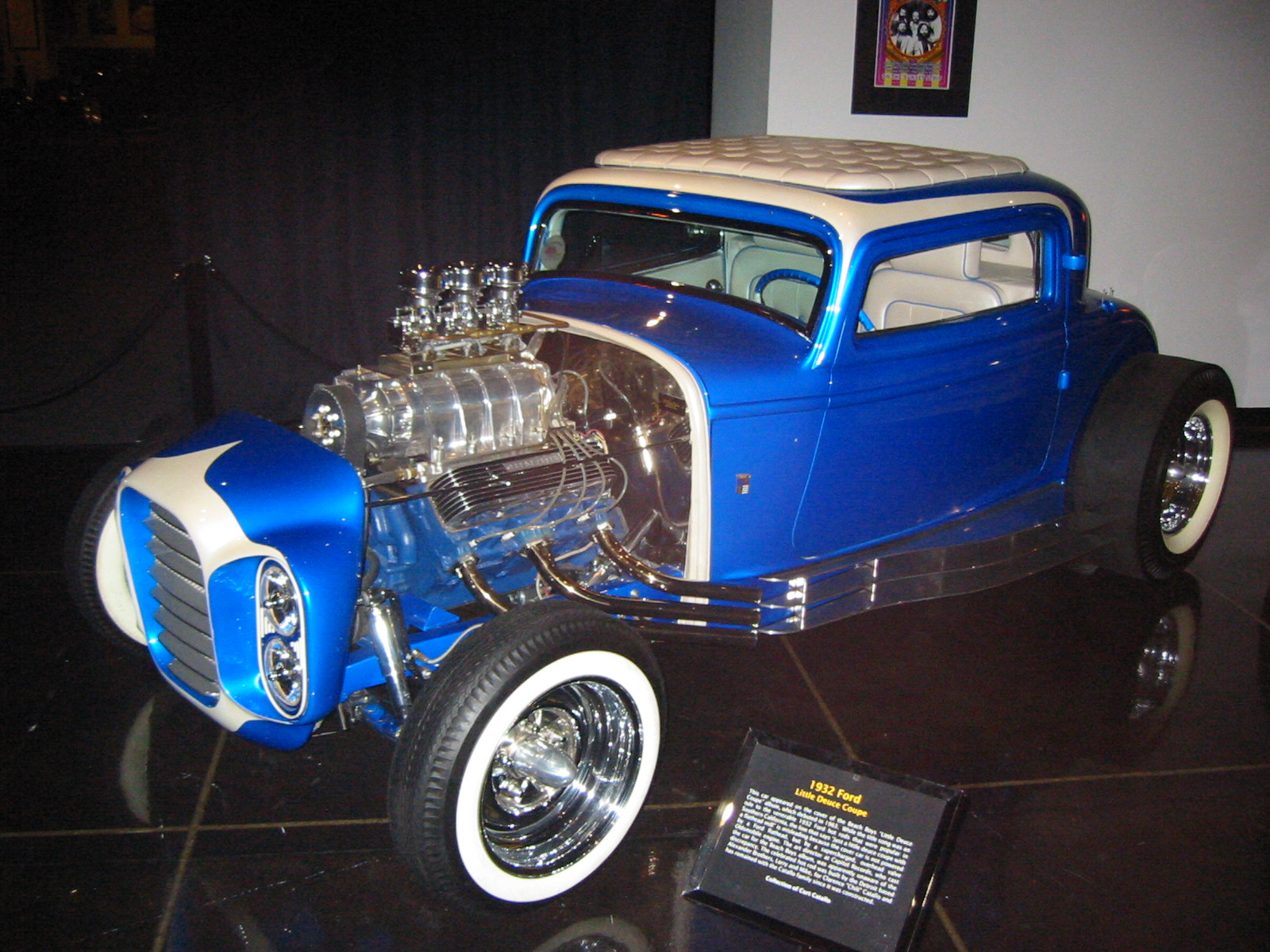
The 1932 Ford that appeared on the cover to the Beach Boys' album, Little Deuce Coupe from 1963

"Hot rod music" or "hot rod rock" evolved from surf music. Dick Dale recalled how surf music was re-imagined as hot rod music by a record company-inspired move to capture a larger market. According to The Ultimate Hot Rod Dictionary, by Jeff Breitenstein: "While cars and, to a lesser degree, hot rods have been a relatively common and enduring theme in American popular music, the term hot rod music is most often associated with the unique 'California sound' music of the early to mid-1960s ... and was defined by its rich vocal harmonies, amplified (generally Fender brand) electric guitars, and youth-oriented lyrics (most often celebrating hot rods and, more broadly, surfing and 'girls')."

Author David Ferrandino wrote that "the Beach Boys' musical treatments of both cars and surfboards are identical", whereas author Geoffrey Himes elaborated on "subtle" differences: "Translating the surf-music format into hot-rod tunes wasn't difficult. ... If surf music was a lot of Dick Dale and some Chuck Berry, hot-rod music was a little more Berry and a little less Dale—i.e. less percussive staccato and more chiming riffs. Instead of slang about waxes and boards, you used slang about carburetors and pistons; instead of name-dropping the top surfing beaches, you cited the nicknames for the top drag-racing strips; instead of warning about the dangers of a 'wipe out', you warned of 'Dead Man's Curve'."

=== Popularity ===
In late 1961 the Beach Boys had their first chart hit, "Surfin'", which peaked at number 75 on the Billboard Hot 100, In mid-1962, the group released their major-label debut, "Surfin' Safari", which hit number 14 and helped turn the surf rock craze into a national phenomenon. Next, the Beach Boys released "Surfin' U.S.A." (1963), a Top 3 hit, and "Surfer Girl" (1963), which reached the top 10. Breitenstein writes that hot rod rock gained national popularity beginning in 1962 with the Beach Boys' "409", which is often credited with initiating the hot rod music craze, which lasted until 1965. (Note: "Little Deuce Coupe". from 1963, has been cited by John Milward as one of the earliest forms of hard rock with its series of buzzing beats.) Several key figures led the hot rod movement beside Wilson, including songwriter-producer-musician Gary Usher and songwriter-disc jockey Roger Christian.

Wilson then co-wrote "Surf City" in 1963 for Jan and Dean, and it spent two weeks at the top of the Billboard top 100 chart in July 1963. In the wake of the Beach Boys' success, many singles by new surfing and hot rod groups were produced by Los Angeles groups. Himes notes: "Most of these weren't real groups; they were just a singer or two backed by the same floating pool of session musicians: often including Glen Campbell, Hal Blaine and Bruce Johnston. If a single happened to click, a group would be hastily assembled and sent out on tour. It was an odd blend of amateurism and professionalism." (Note: From 1961 to 1965, around fifteen-hundred car songs were recorded. As in the 1950s, many groups adopted the names of car brands, but with a greater emphasis on hot rods, such as the Duece Coupes, the Duals, the GTOs, the Dragsters, the Roadsters, the T-Bones, and the Roadrunners.) One-hit wonders included Bruce & Terry with "Summer Means Fun", the Rivieras with "California Sun", Ronny & the Daytonas with "G.T.O.", and the Rip Chords with "Hey Little Cobra". The latter two hits both reached the top ten, but the only other act to achieve sustained success with the formula was Jan & Dean. Hot rod group the Fantastic Baggys wrote many songs for Jan and Dean and also performed a few vocals for the duo.

== Decline ==
Like all other rock subgenres of this period, the surf music craze, along with the careers of nearly all surf acts, was effectively ended by the British Invasion beginning in early 1964. Hot rod music also ceased to be prominent that year. The emerging garage rock, folk rock, blues rock and later psychedelic rock genres also contributed to the decline of surf rock. The Beach Boys survived the invasion by diversifying their approach to music. Brian explained to Teen Beat: "We needed to grow. Up to this point we had milked every idea dry ... We had done every possible angle about surfing and then we did the car routine. But we needed to grow artistically." After the decline of surf music, the Beach Boys continued producing a number of hit singles and albums, including the sharply divergent Pet Sounds in 1966. Subsequently, they became the only American rock or pop group that could rival the Beatles. The band only sparingly returned to the hot rod and surfing-themed music, beginning with 1968's "Do It Again".

== Influence and revival ==
Instrumental surf rock style guitar was used in the James Bond Theme of the first Bond film Dr. No in 1962, recorded by Vic Flick with the John Barry Seven. The theme became a signature for Bond films and influenced the music of spy films of the 1960s. Surf music also influenced a number of later rock musicians, including Keith Moon of the Who, East Bay Ray of the Dead Kennedys, and Pixies guitarist Joey Santiago. During the mid-to late 1990s, surf rock experienced a revival with surf acts, including Dick Dale recording once more, partly due to the popularity of the movie Pulp Fiction in 1994, which used Dale's "Misirlou" and other surf rock songs in the soundtrack.

=== Surf punk ===
Surf punk is a fusion genre that merges surf rock with punk rock. Emerging in the late 1970s and early 1980s by groups and artists such as the Ramones, who released their seminal surf-punk album Rocket To Russia in 1977, featuring a prominent cover of "Surfin' Bird" by The Trashmen (a cover of which as served as The Cramps' debut single in 1978). Other early surf punk artists included Johnny Thunders, who opened his debut solo album So Alone with an instrumental cover of The Chantays' song, "Pipeline"; the Forgotten Rebels from Canada, who released "Surfin' on Heroin" in 1981; and Agent Orange, from Orange County, California, who recorded punk cover versions of surf classics such as "Misirlou", "Mr. Moto", and "Pipeline", with AllMusic's Greg Prato calling the band "influential" and "a step ahead of the rest of the punk/hardcore pack". The genre is related to skate punk, which rose to prominence at the same time in the Orange County beach towns that nurtured the first wave of surf musicians.

=== Indie surf ===
Indie surf is a fusion genre which merges surf rock and indie rock and originally emerged in California during the late 2000s, drawing influences from surf punk, garage rock, lo-fi, indie pop, punk and shoegaze.

== Production ==
Herb Alpert played a part in the genre, producing for Jan & Dean. With Lou Adler, Alpert produced Jan & Dean's first Top Ten single, "Baby Talk". Tony Hilder who owned the Impact label was a prolific surf music producer, whose status as a producer was still recognized many years later. His name as publisher, producer etc., appears on many records, both 45s and albums. If not for the poor crediting on the budget releases his name would have appeared on more. Gary Usher was a producer, arranger and writer. His work included the Surfaris and the Hondells. He also co-wrote "409" and "In My Room", which were hits for the Beach Boys. In later years, Sundazed Music would release the Barefoot Adventure: The 4 Star Sessions 1962-66 compilation album. The notes say Gary Usher was a primary architect of the sound of the early-sixties West Coast; cars, girls, sun and surf!. Terry Melcher was a producer, noted for his part in shaping the sound of surf music as well as folk. He worked closely with the Beach Boys and was responsible for some of their chart success. Outside Brian Wilson's work with the Beach Boys, one of the acts he produced was Bob & Sheri with their 1962 single, "Surfer Moon".

Los Angeles session musicians, The Wrecking Crew played on many surf music recordings.

== See also ==
- Beach music
- Spy music

== Bibliography ==
- Blair, John (1985). The Illustrated Discography of Surf Music, 1961–1965 (2nd ed.). Pierian Press.
- Blair, John (2015). Southern California Surf Music, 1960-1966. Arcadia Publishing. ISBN 978-1-4671-3320-3.
- Bogdanov, Vladimir; Woodstra, Chris; Erlewine, Stephen Thomas, eds. (2002). All Music Guide to Rock: The Definitive Guide to Rock, Pop, and Soul. Backbeat Books. ISBN 978-0-87930-653-3.
- Breitenstein, Jeff. Ultimate Hot Rod Dictionary: A-Bombs to Zoomies. MotorBooks International. ISBN 978-1-61059-235-2.
- Browne, Ray Broadus; Browne, Glenn J. (1986). Laws of Our Fathers: Popular Culture and the U.S. Constitution. Popular Press. ISBN 978-0-87972-338-5.
- Cooley, Timothy J. (2014). Surfing About Music. University of California Press. ISBN 978-0-520-95721-3.
- Cozzen, R. Duane (2015). Surf & Hot Rod Music of the 60's: Collectors Quick Reference. Lulu.com. ISBN 978-1-329-40033-7.
- DeWitt, John (2001). Cool Cars, High Art: The Rise of Kustum Kulture. Jackson: University Press of Mississippi. ISBN 9781604737752.
- Edmondson, Jacqueline, ed. (2013). Music in American Life: An Encyclopedia of the Songs, Styles, Stars, and Stories that Shaped our Culture. ABC-CLIO. ISBN 978-0-313-39348-8.
- Ferrandino, David (2015). Turner, Katherine L. (ed.). This is the Sound of Irony: Music, Politics and Popular Culture. Farnham: Ashgate Publishing. pp. 145–158. ISBN 9781472442611.
- Marcus, Ben (2013). Surfing: An Illustrated History of the Coolest Sport of All Time. MBI Publishing Company. ISBN 978-1-61058-761-7.
- Henderson, Lol; Stacey, Lee (2014). Encyclopedia of Music in the 20th Century. Routledge. ISBN 978-1-135-92946-6.
- Miller, Jim (1992). "The Beach Boys". In DeCurtis, Anthony; Henke, James; George-Warren, Holly (eds.). The Rolling Stone Illustrated History of Rock & Roll: The Definitive History of the Most Important Artists and Their Music. New York: Random House. ISBN 9780679737285.
- Nathan, David; Lindsay, Susan Gedutis, eds. (2001). Inside the Hits. Berklee Press. ISBN 978-0-634-01430-7.
- Perna, Alan di (2012). Guitar Masters: Intimate Portraits. Hal Leonard. ISBN 978-1-4803-2970-6.
- Roberts, Jim (2001). How the Fender Bass Changed the World: By Jim Roberts. Backbeat Books. ISBN 978-0-87930-630-4.
- Sabin, Roger (1999). Punk Rock, So What?: The Cultural Legacy of Punk. Routledge. ISBN 0-415-17029-X.
- Shuker, Roy (2012). Horn, David; Shepherd, John (eds.). Continuum Encyclopedia of Popular Music of the World. Vol. 8. New York; London: A & C Black. pp. 279–280. ISBN 9781441148742.
- Warshaw, Matt (2005). The Encyclopedia of Surfing. Houghton Mifflin Harcourt. ISBN 0-15-603251-1.
