= Paul Johnson (guitarist) =

- Born: Paul Arthur Johnson
- Origin: California, U.S.A.
- Genre: Surf music
- Instrument: guitar
- Years active: 1960s–present
- Website: pjmoto.com

Paul Johnson is a guitarist and songwriter, best known for his work in instrumental surf music and the track "Mr. Moto" by his band The Bel-Airs.
