= Moonalice (album) =

Album by Moonalice

Studio album by Moonalice
- Released: April 14, 2009
- Genre: Roots rock, rock, pop, blues, psychedelic rock
- Label: A Minor Label
- Producer: T Bone Burnett

Moonalice chronology
Estimated Charges (iTunes EP) (2006)	Moonalice (2009)

Professional ratings
Review scores
Source	Rating
Type 3 Media	6.5/10 stars

Moonalice is the first studio album by Moonalice, released on April 14, 2009. Four tracks were released on the band's web-site in 2007, with a fifth track being posted later. The album contains the following: a standard music CD; and an optimized audio DVD with the music in high resolution stereo 24/96 WAV, 256 KPS MP3, 256 KPS AAC, and lossless FLAC formats, as well as two music videos for songs not among the album's audio tracks, "Whiter Shade of Pale" and "Tell Me It's OK". It was released on the "A Minor Label" label. The album was produced using XOΔE (CODE), a high fidelity audio standard and optimization system created by producer Burnett. All the main band members are credited with providing bass guitar, and management, booking, legal, art/design, and photography personnel all have "(and Bass)" attached to their credits, part of an in-joke related to the band's fictitious origin story.

== Music videos ==
A music video was produced for the track "Listen to Those Eyes" produced by Jay Blakesberg.

== Track listing ==
Studio tracks from official page

1. "Bleeding of Love"
2. "Unspoken Words"
3. "I'm Glad You Think So" (R. McNamee)
4. "Blink of an Eye" (Ann McNamee, Roger McNamee)
5. "Eileen Aroon"
6. "Kick It Open" (Pete Sears, Jeannette Sears)
7. "Listen to Those Eyes" (A. McNamee)
8. "I Ain't Ever Satisfied" (Steve Earle)
9. "Dance Inside the Lightning"
10. "Dusty Streets of Cairo"
11. "This Changes Everything"

== Personnel ==
=== Moonalice ===
- G. E. Smith – guitars, vocals, bass
- Roger McNamee – guitar, vocals, bass
- Barry Sless – guitar, vocals, pedal steel guitar, bass
- Pete Sears – keyboards, vocals, accordion, bass
- Jack Casady – bass
- James Sanchez – drums, bass
- Ann McNamee – percussion, vocals, bass

=== Guest artists ===
- Jay Bellerose — drums, percussion
- T Bone Burnett — guitar
- Dave Way — bass
- Roger Love — background vocals
- Stacy Parrish — background vocals
- Children's chorus on "This Changes Everything" — Simone Burnett, Madison Love, Riley Way
