= Tony Bove =

American writer

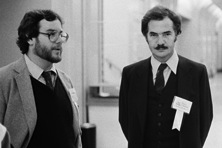
- Tony Bove (left) with Adam Osborne, 1983
- Born: 1955; Philadelphia, PA
- Died: November 14, 2025 (aged 69–70)
- Occupations: Author, publisher, musician

Tony Bove (born in 1955 in Philadelphia, Pennsylvania – died November 14, 2025) was an author, publisher, and musician. He has authored or coauthored more than two dozen computer-related books and multimedia CD-ROMs, and has served as author and editor of various magazine articles.

== Career ==
Tony Bove wrote the book The Art of Desktop Publishing (Bantam Books, 1986).

He is the cofounder, editor and publisher of Desktop Publishing Magazine, User's Guide to CP/M, and Bove and Rhodes Inside Report (with Cheryl Rhodes).

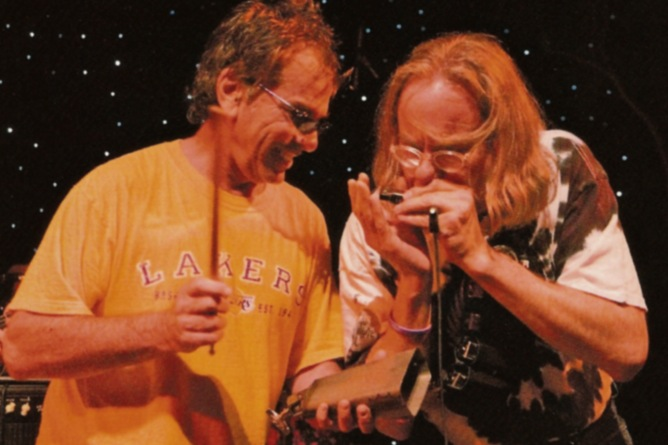
Mickey Hart of the Grateful Dead and Tony Bove (right), 2006

In 1991, Bove started doing multimedia development on personal computers. His Haight-Ashbury in the Sixties CD-ROM was produced with poet and San Francisco Oracle underground newspaper editor Allen Cohen, featuring music from the Grateful Dead, Janis Joplin, and Jefferson Airplane.

Bove wrote iPod and iTunes For Dummies and coauthored iPad Application Development For Dummies with Neal Goldstein. Bove coauthored The iLife '04 Book with Andy Ihnatko. He wrote The GarageBand Book, and The Well-Connected Macintosh with Cheryl Rhodes. He wrote Official Macromedia Director Studio and Adobe Illustrator: The Official Handbook for Designers.

Bove was the editor of Desktop Publishing Magazine, User's Guide to CP/M, Portable Companion (for Osborne Computer Corporation), and Jim Warren's DataCast, as well as a columnist in Computer Currents, Macintosh Today, NewMedia, Publish!, The WELL, The Chicago Tribune, and the Prodigy (online service), and a contributor to magazines including NeXTWorld, Dr. Dobb's Journal, and Whole Earth Software Catalog and Review.

In 2005, Bove wrote the book Just Say No to Microsoft (No Starch Press, 2005), to which John C. Dvorak added a foreword.

Tony Bove is a band member (harmonica, vocals, and songwriting) of the Flying Other Brothers rock band (which included Roger McNamee, Pete Sears, Barry Sless, and G. E. Smith).

== Discography ==
- Haight-Ashbury in the Sixties (1991)

== Bibliography ==
- The Art of Desktop Publishing (1986)
- Just Say No to Microsoft (2005)
- iPod and iTunes For Dummies
- iPad Application Development For Dummies
- The iLife '04 Book
- The GarageBand Book
- The Well-Connected Macintosh
- Official Macromedia Director Studio
- Adobe Illustrator: The Official Handbook for Designers

== Reception ==
Bove's Haight-Ashbury in the Sixties CD-ROM was previewed in Wired.

Robert Scoble reviewed Bove's book Just Say No to Microsoft, to which John C. Dvorak added a foreword.

Bove's book The Art of Desktop Publishing (Bantam Books, 1986) was reviewed by Erik Sandberg-Diment in The New York Times.
