= Stacy Parrish =

American singwriter and musician (born 1968)

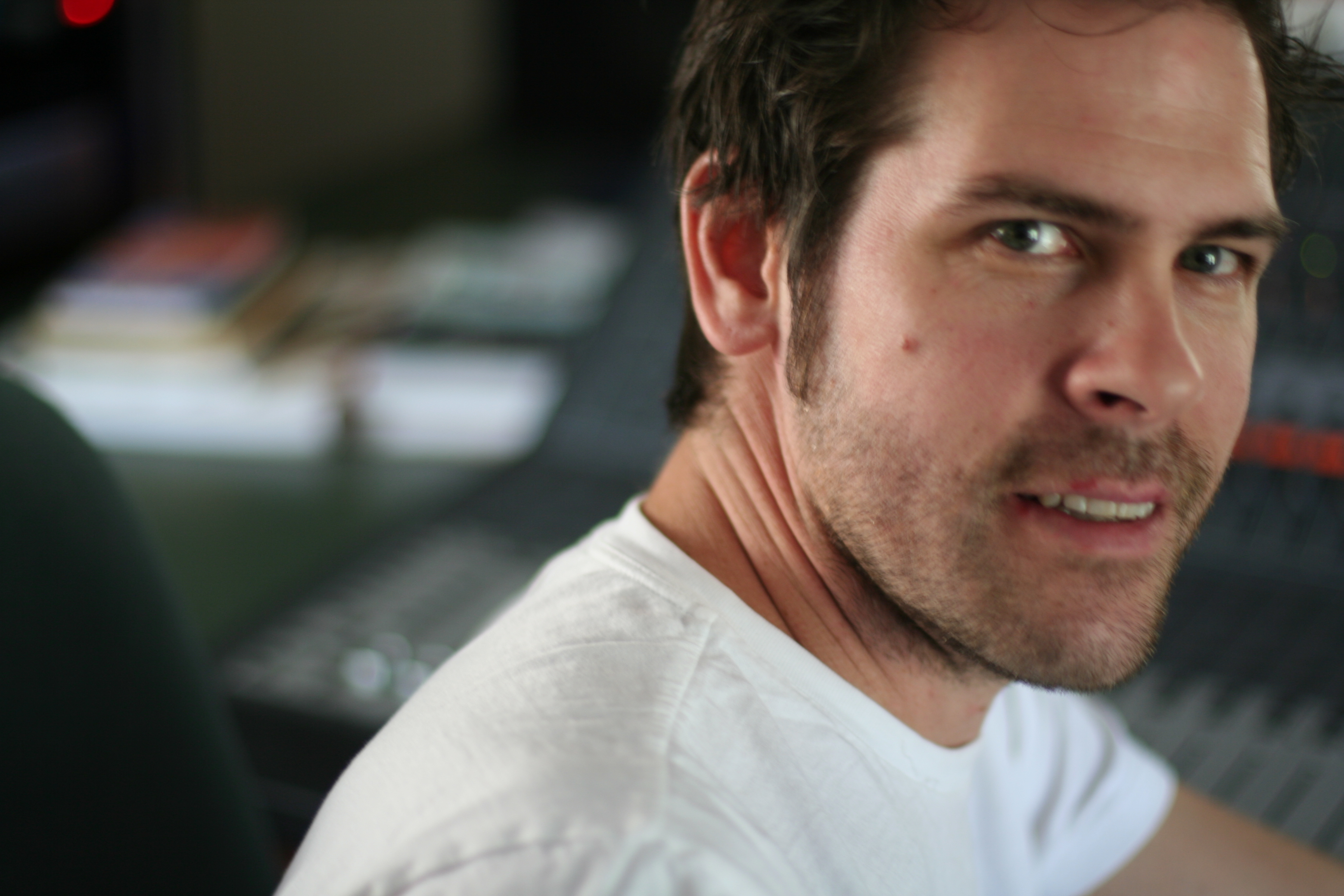
- Stacy Parrish at his studio in Albuquerque, New Mexico.

Background information
- Born: Stacy Parrish Whitehead; October 18, 1968 (age 57); St. Charles, Missouri, United States
- Years active: 1985–present

Stacy Parrish (born Stacy Parrish Whitehead, October 18, 1968, St. Charles, Missouri), and raised in Albuquerque, New Mexico, is an American songwriter, musician, engineer, and record producer.

== Biography ==
Parrish began playing piano at age 7. He started to get serious about music in 1985 when he co-founded the band Arena with high school friends Jeff Cannon and Michael Brown. They were later joined by Parrish's brother, Shannon Whitehead, in 1986. Arena changed their name to Virtu in 1987 just before meeting producer and engineer Billy Stull at Norman Petty Recording Studios in Clovis, New Mexico. Virtu became The Rudiments in 1989 with the addition of Peter Weldon and Steve Crider on guitars.

In 1992, Parrish (vocals/guitar) joined Robbie Dunn (guitar), Steve Chavez (bass) and Chuck Martin (drums) to form January's Little Joke. By the time January's Little Joke wrote and recorded their first self-titled album, Parrish had already established his own recording studio, Water Studios, in Albuquerque, New Mexico. In addition to providing professional recording space for January's Little Joke, Water Studios had soon become a popular studio for a growing local music scene in Albuquerque. Musicians such as Venus Diablo, Eric McFadden, Alien Lovestock, Naomi, Wagogo, Stoic Frame, Jenny Clinkscales Band, Vibraluxe Blues Band and Strawberry Zots recorded there.

Today, Parrish writes and performs with a band called simple., whose line up is Parrish (vocals/guitar), Joe Anderson (bass), Daniel Prevett (guitar), and Jeff "J-Ro" Romaniuk (drums).

In 1998, Shaunna Hall (4 Non Blondes) contacted Parrish to engineer an album for a San Francisco band called the Flying Other Brothers - who later became Moonalice.

Parrish met Jack Casady in San Francisco in 2000. Casady was brought in to work on the Flying Other Brothers' album San Francisco Sounds which Parrish was producing. Cassdy asked Parrish to engineer and mix Casady's first solo album, Dream Factor. Parrish co-wrote the song 'Daddies Little Girl' on that record, sung by Ivan Neville. In 2001, Parrish recorded several tracks for another Flying Other Brothers record called 52 Week High at Abbey Road Studios in London.

In 2004 T-Bone Burnett hired Parrish to record his The True False Identity tour. Soon after Burnett asked Parrish to be his front of house engineer, as well as work with Burnett on his countless studio projects. In 2008, Parrish was awarded a TEC award (Technical Excellence and Creativity) and a Grammy certificate for his work on the Robert Plant/Alison Krauss record Raising Sand. The song "Gone, Gone, Gone (Done Moved On)" won Best Pop Collaboration with Vocals at the 50th Grammy Awards. The album garnered five more Grammy's including Album of the Year at the 51st Grammy Awards in 2009. Parrish received five more Grammy certificates for his contributions.

Parrish's other notable recording, mixing and engineering achievements include: The Story by Brandi Carlile, Moonalice, Mixing Front of House and live sound recordings for Randy Newman, Jon Brion, GE Smith, Hot Tuna, The Coward Brothers with Elvis Costello and T-Bone Burnett; Neko Case live with T-Bone Burnett, John Cougar Mellencamp, and Doyle Bramhall II.

His feature film credits include: Across the Universe (recording/mixing engineer for The Beatles music); Fred Clause (recorded the Christmas music including the children's choir);and After the Flood (as music supervisor/producer). His independent film credits include: Rebuilt (score); In Victor's Profession (score, sound design); My First Tooth (score, editor); Someone's Watching (sound design); Checkmate (editor, score, sound design); Overcoming Andrew (sound design, score); and Elotero (score, sound design); "Bill And Julia" (editor, sound design, score).

His television and documentary credits include: Dog the Bounty Hunter season 4; Parking Wars season 2; and Music Makes a Better Person (sound recording engineer, music producer/supervisor). In 2011 Parrish worked with Strix Television as an audio engineer creating the 14th season of the Danish television show "Robinson Expedition", a.k.a. "Survivor".

As of 2021, Parrish has taken a slight turn in his career as he now works in London, United Kingdom in the famous BRIT School for Performing Arts where he teaches sound engineering, recording and production arts to Year 12 and 13s.
