= Minnesota (disambiguation) =

Minnesota is a state in the United States.

Minnesota may also refer to:

== Places ==
- Minnesota River, a tributary of the Mississippi River
- University of Minnesota
  - Minnesota Golden Gophers, the athletic program of the University of Minnesota
- Minnesota City, Minnesota, in Winona County
- Minnesota Point, a cape in Duluth

== Music ==
- Minnesota (band), a German Eurodance band
- "Minnesota" (song), by Lil Yachty

== Sports ==
- Minnesota Timberwolves, NBA team
- Minnesota Twins, MLB team
- Minnesota Vikings, NFL team
- Minnesota United FC, MLS team
- Minnesota Wild, NHL team

== Ships ==
- SS Minnesota (1903)
- SS Minnesota (1927), an ocean liner
- USS Minnesota (various)

== See also ==
- Minnesota Junction, Wisconsin, an unincorporated community
