= Ann McNamee =

American singer-songwriter

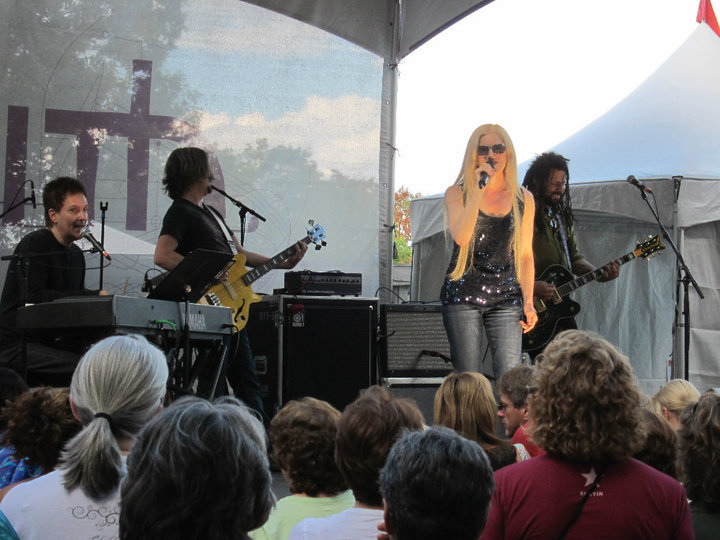
- Ann McNamee performing with her band Ann Atomic at Lilith Fair, Comcast Center, Great Woods, Mansfield, MA on July 30, 2010.

Background information
- Born: Ann Kosakowski; May 21, 1953 (age 73); Southbridge, Massachusetts, United States
- Genres: Indie rock, indie pop, alternative rock
- Occupations: Singer-songwriter, professor emerita (swarthmore college)
- Instruments: Voice, piano, keyboards, hand percussion, bass
- Website: annmcnamee.com
- Scientific career
- Thesis: Karol Szymanowski's mazurkas: cyclic structure and harmonic language (1980)
- Doctoral advisor: Allen Forte

Ann Kosakowski McNamee (born May 21, 1953) is a music theorist, singer-songwriter and musical theater composer/lyricist based in San Francisco, California and a retired Professor Emerita of music at Swarthmore College notable for her contribution to music theory; her song writing; and her musical performances with the bands the Flying Other Brothers and Moonalice known for their cutting-edge technology, particularly in the area of social media, as well as their performances at festivals such as Hardly Strictly Bluegrass, Nateva, Summer Camp Music Festival, Oregon Country Fair, Gathering of the Vibes; and with her band Ann Atomic during the 2010 revival of Lilith Fair. She composed the majority of the songs on the Moonalice album that was part of T Bone Burnett’s nomination for Producer of the Year at the 2009 Grammys.

== Contribution to music theory ==
She is the author of highly cited academic work in music theory, specifically on bitonality, mode and interval in the music of Karol Szymanowski, the role of the piano introduction in Franz Schubert's Lieder, and the octave expansion and sonata form of Grażyna Bacewicz's Second Piano Sonata.

She has been cited by Allen Forte, co-winner of the 1997 Wallace Berry Distinguished Book Award of the Society for Music Theory for her significant contribution to his 1995 book, "The American Popular Ballad of the Golden Era, 1924–1950: A Study in Musical Design.". Dave Headlam, winner of the 1997 Deems Taylor award in the Symphonic Books category of the American Society of Composers, Authors, and Publishers (ASCAP), cited her for her contribution on interval cycles in Karol Szymanowski's works, in his 1996 book "The Music of Alban Berg". Kristine H. Burns in her 2002 book, "Women and Music in America Since 1900: An Encyclopedia [Two Volumes]" cited her for her work on the music of Franz Schubert and Karol Szymanowski. She has also been cited in reviews of music in the 2004 edition of "New Historical Anthology of Music by Women" edited by James R. Briscoe.

== Contribution to music's digital revolution ==
McNamee is the co-writer of the Moonalice song "It's 4:20 Somewhere". The lyrics of the song were referenced in the 2011 book, "The Fall of the House of Forbes: The Inside Story of the Collapse of a Media Empire" by Stewart Pinkerton. In August 2012 the Rock and Roll Hall of Fame announced that the digital logs for "It's 4:20 Somewhere" had been acquired for its library and archives, describing the Moonalice logs as helping to "...tell the story of music's digital revolution; specifically the rise of direct-from-artist (DFA) distribution. Moonalice is the first band without a label to achieve one million downloads of a song from its own servers, direct-from-artist. "It's 4:20 Somewhere" has been downloaded over 4.6 million times".

== Contribution to musical theater ==
Having retired from performing with Moonalice in October 2012 to pursue a career in musical theater, she co-wrote a musical, Love Bytes, together with Roger Love. Six of the songs from Love Bytes were performed during a public performance in October 2012. She is collaborating on a second musical, Other World, with Hunter Bell, Jeff Bowen and Wētā Workshop (Wellington, NZ), initially developing the project as part of the Johnny Mercer Writers Colony at Goodspeed Musicals in 2014. Other World was selected as the inaugural project at the 2016 Spring Space in Saratoga Springs, New York, and held its First Preview at Bucks County Playhouse on March 14, 2020. A preview of Other World was streamed as a part of the New York Theatre Barn's New Works Series on June 23, 2021. Other World began its world-premiere engagement February 24, 2022 at Delaware Theatre Company co-starring Bonnie Milligan, with performances through March 20, 2022. The production won best New Play or Musical at the Broadway World awards for Delaware 2022. Invitation-only staged readings to Other World were held on Thursday, March 16 and Friday, March 17, 2023, at Open Jar Studios in New York City. It was announced at the New York Comic Con in November 2023 that Other World has also been released as a comic book series. An exhibition entitled ‘Stage to Page’ took place at the Haight Street Art Center in May, 2024. The Delaware Theatre Company announced performances of Other World as a part of the 2026 - 2027 season from 17 February to 7 March, 2027.

== Personal ==
She has a B.A. in music from Wellesley (1975) and a PhD in Music Theory from Yale University (1980). She has been married to the venture capitalist Roger McNamee since 1983 and, with her husband, is a co-founder of the Haight Street Art Center, which will be run as a co-op for artists, and will include a fine art print shop as well as exhibition space.

Along with Jack Markell, former Governor of Delaware, created “Charlottesville,” a song celebrating the life of Heather Heyer, and “The Silence of the Good,” featuring Dr. Clarence B. Jones, which includes the lyric, “As history has taught us, the Reverend understood, the bad get their power from the silence of the good.” This song is inspired by Dr. Martin Luther King Jr.'s The Letter from Birmingham Jail, where the civil rights leader was detained after a rally in 1963.

== Haight Street Art Center ==
Together with her husband Roger McNamee, she co-founded the Haight Street Art Center (HSAC), a San Francisco non-profit dedicated to poster and graphic art, printmaking education and free public exhibitions. The center opened on 1 July 2017 at 215 Haight Street in a historic former San Francisco State Teachers' College /University of California Berkeley Extension building that retains a 1937 Works Progress Administration/WPA fresco by Reuben Kadish.

Ann McNamee has served as founder, treasurer and board director; Roger McNamee has served as board/chair/president.

== Discography ==
- 2012 Let's Start from Here
- 2012 No End to Love
- 2011 The Rest of the Words
- 2011 It's 4–20 Somewhere
- 2010 Wherever These Words Land
- 2008 Blink of An Eye Produced by T-Bone Burnett
- 2007 Cracks in the Sidewalk Produced by G.E. Smith
- 2005 Complicated Eyes Produced by G.E. Smith
- 2003 Crazy in Heaven Produced by G.E. Smith
- 2000 Space in Your Arms
