= Bigger, Better, Faster, More! =

- Original album artwork by Mark Ryden

Studio album by 4 Non Blondes
- Released: October 13, 1992
- Recorded: 1992
- Studios: Groove Masters, Santa Monica, California: Record Plant, Sausalito, California
- Genres: Alternative rock; hard rock
- Length: 41:02
- Labels: Interscope; Atlantic
- Producer: David Tickle

4 Non Blondes chronology
Bigger, Better, Faster, More! (1992)	Hello Mr. President (Live in Italy 1993) (1994)

Singles from Bigger, Better, Faster, More!
- 1. "Dear Mr. President" Released: 1992; 2. "What's Up?" Released: March 11, 1993; 3. "Spaceman" Released: September 1993

Professional ratings
Review scores
Source	Rating
AllMusic	3/5 stars
Robert Christgau	C
Entertainment Weekly	A−
Music Week	3/5 stars
NME	3/10
Q	4/5 stars

Bigger, Better, Faster, More! is the debut studio album by American rock band 4 Non Blondes, released on October 13, 1992. The first single was "Dear Mr. President", which bass player Christa Hillhouse told Songfacts "was about the hierarchy of power and government." The second single, "What's Up?", reached No. 1 in several countries and went gold in the United States, while the album itself went platinum, accumulating sales of 1.5 million copies in the United States alone and 6 million copies worldwide.

== Track listing ==
No.	Title	Writer(s)	Length
1.	"Train"	Linda Perry	3:42
2.	"Superfly"	Perry · Katrina Sirdofsky	4:37
3.	"What's Up?"	Perry	4:55
4.	"Pleasantly Blue"	Perry	2:28
5.	"Morphine & Chocolate"	Shaunna Hall	4:44
6.	"Spaceman"	Hall · Perry	3:40
7.	"Old Mr. Heffer"	Wanda Day · Hall · Christa Hillhouse · Perry	2:16
8.	"Calling All the People"	Day · Hall · Hillhouse · Perry · Dawn Richardson	3:17
9.	"Dear Mr. President"	Perry	4:43
10.	"Drifting"	Perry	3:31
11.	"No Place Like Home"	Day · Hall · Hillhouse · Perry	3:08
Total length:			41:02

== Personnel ==
4 Non Blondes

- Linda Perry – lead vocals, acoustic guitar
- Christa Hillhouse – bass, background vocals
- Roger Rocha – lead guitar (credited but joined after the album's completion)
- Dawn Richardson – drums

Additional musicians

- Shaunna Hall – guitar
- Rory Kaplan – Mellotron
- Suzie Katayama – cello, accordion
- Louis Metoyer – guitar
- Dave Rickets – keyboard
- Andy James – drums
- Laurent Tardy – piano

Technical personnel

- David Tickle – producer
- Paul Dieter – audio engineer/engineer
- Mark Hensley – engineer
- Jesse Kanner – engineer
- Kent Matcke – engineer
- Laurent Tardy – engineer
- David Tickle – mixing
- Stephen Marcussen – mastering
- Leslie Gerard-Smith – project coordinator
- Eric Altenburger – design
- Mark Ryden – cover illustration

== Charts ==
=== Weekly charts ===
Weekly chart performance for Bigger, Better, Faster, More!
Chart (1992–1993)	Peak position
Australian Albums (ARIA)	4
Austrian Albums (Ö3 Austria)	1
Canada Top Albums/CDs (RPM)	45
Dutch Albums (Album Top 100)	1
European Albums (European Top 100 Albums)	1
German Albums (Offizielle Top 100)	1
Hungarian Albums (MAHASZ)	1
New Zealand Albums (RMNZ)	10
Norwegian Albums (VG-lista)	1
Portuguese Albums (AFP)	1
Swedish Albums (Sverigetopplistan)	1
Swiss Albums (Schweizer Hitparade)	1
UK Albums (Official Charts)	4
US Billboard 200	13
US Heatseekers Albums (Billboard)	1

=== Year-end charts ===
1993 year-end chart performance for Bigger, Better, Faster, More!
Chart (1993)	Position
Australian Albums (ARIA)	48
Austrian Albums (Ö3 Austria)	2
Dutch Albums (Album Top 100)	49
European Albums (European Top 100 Albums)	9
European Debut Albums (European Top 100 Albums)	2
German Albums (Offizielle Top 100)	5
New Zealand Albums (RMNZ)	42
Swiss Albums (Schweizer Hitparade)	6
UK Albums (OCC)	63
US Billboard 200	55

1994 year-end chart performance for Bigger, Better, Faster, More!
Chart (1994)	Position
New Zealand Albums (RMNZ)	49

=== Singles ===
Singles
Year	Single	Chart	Peak
1993	"Spaceman"	Mainstream Rock Tracks	39
1993	"What's Up?"	Mainstream Rock Tracks	16
1993	"What's Up?"	Billboard Hot 100	14
1993	"What's Up?"	Top 40 Mainstream	15

== Certifications and sales ==
Certifications and sales for Bigger, Better, Faster, More!
Region	Certification	Certified units/sales
Australia (ARIA)	Gold	65,000
Austria (IFPI Austria)	2× Platinum	100,000^{*}
Canada (Music Canada)	Platinum	100,000^{^}
France (SNEP)	Gold	100,000^{*}
Germany (BVMI)	3× Gold	825,000
Japan	—	24,000
Mexico	—	225,000
Netherlands (NVPI)	Gold	50,000^{^}
New Zealand (RMNZ)	Platinum	15,000^{^}
Spain (Promusicae)	Platinum	100,000^{^}
Sweden (GLF)	Gold	50,000^{^}
Switzerland (IFPI Switzerland)	2× Platinum	100,000^{^}
United Kingdom (BPI)	Gold	160,000
United States (RIAA)	Platinum	1,500,000
Summaries
Worldwide	—	6,000,000
^{*} Sales figures based on certification alone.^{^} Shipments figures based on certification alone.
