= Dawn Richardson =

American drummer

- Born: April 19, 1964 (age 62); Los Angeles, California, U.S.
- Genres: Indie rock, power pop
- Occupation: Drummer
- Instruments: Drums, percussion
- Years active: 1989–present
- Member of: 4 Non Blondes; The Loud Family; Kindness; Mental 99
- Website: dawnrichardsondrums.com

Dawn Richardson (born April 19, 1964) is an American rock drummer, teacher, and writer of instructional books on percussion. She is best known as drummer of the San Francisco-based band 4 Non Blondes.

== Musical career ==
=== Early life and education ===
Dawn Richardson was born in Pasadena, California. At the age of 13, after a friend's idea to learn a new instrument intrigued her, she broke away from playing the trombone and picked up a set of drumsticks instead. Richardson began taking lessons from Jim Volpe, a drum teacher and "local rock guy" in Southern California.

Richardson earned her undergraduate degree in music, concentrating in percussion, at California State University, Los Angeles. She has studied with the principal percussionist of the Los Angeles Philharmonic, and with studio musicians such as Steve Houghton and Greg Goodall.

=== 4 Non Blondes ===
Richardson joined the band 4 Non Blondes in 1991, after the band had achieved local popularity in the San Francisco area. At the time, 4 Non Blondes had just been signed to Interscope Records. Richardson met the band through mutual friends and was asked to audition for them after the departure of their original drummer, Wanda Day. Richardson was hired directly after her audition, and relocated from Hollywood to San Francisco.

The group's 1992 debut album Bigger, Better, Faster, More! received Gold and Platinum status in the US, was the No. 1 album in eight countries, went Gold in 16 countries, and went Platinum in seven. In 1993, the band's single "What's Up?", a rock song written by lead singer Linda Perry, topped the charts, reaching No. 1 in twelve countries. However, after touring North America and Europe, the group disbanded in 1994 while in the middle of recording their second album.

On May 11, 2014, Richardson and 4 Non Blondes reunited to perform at the Beverly Hilton in Los Angeles, in a fundraiser to benefit the Los Angeles Gay & Lesbian Center.

=== 4 Non Blondes Reunion Update ===
In 2025, Richardson reunited with 4 Non Blondes, alongside the original lineup, performing at BottleRock Napa Valley in May 2025 and continuing with additional performances throughout the year. Richardson is currently recording a new studio album with 4 Non Blondes, the first in more than three decades, scheduled for release in 2027.

=== Other career aspects ===
In addition to 4 Non Blondes, Richardson has been a member of bands such as The Loud Family, The Martinis (featuring Joey Santiago of the Pixies), Bad Radio, Dolorata, and Kindness. With Joe Gore, she formed the instrumental duo Mental 99. She has performed, recorded, or toured with Tracy Chapman, Shana Morrison, Penelope Houston, Gus, Angel Corpus Christi, and The Paul & John.

She is the author of six books, including an instructional book with an accompanying video, Chart Topping Drum Fills (2014).

Richardson plays music and teaches drum lessons in San Francisco.

== Bibliography ==
Richardson has six book publications, all focused on teaching, mastering, and appreciating the art of drumming.

- Building Blocks of Rock: Fundamental Patterns and Exercises for the Rock Drummer (1998)
- Dawn Richardson's Fill Workbook: Short Fills and the Tools to Create Your Own (2005)
- Block Rockin' Beats: Funky Rock, Hip-hop, Jungle, Drum 'n' Bass Grooves (2006)
- Beginning Rock Drum Chart (2010)
- Kid's Rock Drum Method (2011)
- Chart-Topping Drum Fills: The 60s Through Today (2014)

Richardson has also written articles and conducted interviews for magazines such as Drum! and Edge (Drum Workshop), the online magazine Percussion Sessions, and for the Pacific Drums web site.

== Discography ==
=== With 4 Non Blondes ===
- Bigger, Better, Faster, More! (1992) (Interscope Records)
- Wayne's World 2 (soundtrack) (1993) – "Mary's House"
- If I Were a Carpenter (1994) – "Bless the Beasts and Children"
- Airheads (soundtrack) (1994) – "I'm the One"
- Encomium (Led Zeppelin tribute album) (1995) – "Misty Mountain Hop"

=== With Kindness ===
- Kindness (1999)
- Welcome to Planet Excellent (2000)
- Monkey Not Included (2002)

=== Additional releases ===
- The Loud Family (Alias Records) – Interbabe Concern (August 1996)
- Penelope Houston (Normal Records) – Loners, Stoners and Prison Brides – two tracks (2000)
- Jenifer McKitrick - Glow (2001)
- Go Go Market (Innerstate Records) – Hotel San Jose – two tracks (2002)
- Lillix (Maverick Records) – Falling Uphill – three tracks (2003)
- Blame Sally – Blame Sally (2004)
- CJ (Suite A Records) – FUNdamentals (2005)
- Erika Luckett (Birdfish Records) – Unexpected (2005)
- Penelope Houston (Devoted Ruins/Glitterhouse Records) – On Market Street (2012)
- Alphabet Rockers – Alphabet Rockers (2007)
- Toby Beard – Sleeptalk (2010)
- Dolorata – Dolorata (2010)
- Mental 99 – Mental 99 (2011)
- Marca Cassidy – Songs from the Well (2014)
- Katharine Cole - There is No God (2013)
