= Desktop Publishing Magazine =

American magazine

Desktop Publishing magazine (ISSN 0884-0873) was founded, edited, and published by Tony Bove and Cheryl Rhodes of TUG/User Publications, Inc., of Redwood City, California.). Its first issue appeared in October 1985, and was created and produced on a personal computer with desktop publishing software (PageMaker on a Macintosh), preparing output on a prototype PostScript-driven typesetting machine from Mergenthaler Linotype Company. Erik Sandberg-Diment, a columnist at The New York Times, tried to buy the venture outright when he saw an early edition.

Its premier issue included an interview with John Warnock of Adobe Systems (creator of PostScript) by August Mohr, an article about the first electronic news column for the computer industry (Newsbytes published by Wendy Woods), and a review of PageMaker. The editors defined desktop publishing as a new application for producing words and pictures using personal computers. "It has become cost-effective for almost anyone using a personal computer to prepare documents that appear professionally published. The new publishing tools put book making, newsletter publishing, magazine design, ad layout, manual production, and promotional literature publishing into the hands of personal computer users who never before had the opportunity to do these things." Contributing editors and columnists included Paul Saffo, Ted Nelson, Ron Jeffries, Ted Nace, August Mohr, David Needle, Steve Rosenthal, and Arthur Naiman.

Three issues were published before the magazine was purchased in March 1986 by PC World Communications, the San Francisco-based subsidiary of IDG and the parent company of PC World. (The magazine was then renamed Publish! with Bove and Rhodes staying as contributing editors.)
