= Shaunna Hall =

American composer and musician (born 1963)

Shaunna Elizabeth Hall
- Born: Shaunna Elizabeth Hall; July 28, 1963 (age 63)
- Occupation: Musician
- Website: shaunnahall.com

Shaunna Hall (born July 28, 1963) is an American composer and musician from the San Francisco Bay Area. As guitarist, she was a founding member of the band 4 Non Blondes and is currently a member of George Clinton's Parliament-Funkadelic.

== Early life ==
Hall played trumpet in school, studying under Jon Simms, the founder of the San Francisco Gay Freedom Day Marching Band and Twirling Corps, at Benjamin Franklin Intermediate School in Daly City, California. She started taking the guitar seriously as a teenager at Serramonte High School, and studied songwriting at the Blue Bear School of Music in San Francisco with Bonnie Hayes.

== 1980s ==
Hall joined her first band, The Crash Puppies, in the early 1980s. In the late 1980s, she and bassist Christa Hillhouse formed Cool and Unusual Punishment, a new wave duo. Later, they joined, along with drummer Wanda Day, The Lesbian Snake Charmers, led by singer Jai Jai Noire. Hall met vocalist Linda Perry, and when The Lesbian Snake Charmers broke up, they co-founded the alternative rock group 4 Non Blondes with Perry, Hillhouse, and Day in 1989.

== 1990s ==
In 1990, 4 Non Blondes won the SF Weekly Award (Wammies) for Best Rock Band. Bigger, Better, Faster, More! by Interscope Records was released in 1992 and was the only studio album released by the band. It includes performances and five compositions by Hall including "Morphine & Chocolate" and "Spaceman". Hall left the band in 1992 during the recording of "Bigger, Better, Faster, More!" over musical differences with the band as well as with the producer. The album was completed with session guitarist Louis Metoyer.

Hall and Pat Wilder subsequently founded Bad Dog Play Dead in 1992. The all-female ensemble played funk, rock, country and pop songs written largely by Hall and Wilder, and the group reunited Hall and 4 Non Blondes drummer Wanda Day. The band played live in San Francisco for several months until December 1992.

Hall played as a part of the agro-core hard rock band The Alcohol of Fame from 1993 to 1995. The group began as an ensemble Hall put together to perform a benefit for Day at the I-Beam in San Francisco in early 1993. Their first official performance was at Female Trouble's "The Dykemare Before Christmas" in December 1993.

In 1996, Hall and Tribe 8, Bay Area queercore pioneers, joined Nirvana, Soundgarden, Joan Jett, The Gits, and others on the Home Alive! Compilation. The project raised funds and awareness for self-defense education for women in honor of Mia Zapata, the singer of The Gits who was beaten and murdered while walking home.

Hall appears on the Tribe 8 CD Fist City. She co-produced Tribe 8's Role Models for America released in 1998 on Alternative Tentacles.

Throughout the 1990s, Hall played with the theatrical six-piece group The Eric McFadden Experience. In 1998, the group received the SF Weekly Award Wammies for Best Americana Band and released Our Revels Now are Ended. The CD includes one Hall composition, "Macaroon", which also appeared on an early 4 Non Blondes demo.

== 2000s ==
Alien Lovestock's 2000 CD Planet of Fish includes the composition "Alien Love" co-written by Hall, Eric McFadden and George Clinton.

Storm, Inc. started in the summer of 1999 when Hall sat in with singer Storm Large as a support guitarist for acoustic gigs. She composed eight tracks for the independent release The Calm Years in 2001. Hall and Storm, Inc. wrote and created The Calm Years. and toured the US west coast following its release.

As a sound designer, Hall helped create the first online video game "Tamale Loco: Rumble in the Desert II", developed by Shockwave in 2000.

In the summer of 2001, she played with Dog Ass, a trio with Los Angeles drummer Becky Wreck and bassist Christy Michel. Formed specifically to play a Breast Cancer Awareness benefit presented by Loudithfaire, a festival celebrating lesser-known women in rock, the trio gave a few shows in San Francisco and Los Angeles, before Hall moved to Barcelona in 2002.

Hall wrote, produced, and directed a short film called The Beauty of Betrayal in 2002, featuring her composition Beauty Sleeps recorded in San Francisco and Los Angeles. Hall appears in the film, along with actress Natalie Richie.

In July 2002, Hall began touring with George Clinton and Parliament-Funkadelic (P-Funk). She was the monitor engineer from 2002 to 2004. She became the first official female guitarist of P-Funk in 2007.

Hall was a panelist for the 2000 and 2005 ROCKRGRL Music Conference.

Hall and Dutch artist Margot van Ham shared a studio in Barcelona from 2004 to 2006. In 2004, Hall released a video The Third Eye. The video was released in 2006 as a part of Hall's multimedia project, Electrofunkadelica: e3+FUNKnth = music for the body, mind & soul.

In 2007, Hall appeared on the BBC program The 100 Most Annoying Pop Songs We Hate To Love, which featured the 4 Non Blondes song "What's Up? at number 91 on the list.

Hall joined a number of artists for former artist liaison and backstage manager Tiffany Travalent's benefit in San Francisco in 2007. Led by Eric McFadden, a group of musicians including Bernie Worrell (P-Funk), Dawn Silva (Brides of Funkenstein/Sly and the Family Stone), Jerry Harrison (Talking Heads), Pete Sears, Carol Hernandez, and The Meters' drummer Ziggy Modeliste gave their time to benefit Travalent, who had large outstanding medical bills.

Hall earned two engineering credits in 2008, for Clinton's vocals on the song Heads Will Roll, for Lee "Scratch" Perry's Return of the Super Ape and George Clinton and his Gangsters of Love.

Hall returned to the United States in 2005, and continued to tour the world as a guitarist with George Clinton and Parliament-Funkadelic in The P-Funk Allstars. She became an official band member in 2007 after five years of touring as a part-time player, monitor engineer, and crew member.

She released a solo project, Electrofunkadelica, in 2006. She created a drag king character BB Kink, an electro-GoGo-love-blues guitar player. She introduced the character in late 2008 with performances in Barcelona at Sala Monasterio and San Francisco at Anon Salon.

In 2017 she appeared in Blues is a woman in San Francisco. The line up included Jane Wenger.

== Discography ==
Year	Artist	Album	Role
1992	4 Non Blondes	Bigger, Better, Faster, More!	Guitar, songwriter
1992	Hyde St. Demo	Bad Dog Play Dead	Songwriter, guitar
1993	Positive Sound Massive	"Sex & Guns" and "Unity"	
1994	The Alcohol of Fame	Mendocino Demo Session 1994	Songwriter, guitar
1995	The Alcohol of Fame	Gush Demo '95	Songwriter, guitar
1995	Nicodemus	Dance Hall Giant	Guitar
1995	Tribe 8	Roadkill Cafe	Guest guitar
1996	Various Artists	Home Alive: The Art of Self Defense	Guitar
1997	Eric McFadden	Who's Laughing Now	Guitar
1998	Tribe 8	Role Models for Amerika	Guest guitar, backing vocals, co-producer
1998	The Eric McFadden Experience	Our Revels Now Are Ended	Guitar, songwriter
1999	The Flying Other Bros.	Demo & IPO	Producer, engineer
2000	The Flying Other Bros.	Secondary	Producer, engineer
2001	Storm, Inc.	The Calm Years	Guitar, backing vocals, songwriter
2001	Alien Lovestock	Planet of Fish	Songwriter
2002	Eric McFadden	Eric McFadden	Guitar
2004	420 Funk Mob	Alive in Spain	Guitar
2006	Eric McFadden	Dementia	Guitar
2006	Electrofunkadelica	e3+funknth=	Guitar, producer, songwriter
2008	Lee "Scratch" Perry	Return of the Super Ape	Engineer
2008	George Clinton	George Clinton and His Gangsters of Love	Engineer

== Video projects and performance videos ==
Second wind, Beauty of betrayal, The 3rd eye, Going to the Hukilau, Good Thoughts, Bad Thoughts, Stellar Evolution, Details, George Clinton and the P-Funk All Stars Cosmic Slop.
