= Minnesota (band) =

Eurodance band from Germany

- Origin: Germany
- Genres: Eurodance
- Years active: 1993-1994
- Labels: Coconut Records
- Past members: Thomas Allison; Ralf Kappmeier

Minnesota was a Eurodance group formed in Germany. It was created by Thomas Allison and Ralf Kappmeier, two German producers. They released two singles, their first was "What's Up", a cover of the 4 Non Blondes song. It peaked at number 22 on the Swiss Singles Chart and reached number one on the RPM Dance Chart in Canada. Their second single, "Without You" peaked at number 39 on the Swiss Singles Chart.

== Discography ==
=== Singles ===
Year	Single	Peak chart positions				Album
Year	Single	BEL (Vl)	CAN Dance	FIN	SWI	Album
1993	"What's Up"	18	1		22	Singles only
1994	"Without You"	—		9	39	Singles only
"—" denotes releases that did not chart
