= Paul Myers (musician) =

Canadian singer

- Born: 11 November 1960 (age 65); Toronto, Ontario, Canada
- Genre: Indie rock
- Occupations: Author; journalist; musician; songwriter

Paul Myers (born 11 November 1960) is a Canadian author, journalist, musician and songwriter. Until 2006, Myers worked as a musician and journalist in Toronto and Vancouver, where he became a television and radio personality. He is the older brother of the Canadian-British actor and comedian Mike Myers.

== Career ==
In the 1990s, Myers was the front man and songwriter for the band The Gravelberrys, which had a Canadian alternative hit in the early 1990s with "Wonder Where You Are Tonight." The group, which took its name from a reference in The Flintstones, disbanded in 1995, after several complete lineup changes.

Myers, in electronic music, is Flam!.

In 1995, Myers began his journalism career in Toronto. Since that time, he has written for a wide variety of periodicals and newspapers, including Canadian outlets The Globe and Mail, The Vancouver Sun, The Vancouver Province, and Canadian Musician, and American publications including Mix, Electronic Musician, Crawdaddy! and the San Francisco Bay Guardian.

In 2001, Myers' first long form book, was the authorized biography of the Barenaked Ladies, Public Stunts, Private Stories, published in Canada by Madrigal Press and in the US by Simon & Schuster's Fireside Books imprint.

From 2001 to 2006, Myers was in Vancouver, British Columbia, holding a variety of positions during this time. Myers was the musician judge on the Canwest Global reality TV series, Popstars: The One, and blogged about his experience for the Vancouver Province.

Myers and Patrick Maliha were known to viewers of Shaw TV's Urban Rush as The Movie Guys, appearing in a popular weekly segment which ran from 2003 until 2006, when Myers left Vancouver for the San Francisco area. Myers was also briefly a regular cultural pundit on CTV's The Vicki Gabereau Show, a national daytime program which taped out of Vancouver.

Between 2003 and 2004, Myers hosted a talk radio show on CHMJ (then branded as "MOJO Radio") in Vancouver. The show was first known as One, Two, Three with Paul Myers (after its 1:00 to 3:00 time slot), before being rechristened The Paul Myers Show. The show attained cult status, and Myers played host to diverse guests such as They Might Be Giants, Matthew Sweet, Seth MacFarlane, Errol Morris, Randy Bachman and Rick Nielsen from Cheap Trick, as well as local musicians and touring authors. CHMJ, a Corus radio station, abandoned broader talk radio in 2004 in favour of an all-sports format. Myers joked that despite his acquisition of a Vancouver Canucks jersey, his culture- and music-based topics no longer fit on the sports channel.

In 2007, his second book, a biography of Long John Baldry called It Ain't Easy: Long John Baldry and the Birth of the British Blues, was published by Greystone Books in Fall 2007.

While researching the Baldry book, Myers met Vancouver filmmaker Nick Orchard, who enlisted him to write the script and appear in his documentary Long John Baldry: In The Shadow Of The Blues. The film has received repeated airing on both the Canadian Bravo network and BBC 4 in the UK. In 2008, Myers was personally nominated for a Gemini Award (the Canadian Emmy) for Best Writing in a Documentary Program or Series, for his work on Orchard's film.

In 2010, Jawbone Press published Myers' third book, A Wizard, a True Star: Todd Rundgren in the Studio, a detailed history of the record production career of the Philadelphia-born guitarist and producer. The book featured interviews with Rundgren and many of his production clients, including Patti Smith, XTC, Meat Loaf, New York Dolls, Cheap Trick, Psychedelic Furs, Grand Funk, and Hall & Oates. The book was critically acclaimed and received four star reviews from the British magazines MOJO and Record Collector.

In 2014, Myers continued to write, record and play sporadic shows, appearing since 2014 as The Paul & John, a San Francisco-based duo formed by Myers and John Moremen, performing with drummers that have included D. J. Bonebrake and Dawn Richardson. The Paul & John have released one album, Inner Sunset (2014). Kickstarter was used to fund upfront costs of a vinyl pressing.

On 23 October 2018, House of Anansi Press published Myers' fourth book, Kids In the Hall: One Dumb Guy. The book's release was preceded and followed by a promotional speaking tour discussing the history of the comedy troupe, Kids in the Hall, featuring some members of the cast. On 21 September 2018, Myers was joined at the Crows Nest Theatre in Toronto by Bruce McCulloch and Scott Thompson as part of the Toronto Sketch Comedy Festival. In January 2019, Myers was joined in conversation about the book by four of the five Kids in the Hall: Dave Foley, Kevin McDonald, Mark McKinney and Scott Thompson at the Castro Theatre in San Francisco as part of Sketchfest 2019.

In October 2025, his fifth book, John Candy: A Life In Comedy was released. On October 27th Myers was interviewed by his younger brother Mike at The Strand in New York in front of a live audience.

== Personal life ==
Fast Company notes he resided in Berkeley, California in 2014.

== Bibliography ==
- Myers, Paul (2001). Barenaked Ladies: Public Stunts, Private Stories. Madrigal Press. ISBN 978-1-89416-002-5.
- Myers, Paul (2007). It Ain't Easy: Long John Baldry and the Birth of the British Blues. Greystone Books Ltd. p. 1. ISBN 978-1-55365-200-7.
- Myers, Paul (2010). A Wizard, a True Star: Todd Rundgren in the Studio. Jawbone Press. ISBN 978-1-90600-233-6.
- Myers, Paul (2018). Kids In the Hall: One Dumb Guy. House of Anansi Press. ISBN 9781487001834.

== See also ==
- List of Canadian musicians
