= Jim Warren (computer specialist) =

American computer businessman (1936–2021)

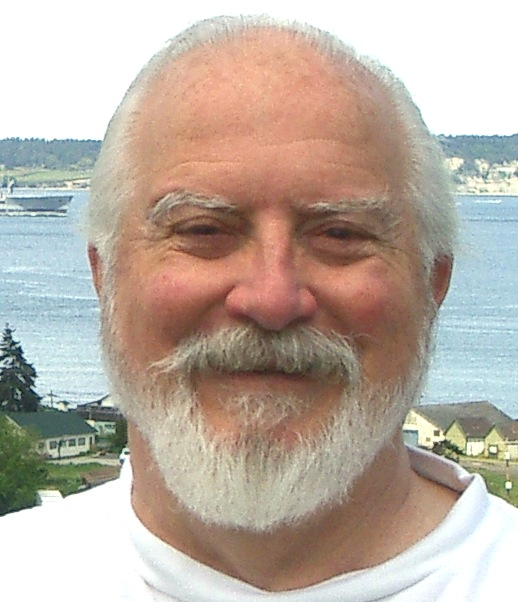
- Warren in 2010
- Born: James Clarke Warren Jr. July 20, 1936; Oakland, California, U.S.
- Died: November 24, 2021 (aged 85); Silverdale, Washington, U.S.
- Education: Southwest Texas State University; University of Texas; Stanford University
- Occupations: Computer professional; Editor and publisher; Activist
- Spouse: Malee Warren

James Clarke Warren Jr. (July 20, 1936 – November 24, 2021) was an American computer professional, editor, and activist.

Warren co-founded the West Coast Computer Faire, and was the creator of the publication that became InfoWorld.

== Early life and education ==
Warren was born in Oakland, California; he was an only child. His father, Jim Warren Sr., piloted military transport aircraft during World War II, and Jim Jr. was raised in San Antonio, Texas. He graduated from Southwest Texas State University with a degree in mathematics and education and then on a National Science Foundation grant earned a master's degree in mathematics and statistics from the University of Texas.

== Early career ==
Warren had his first full-time teaching contract, for an annual salary of US$2,987, when he was 20 years old and had completed only three years of college. In the ensuing decade, he was also a National Science Foundation Guest Lecturer, was the founder and Director of Summer Mathematics Institutes at Our Lady of the Lake University in San Antonio, Texas, and earned national recognition for innovative weekly enrichment programs he created for secondary school students, and for in-service programs for elementary and secondary school teachers, all without cost, as Chair of the Alamo District [South Texas] Council of Teachers of Mathematics (1960–1962).

In 1964, inspired by a Look magazine cover, he left Texas and moved to the San Francisco Bay Area, which he later said felt like coming home. He was hired to teach mathematics at the College of Notre Dame in Belmont, a small Catholic liberal arts college, where he became department chairman. He participated in anti-war rallies, supported the Free Speech Movement, and was involved in the Midpeninsula Free University, serving as its general secretary and creating and editing its magazine, The Free You. He threw large parties at his house in Woodside, with free love, nudity, and drugs, one of which was filmed for a BBC documentary. An article in the San Francisco Chronicle on the parties, in which he was not named, led to his forced resignation from his job.

== Computing ==
He found a job as a computer programmer at the Stanford Medical Center, where he built on the basic skills he had from IBM mainframe computing at the University of Texas. He later completed a master's degree in computer engineering at Stanford University. He worked as a freelance minicomputer programmer and computer consultant under the name Frelan Associates (for "free land"), creating control programs for various high-tech companies around Silicon Valley, and chaired the Association for Computing Machinery's regional chapters of SIGPLAN, SIGMICRO and the San Francisco Peninsula ACM. He also taught computer courses at Stanford, San Jose State University, and San Francisco State University.

In 1977, Warren co-founded the West Coast Computer Faire, which, for a half-dozen years, was the largest public microcomputer convention in the world. He was its self-titled "Faire Chaircreature", organizing eight conventions. In 1983, he sold the Faire to Prentice-Hall, "for 100% down; nothin' to pay".

Warren founded and co-founded a number of computer publications. To promote the Computer Faires and circulate news and gossip about the then-infant microcomputer industry, he founded and edited the first free tabloid newspaper about microcomputing, the irregular Silicon Gulch Gazette (SGG), published from issue #0 in February 1977, through issue #43, in January 1986, with one issue named Business Systems Journal. He was also the founding editor of Dr. Dobb's Journal of Computer Calisthenics & Orthodontia, the first computer magazine to focus on microcomputer software, created and published by the nonprofit People's Computer Company.

Beginning in 1978, Warren created and published Intelligent Machines Journal (IMJ, which is also Pig Latin for "Jim"), the first subscription news periodical about microcomputing, published as a tabloid newspaper, with Tom Williams as its founding editor. Warren sold IMJ in late 1979, to Patrick McGovern, the founder of the International Data Group, who quickly renamed it to InfoWorld as his first microcomputer periodical. He also founded and published the short-lived DataCast magazine, edited by Tony Bove and Cheryl Rhodes, focused on in-depth tutorials about specific microcomputer programs, and was the founder and producer of the equally ill-fated Video Initiative, providing similar self-paced videotape tutorials.

He also hosted the first two seasons of PBS television's Computer Chronicles, originated at the College of San Mateo's KCSM-TV, Channel 60, 1981–1982.

From 1990 to 1995, he was a member of the Board of Directors of Autodesk, one of the best-known publishers of computer-aided design programs for microcomputers, with AutoCAD as its flagship product. At the time, it was one of the largest microcomputer software publishers, with a market capitalization sometimes near a billion dollars. His tenure there including presenting Autodesk's position opposing software patents, and chairing the Board's CEO Search Committee that found and selected Carol Bartz as its CEO.

== Activism ==
Warren founded and chaired the first Computers, Freedom and Privacy Conference, held in 1991. The conferences have continued, under other leadership, for more than 25 years, consistently drawing national and international attention and attendance.

In 1993, he assisted Debra Bowen pro-bono, then a freshman member of the California State Assembly, in drafting Assembly Bill 1624 and organized much of the statewide support that helped it pass four committee votes and three floor votes without a single dissenting vote. When the law took effect on January 1, 1994, it made California the first state in the nation to open all of its computerized public legislative records, statutes, constitution and regulations, to fee-free access via the Internet. In this influential bill, he described the Internet, which was relatively unknown at the time, as "the largest nonproprietary, nonprofit cooperative public computer network". This was necessary to forestall objections from naive politicians to giving away public records to a private Internet "company".

In 1995–1996, Warren served on the Advisory Panel on Electronic Filings of the California Secretary of State. This panel advised the Secretary on how-best to implement new mandates for computerizing political-campaign financial statements, and making them timely-available to the public in electronic form without excessive fees.

In 1996–1997, he served on the California Senate's Task Force on Electronic Access to Public Records, that produced recommendations regarding how to make computerized state and local public government records available to the public in electronic form. Warren was one of the minority who advocated online access without agency fees, and charging no more than the direct incremental cost of copying, when copies were requested in physical form. The majority of Task Force members were from city and county agencies, almost entirely advocating making the records available in electronic form, but only for fees far in excess of direct copying costs.

== Political career ==
In the 1980s, Warren was elected countywide to the board of trustees of the three-college San Mateo County Community College District.

In 1986, knowing he had no chance of winning, Warren nonetheless ran unsuccessfully for San Mateo County Supervisor against the then President of the County Board of Supervisors, Anna Eshoo, as a protest of her representation of the county's rural minority that composed much of her supervisorial district.

== Other works ==
Aside from the several periodicals and conference proceedings mentioned above, Warren also created, published and edited the Peninsula Citizens' Advocate tabloid newspaper, addressing local rural political issues (very irregularly, 1984–1986).

Warren was the Futures columnist for Microtimes, writing a monthly "Realizable Fantasies" column (1990–2001); the Government Access columnist for Boardwatch magazine (1994–1996), and the Public Access columnist for Government Technology magazine (1993–1996, 2000). Warren also wrote the nontechnical "Coastside Curmudgeon" column for the Half Moon Bay Review, Half Moon Bay, CA (1994–1996).

He also wrote the first invited, refereed survey of early personal computer developments in Computer magazine, a 15-year retrospective called "We, The People, In The Information Age" in Dr. Dobb's Journal, January 1991, etc.

== Personal life and death ==
Warren was married to Malee Warren. He died in Silverdale, Washington on November 24, 2021, from lung cancer.

== Awards ==
- First-year recipient of the Electronic Frontier Foundation's Pioneer Award (1992)
- The Hugh M. Hefner First Amendment Award from the Playboy Foundation (1994)
- The James Madison Freedom-of-Information Award from the Society of Professional Journalists, Northern California (1994)
- The John Dvorak Lifetime Achievement Award (1995)
