= Public Stunts Private Stories =

Public Stunts, Private Stories
- First edition
- Author: Paul Myers
- Language: English
- Genre: Biography
- Publisher: Madrigal Press
- Publication date: 2001, rev. 2003
- Publication place: Canada
- Media type: Print (Paperback)
- Pages: 262

Public Stunts, Private Stories is the authorized biography of the Canadian alternative rock group Barenaked Ladies. The book was written by friend of the band and fellow Scarborough, Ontario native Paul Myers (brother of actor Mike Myers). The biography was originally published in 2001 in Canada by Madrigal Press and was published in the US in a revised 2003 edition by Simon & Schuster with a different cover, certain corrections, and added details concerning the band's greatest hits compilation, Disc One: All Their Greatest Hits (1991–2001). As of 2020, it is the band's only authorized biography.

== See also ==
- Barenaked Ladies
