= Spaceman (4 Non Blondes song) =

1993 single by 4 Non Blondes

Single by 4 Non Blondes

from the album Bigger, Better, Faster, More!
- B-side: "Pleasantly Blue"
- Released: September 1993
- Studio: Groove Masters (Santa Monica, California)
- Genre: Rock
- Length: 3:40
- Label: Interscope; Atlantic
- Songwriters: Linda Perry; Shaunna Hall
- Producer: David Tickle

4 Non Blondes singles chronology
"What's Up?" (1993)	"Spaceman" (1993)	"Mary's House" (1993)

Music video
- "Spaceman" on YouTube

"Spaceman" is a song by American alternative rock band 4 Non Blondes. It is the sixth track on their debut studio album, Bigger, Better, Faster, More! (1992), and was released as the album's third single in September 1993 by Interscope and Atlantic Records. The song was written by lead singer Linda Perry with guitarist Shaunna Hall and was produced by David Tickle. While the album's lead single, "What's Up?", became a worldwide hit, "Spaceman" reached the top 20 only in Austria, Iceland, Italy, and Switzerland while missing the US Billboard Hot 100. The music video for the song was directed by Scott Kalvert.

== Composition ==
"Spaceman" is composed in the key of G major and is set in common time with a slow tempo of 69 beats per minute. The song is three minutes and forty seconds long.

== Critical reception ==
Tom Demalon from AllMusic stated that the song's "yearning lyrics are delivered over a quiet, martial drum rhythm." Larry Flick from Billboard magazine wrote, "Follow-up to the gold-selling 'What's Up?' is fueled by a similar wall-shattering vocal performance. The tune itself is a strumming, guitar-anchored rock ballad, deriving much of its motion from a rolling, militaristic beat. While it is not immediately catchy, slowly ingratiating track will likely meet with warm approval at top 40 and album-rock levels." Dave Jennings from Melody Maker said, "More histrionics, this time at a slower pace and with tacky "military" drumming." Alan Jones from Music Week gave "Spaceman" a score of three out of five, adding that the song "offers pretty much the same mix [as its predecessor], with the same unrestrained vocals and loosely fitting instrumentation. But it's a less heady brew that won't fare quite so well."

== Music video ==
The song's accompanying music video was directed by American film director Scott Kalvert and filmed in Los Angeles. It features the band performing the song in several locations, including inside a house with colorful lights, in a sunny park, and under a full moon. The video was added to the playlists of MTV and The Box on the week ending September 26, 1993.

== Track listings ==
All songs were written by Linda Perry, with co-writing from Shaunna Hall on "Spaceman" and Roger Rocha on "Strange".

- US cassette single

A. "Spaceman" – 3:30
B. "Pleasantly Blue" – 2:27

- UK CD single
1. "Spaceman" – 3:40
2. "Strange" – 4:04
3. "Pleasantly Blue" – 2:27
4. "What's Up?" (remix) – 4:51
- UK 7-inch and cassette single
1. "Spaceman" – 3:40
2. "Strange" – 4:04
- UK 12-inch single

A1. "Spaceman" – 3:40
A2. "Strange" – 4:04
B1. "What's Up?" (remix) – 4:51
B2. "What's Up?" (piano version) – 4:09

== Credits and personnel ==
Credits are lifted from the Bigger, Better, Faster, More! album booklet.

Studios

- Recorded at Groove Masters (Santa Monica, California)
- Mixed and overdubbed at The Bunker (Malibu, California)
- Mastered at Precision Mastering (Los Angeles)

Personnel

- Linda Perry – writing, vocals, acoustic and electric guitar
- Shaunna Hall – writing, additional guitar
- Roger Rocha – guitar
- Christa Hillhouse – bass, vocals
- Dawn Richardson – drums
- Rory Kaplan – Mellotron
- Suzie Katayama – accordion
- David Tickle – production, recording, mixing
- Mark Hensley – engineering
- Stephen Marcussen – mastering

== Charts ==
=== Weekly charts ===
Chart (1993–1994)	Peak position
Australia (ARIA)	85
Austria (Ö3 Austria Top 40)	19
Belgium (Ultratop 50 Flanders)	24
Europe (Eurochart Hot 100)	45
Europe (European Hit Radio)	21
Germany (GfK)	28
Iceland (Íslenski Listinn Topp 40)	2
Italy (Musica e dischi)	11
Netherlands (Dutch Top 40)	32
Netherlands (Single Top 100)	25
New Zealand (Recorded Music NZ)	23
Switzerland (Schweizer Hitparade)	18
UK Singles (OCC)	53
UK Airplay (ERA)	52
US Bubbling Under Hot 100 Singles (Billboard)	17
US Album Rock Tracks (Billboard)	39

=== Year-end charts ===
Chart (1993)	Position
Iceland (Íslenski Listinn Topp 40)	43

== Release history ==
Region	Date	Format(s)	Label(s)	Ref.
United States	September 1993	Cassette	Interscope	
United Kingdom	October 4, 1993	7-inch vinyl; 12-inch vinyl; CD; cassette	Interscope	
Australia	October 18, 1993	CD; cassette	Interscope	
