= Moonalice =

American rock band

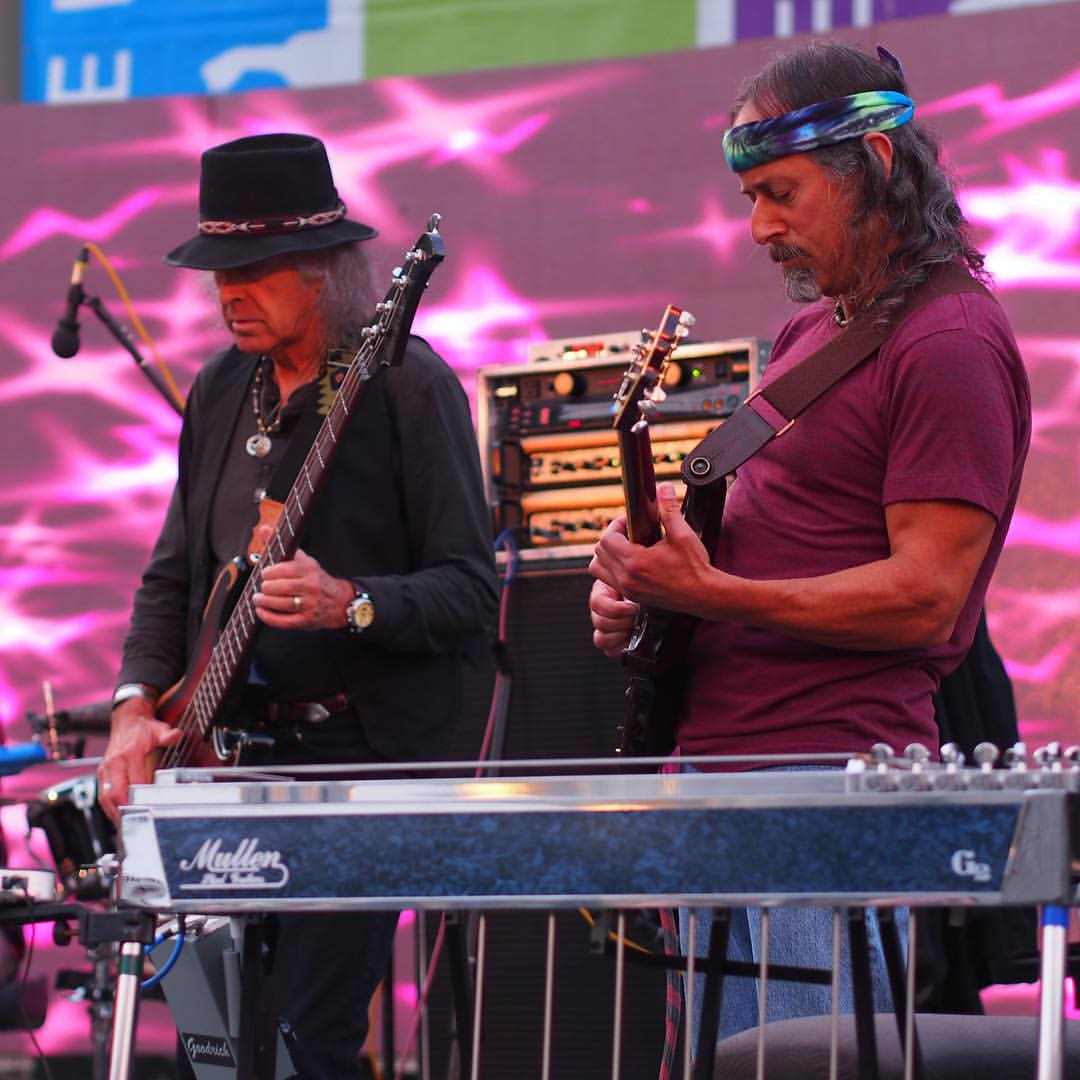
- Moonalice playing in San Francisco, 2015

Background information
- Genres: Rock
- Years active: 2007–present
- Members: Roger McNamee; Pete Sears; Barry Sless; John Molo; Jason Crosby; Lester Chambers; Dylan Chambers; Erika Tietjen; Chloe Tietjen; Rachel Tietjen
- Past members: Ann McNamee; Jimmy Sanchez; G. E. Smith; Jack Casady
- Website: Moonalice.com

Moonalice is an American rock band, formed from previous members of the Flying Other Brothers. The band has been touring since May 2007, and has come to the attention of music critics. The band is currently made up of ten musicians, and led by businessman Roger McNamee. Their eponymous debut album was recorded and released in 2009 and followed by a series of E.P.s named "Dave's Way," featuring mostly new material. In 2022, they joined Nettwerk Music Group and on April 20 released a new EP Full Moonalice Vol. 1.

The band has been consistently touring the United States and Canada since 2007 with several tour dates in 2009 featuring Jack Casady. John Molo joined the band in early 2009 and guitarist G. E. Smith left the band after playing his last show with them on December 31, 2009.

In 2021, the band expanded its lineup to ten, adding new vocalists Lester Chambers and his son Dylan Chambers, plus T Sisters Erika, Chloe and Rachel Tietjen. Their music currently is focused on the "Psychedelic Soul" sound innovated by Lester in the 1960s with his band The Chambers Brothers.

On August 28, 2012, the Rock and Roll Hall of Fame announced that the digital logs for the Moonalice song "It’s 4:20 Somewhere", had been acquired for the Library and Archives. "Libraries and archives collect, preserve and provide access to the materials that best capture important moments and movements in history, regardless of format, and the Moonalice logs help tell the story of music’s digital revolution; specifically the rise of direct-from-artist (DFA) distribution. Moonalice is the first band without a label to achieve one million downloads of a song from its own servers, direct-from-artist. “It’s 4:20 Somewhere” has been downloaded over two million times."

== Members ==
Current

- Roger McNamee a.k.a. "Chubby Wombat Moonalice" – guitar, bass, vocals (2007–present)
- Pete Sears – bass, keyboards, accordion, vocals (2007–present)
- Barry Sless – guitar, bass, pedal steel guitar, vocals (2007–present)
- John Molo – drums (2009–present)
- Jason Crosby – keyboards (2021–present)
- Lester Chambers – vocals (2021–present)
- Dylan Chambers – vocals (2021–present)
- Erika Tietjen – vocals (2021–present)
- Chloe Tietjen – vocals (2021–present)
- Rachel Tietjen – vocals (2021–present)

Former

- Ann McNamee a.k.a. "Blue Moonalice" – percussion, bass, keyboards, vocals (2007–2012)
- Jimmy Sanchez – drums (2007–2009)
- G. E. Smith – bass, guitars, vocals (2007–2009)

Occasional special guest

- Jack Casady – bass (select dates only) (2007–2009)

Fill in members

- Curt Bisquera – drums
- James "Hutch" Hutchinson - electric bass
- Mookie Siegel - keyboards

== Discography ==
- Moonalice (2009)
- High 5 (2016)
- Full Moonalice Vol. 1 (2022)
- Full Moonalice Vol. 2 (2022)
- Light Side of the Moonalice: An Acoustic Adventure (2023)
