= What's Up? (4 Non Blondes song) =

1993 single by 4 Non Blondes

Single by 4 Non Blondes

from the album Bigger, Better, Faster, More!
- B-side: "Train"
- Released: March 11, 1993
- Studio: The Plant (Sausalito, California)
- Genre: Alternative rock; pop rock
- Length: 4:55 (album/video version); 4:15 (single edit)
- Label: Interscope
- Songwriter: Linda Perry
- Producer: David Tickle (Note: While Tickle is the credited producer, Perry claims only her version was publicly released.)

4 Non Blondes singles chronology
"Dear Mr. President" (1992)	"What's Up?" (1993)	"Spaceman" (1993)

Music video
- "What's Up?" on YouTube

"What's Up?" is a song by American rock group 4 Non Blondes, released in March 1993 by Interscope Records as the second single from their debut album, Bigger, Better, Faster, More! (1992). The song was written and produced by lead singer Linda Perry. The credited producer is David Tickle; however, Perry claims only her version was released to the public.

"What's Up?" received generally positive reviews from critics; it reached number fourteen on the US Billboard Hot 100, topped the charts of 12 European countries, and entered the top 10 in five other countries. The music video for "What's Up?" was nominated for Best Alternative Rock Video at the 1993 MTV Video Music Awards.

== Background ==
The song originated long before 4 Non Blondes formed. Third Eye Blind frontman Stephan Jenkins recalled sitting in a room with Linda Perry (at that time in her life, working as a waitress nearby) performing their original compositions to one another while both were struggling musicians in San Francisco. During these sessions, the two played early versions of "Semi-Charmed Life" and "What's Up?", which would later become major hits for their respective bands. Decades later, Jenkins realized that the songs shared in that private session would go on to sell a combined 17 million records. Perry, however, denied that this session ever happened.

The title does not appear in the song's lyrics; instead, the chorus repeatedly features the line "what's going on?". The official title "What's Up?" was deliberately chosen to avoid confusion with Marvin Gaye's 1971 song "What's Going On".

== Recording and production ==
"What's Up?" was first recorded with lyrics and arrangement reworked by producer David Tickle at Groove Masters studio, as part of 4 Non Blondes' debut album Bigger, Better, Faster, More! (1992). However, Perry was dissatisfied with that recording. Perry said in an interview with Tape Op magazine:

The producer (David Tickle) had no sense of what the song was. I went to the label and said "This song sucks. This is not the song I wrote." They didn't support me. They said it sounded fine. I did not agree. I grabbed the band during a break and we went to The Record Plant in Sausalito. ... I started moving things around. The engineer there helped me a lot. I would tell him what I wanted, and if he didn't get it I would move the microphone around. Then I'd go, "Yes, that's it. That's the sound." I did that with everything. Then we got the tempo, and we got the recording of it, the base of it, done. I re-did my acoustics. I was in the middle of vocals when David Tickle showed up. I'd laid down three vocals. I was annoyed he showed up. We were already done with the frigging song. We comped the vocal and mixed it that night, and it made mastering the next day. That is the version that blew up all over the world. [...] I've told the story enough that people know that David Tickle did not produce that song. It was me.

After Interscope executives dismissed her complaints, Perry booked a recording session at The Plant for the band to re-record her original version of the song. The session took one day, and Interscope's co-owner Jimmy Iovine agreed that he preferred the re-recorded version based on Perry's demo over Tickle's. Perry's version was then used as the final version of the song.

Tickle's instrumental (over the original vocals) could be heard on Perry's episode of Behind the Music. Tickle's version was never released.

== Critical reception ==
AllMusic editor Tom Demalon described the song as a "massive, neo-hippie anthem" in his review of Bigger, Better, Faster, More! Rolf Edmund Lund from Norwegian Altaposten complimented Perry's voice as "incredibly good". Larry Flick from Billboard magazine wrote, "Gymnastic vocals, leaping from a breathy, high range, to gravelly, bar-rock blues in a single passage, front this straightforward, heartfelt rocker. Treads the line between album rock and modern rock, with the piano version favoring the former." Tom Sinclair from Entertainment Weekly described it as "funky" and added that it "is only one of the goodies in the Blondes' musical grab bag". In his weekly UK chart commentary, James Masterton viewed it as "a wonderful piece of laid back summer rock (well, almost)". Pan-European magazine Music & Media complimented it as a "strong composition", where the lyrics "are done more than justice by Linda Perry's impressive vocal touch." A Music & Media editor commented, "Toni Childs backed by a rock band playing Bobbie McFerrin's "Don't Worry, Be Happy" comes closest as a description."

Alan Jones from Music Week felt it is "charming" and "easily the best track" of the album. Steven Wells from NME named it Single of the Week, writing, "This has a nine-foot tall titanium hook and a woman singer who does a fair bit of that Bjorkish OOOOOOEEEEEOOOEEE and seems to be demanding a revolution and is extremely pissed off about the world. Ooh, she's really getting going now. Damn, but this is good." R.S. Murthi from New Straits Times called it "anthemic" and remarked that it "is probably one of the simplest and catchiest pop songs to be produced in recent times." Carmen von Rohr from Rome News-Tribune noted "the amazingly down-to earth common sense lyrics" of "What's Up?", and added that Linda Perry "sings in her rich, soulful voice about the frustrations she feels as she tries to adjust to her place in the universe." A reviewer from Sunday Life wrote that the song is "naggingly memorable". Ronny Johansen from Troms Folkeblad commented, "What a wonderful use of voice and what an irresistible song!"

Conversely, songwriters Carl Barât and Stuart Braithwaite named the song the worst ever. Musician Dean Ween said: "It's as bad as music gets... Everything about the song is so awful that if I sat down and tried to write the worst song ever, I couldn't even make it 10 percent of the reality of how awful that song is."

== Commercial performance ==
The recording received considerable airplay success. It reached number 14 on the US Billboard Hot 100 and went gold, but peaked higher in many other countries, reaching number one in Austria, Belgium, Denmark, Germany, Iceland, Ireland, the Netherlands, Norway, Sweden, and Switzerland while reaching number two in the United Kingdom and Australia. It was the best-selling song of 1993 in Austria, the Netherlands (Dutch Top 40) and Sweden.

== Music video ==
A music video was produced to promote the single. It was directed by American film director Morgan Lawley and features the band, dressed in punk clothing, performing the song as they stand in a living room set decorated with paintings. In between, there is footage of the band in a park and a playground. It was nominated in the category for Best Alternative Rock Video at the MTV Video Music Awards. The video was later published on YouTube in 2011. On February 17, 2021, "What's Up?" passed a billion views. As of August 2026, the videos has received over 2.2 billion views on YouTube.

== Legacy ==
Towards the end of the 1990s, "What's Up?" was included on Rolling Stone's "Top Ten One-Hit Wonders of the 1990s", for which Rob Sheffield wrote, "Proof that you can get rich rhyming "revolution" and "institution" while sporting the dreadlocks-and-top-hat look, which somehow failed to catch on. Thanks for the memories!" The song also ranked number 94 on VH1's "100 Greatest One-Hit Wonders" (2007) and number 86 on MuchMore's "The Top 100 One Hit Wonders" (2012).

In 2019, About.com featured "What's Up?" in their ranking of "The Best 100 Songs From the 1990s", for which Bill Lamb remarked that the song "seemingly appeared out of nowhere, becoming a neo-folkie hit first on modern rock radio stations and then on the pop charts. Although it only reached number 11, it has been a radio fixture ever since." In 2024, Forbes magazine ranked "What's Up?" number 47 in their list of "The 50 Best Songs of the 1990s". Hugh McIntyre of Forbes noted that "the song's unforgettable chorus has made it a staple for sing-alongs and karaoke nights everywhere." In 2025, Billboard magazine ranked it number 36 in their list of "The 100 Greatest LGBTQ+ Anthems of All Time".

The song is featured in the 2015 episode "What's Going On?" of the series Sense8, when the eight telepathically connected lead characters – not yet fully aware of their connection – unknowingly perform karaoke together, to the 4 Non Blondes, from their eight respective cities; a remix is played at a rave in the series' 2017 episode "Fear Never Fixed Anything". The song is featured in the 2025 episode "Janine", of the series The Handmaid's Tale, when a group of women, forced into sexual slavery under a Christian dictatorship, sing the lines "I pray / oh my God do I pray / I pray every single day / for revolution".

In 2025, a mashup crafted by TikTok user DJ AuxLord of "What's Up?" and Nicki Minaj's "Beez in the Trap" went viral on TikTok. As a result, it re-entered several charts. Perry called it "ridiculous in all the best ways, [...] I mean, it's pretty awesome, I must say. It's out of control."

== Track listings ==
- US and Australian cassette single
1. "What's Up?" (LP version)
2. "Train" (LP version)
- Australian and European CD single
1. "What's Up?" (edit) – 4:16
2. "What's Up?" (remix) – 4:51
3. "Train" – 3:47
4. "What's Up?" (piano version) – 4:09
- European 7-inch and cassette single
1. "What's Up?"
2. "What's Up?" (piano version)
- Japanese mini-CD single
1. "What's Up?"
2. "Spaceman"

== Credits and personnel ==
Credits are lifted from the Bigger, Better, Faster, More! album booklet.

Studios

- Recorded at The Plant (Sausalito, California)
- Mixed and overdubbed at The Bunker (Malibu, California)
- Mastered at Precision Mastering (Los Angeles)

4 Non Blondes

- Linda Perry – writing, vocals, acoustic and electric guitar, production
- Roger Rocha – guitar
- Christa Hillhouse – bass, vocals
- Dawn Richardson – drums

Other personnel

- David Tickle – production, recording, mixing
- Mark Hensley – engineering
- Stephen Marcussen – mastering

== Charts ==
=== Weekly charts ===
Chart (1993)	Peak position
Australia (ARIA)	2
Austria (Ö3 Austria Top 40)	1
Belgium (Ultratop 50 Flanders)	1
Canada Top Singles (RPM)	33
Denmark (IFPI)	1
Europe (Eurochart Hot 100)	1
Europe (European Hit Radio)	1
Finland (Suomen virallinen lista)	15
France (SNEP)	3
Germany (GfK)	1
Iceland (Íslenski Listinn Topp 40)	1
Ireland (IRMA)	1
Israel (Israeli Singles Chart)	6
Italy (Musica e dischi)	2
Lithuania (M-1)	1
Netherlands (Dutch Top 40)	1
Netherlands (Single Top 100)	1
New Zealand (Recorded Music NZ)	2
Norway (VG-lista)	1
Sweden (Sverigetopplistan)	1
Switzerland (Schweizer Hitparade)	1
UK Singles (Official Charts)	2
UK Airplay (Music Week)	3
US Billboard Hot 100	14
US Album Rock Tracks (Billboard)	16
US Modern Rock Tracks (Billboard)	29
US Top 40/Mainstream (Billboard)	15
US Cash Box Top 100	13

Chart (2011)	Peak position
Poland (Polish Airplay New)	1

Chart (2020)	Peak position
Slovenia (SloTop50)	48

Chart (2021)	Peak position
US Hot Rock & Alternative Songs (Billboard)	19

Chart (2025)	Peak position
Global 200 (Billboard)	113
US Hot Rock & Alternative Songs (Billboard)	11

=== Year-end charts ===
Chart (1993)	Position
Australia (ARIA)	7
Austria (Ö3 Austria Top 40)	1
Belgium (Ultratop)	2
Europe (Eurochart Hot 100)	7
Europe (European Hit Radio)	1
Germany (Media Control)	3
Iceland (Íslenski Listinn Topp 40)	6
Israel (Israeli Singles Chart)	18
Netherlands (Dutch Top 40)	1
Netherlands (Single Top 100)	3
New Zealand (RIANZ)	10
Sweden (Topplistan)	1
Switzerland (Schweizer Hitparade)	5
UK Singles (OCC)	21
UK Airplay (Music Week)	10
US Billboard Hot 100	50
US Cash Box Top 100	50

=== Decade-end charts ===
Chart (1990–1999)	Position
Austria (Ö3 Austria Top 40)	36
Belgium (Ultratop 50 Flanders)	11
Netherlands (Dutch Top 40)	14

== Certifications ==
Region	Certification	Certified units/sales
Australia (ARIA)	Platinum	70,000^{^}
Austria (IFPI Austria)	Platinum	50,000^{*}
Brazil (Pro-Música Brasil)	Gold	30,000^{‡}
Denmark (IFPI Danmark)	Platinum	90,000^{‡}
Germany (BVMI)	2× Platinum	1,000,000^{^}
Italy (FIMI)	Platinum	50,000^{‡}
Netherlands (NVPI)	Platinum	75,000^{^}
New Zealand (RMNZ)	4× Platinum	120,000^{‡}
Spain (Promusicae)	Platinum	60,000^{‡}
Sweden (GLF)	Gold	25,000^{^}
United Kingdom (BPI)	2× Platinum	1,200,000^{‡}
United States (RIAA)	Gold	700,000
^{*} Sales figures based on certification alone.^{^} Shipments figures based on certification alone.^{‡} Sales+streaming figures based on certification alone.

== Release history ==
Region	Date	Format(s)	Label(s)	Ref.
United States	March 11, 1993	Cassette	Interscope	
United Kingdom	May 31, 1993	7-inch vinyl; CD; cassette	Interscope	
Europe	June 11, 1993	7-inch vinyl; CD	Atlantic	
Australia	July 19, 1993	CD; cassette	Interscope	
Japan	September 25, 1993	Mini-CD	Interscope	

== DJ Miko version ==
"What's Up"

Single by DJ Miko

from the album The Last Millennium
- Released: 1993
- Genre: Dance
- Length: 3:45 (radio edit); 4:35 (club edit)
- Label: Hotline
- Songwriter: Linda Perry
- Producer: Hotline Records

Italian disc jockey DJ Miko covered the song as a dance track in 1993 (retitled without the question mark) with vocals provided by Italian singer Maria Capri. Capri does not appear in the music video nor on stage, as British performer Louise Gard lip-synched to Capri's vocals during live performances. Although the song was released as a stand-alone single, it later appeared on DJ Miko's sole album, The Last Millennium, in 1999. DJ Miko's version was a modest hit in Europe in late 1993 and early 1994, reaching number five in Italy and Spain, number 13 in Finland, and number 17 in Sweden.

The cover was released worldwide in mid-1994, peaking at number six on the UK Singles Chart and number eight on the Irish Singles Chart. On the Eurochart Hot 100, "What's Up" reached number 21. In the United States it reached number 58 on the Billboard Hot 100 chart and number 19 on the Billboard Dance Club Songs chart. In the Australasia region, "What's Up" was popular in New Zealand, reaching number 23 on the RIANZ Singles Chart, but it was a commercial failure in Australia, reaching number 92 on the ARIA Singles Chart.

=== Critical reception ===
In his weekly UK chart commentary, James Masterton wrote, "The biggest new hit of the week comes straight from the clubs. After setting dancefloors alight for weeks, this rather pointless dance remake of the 4 Non Blondes track crashes straight into the Top 10. As a dance track it seems to work alright but of course pales in comparison with the original which made No.2 in July last year." James Hamilton from Music Week's RM Dance Update described the song as a "truly bizarre galloping cheesy Eurodisco remake of the 4 Non Blonde's strangulatedly wailed 1993 smash". Mark Frith from Smash Hits gave it three out of five, noting that "keeping the lead vocal line and adding a techno techno techno backing is an interesting experiment, and it partly works too." He concluded, "It has enough cheek and novelty value to probably be a hit."

=== Charts ===
==== Weekly charts ====
Chart (1993–1994)	Peak position
Australia (ARIA)	92
Europe (Eurochart Hot 100)	21
Finland (Suomen virallinen lista)	13
Ireland (IRMA)	8
Israel (Israeli Singles Chart)	27
Italy (Musica e dischi)	5
New Zealand (Recorded Music NZ)	23
Scottish Singles Sales (Official Charts)	2
Spain (AFYVE)	5
Sweden (Sverigetopplistan)	17
UK Singles (Official Charts)	6
UK Club Chart (Music Week)	18
US Billboard Hot 100	58
US Dance Club Play (Billboard)	19
US Maxi-Singles Sales (Billboard)	13
US Top 40/Rhythm-Crossover (Billboard)	23
US Cash Box Top 100	72

==== Year-end charts ====
Chart (1994)	Position
UK Singles (OCC)	59
US Maxi-Singles Sales (Billboard)	23

=== Release history ===
Region	Date	Format(s)	Label(s)	Ref.
Italy	1993	12-inch vinyl; CD	Hotline	
Australia	January 17, 1994	CD; cassette	Colossal	
United Kingdom	August 1, 1994	7-inch vinyl; cassette	Systematic	

== Minnesota version ==
"What's Up"

Single by Minnesota
- B-side: "Move Your Body"
- Released: 1993
- Length: 3:38
- Label: Coconut
- Songwriter: Linda Perry
- Producer: ABM

Minnesota singles chronology
"What's Up" (1993)	"Without You" (1994)

German Eurodance group Minnesota covered the song as a dance version in late 1993. It reached number one in Portugal and on the Canadian RPM Dance chart, peaked at number two in Finland, and also charted in Belgium and Switzerland.

=== Charts ===
==== Weekly charts ====
Chart (1993–1994)	Peak position
Belgium (Ultratop 50 Flanders)	21
Canada Dance/Urban (RPM)	1
Europe (Eurochart Hot 100)	29
Finland (Suomen virallinen lista)	2
Portugal (AFP)	1
Switzerland (Schweizer Hitparade)	22

==== Year-end charts ====
Chart (1994)	Position
Canada Dance/Urban (RPM)	19

== SLACKCiRCUS version ==
"Fabulous Secret Powers"

Single by SLACKCiRCUS
- Released: May 2005
- Length: 3:42 (original); 2:14 ("HEYYEYAAEYAAAEYAEYAA" cut)
- Label: Create
- Songwriters: Linda Perry; Jay Allen
- Producer: SLACKCiRCUS

In 2005, a Fort Worth, Texas-based animation and video production company known as SLACKCiRCUS created a parody music video titled "Fabulous Secret Powers". Inspired by Fenslerfilm's G.I. Joe PSAs, the video pairs and edits footage from He-Man and the Masters of the Universe with a campy cover of "What's Up" that also interpolates "Don't Cry Out Loud" by Melissa Manchester. Although originally created in 2005, the video would not be popular and achieve Internet virality until five years later in 2010, when an edited, cut-down reupload of it was posted to YouTube by user "ProtoOfSnagem" under the title "HEYYEYAAEYAAAEYAEYAA", with the video largely becoming an Internet meme throughout the early 2010s. Since then, the "HEYYEYAAEYAAAEYAEYAA" video has amassed 233 million views, and the upload of the original "Fabulous Secret Powers" video from the SLACKCiRCUS YouTube channel has 10 million views. The meme was itself parodied by YouTube gaming channel The Yogscast in a 2013 music video that hit a million views in 24 hours. Both "What's Up?" and the "Fabulous Secret Powers" version were featured in the 2023 film Teenage Mutant Ninja Turtles: Mutant Mayhem. According to the film's director Jeff Rowe, the inclusion of the SLACKCiRCUS cover was suggested by producer and co-writer Seth Rogen during a chase scene where Rogen considered to the team that they use "a crazy version" of "What's Up". On June 2, 2026, a YouTube Short from The Tonight Show Starring Jimmy Fallon released a clip of Nicholas Galitzine, who played He-Man in the 2026 Masters of the Universe film, recreating the "HEYYEYAAEYAAAEYAEYAA" meme while combining both the 4 Non Blondes version and the SLACKCiRCUS version. Later the same week, Epic Games added Masters of the Universe outfits and cosmetics to Fortnite; among these were an emote replicating the "HEYYEYAAEYAAAEYAEYAA" scene from the "Fabulous Secret Powers" video, complete with the corresponding clip of the SLACKCiRCUS version of "What's Up?" as background music. The film itself briefly features the original 4 Non Blondes version of the song when Beast Man attacks Adam in search of the Sword of Power.
