= Flying Other Brothers =

American rock band

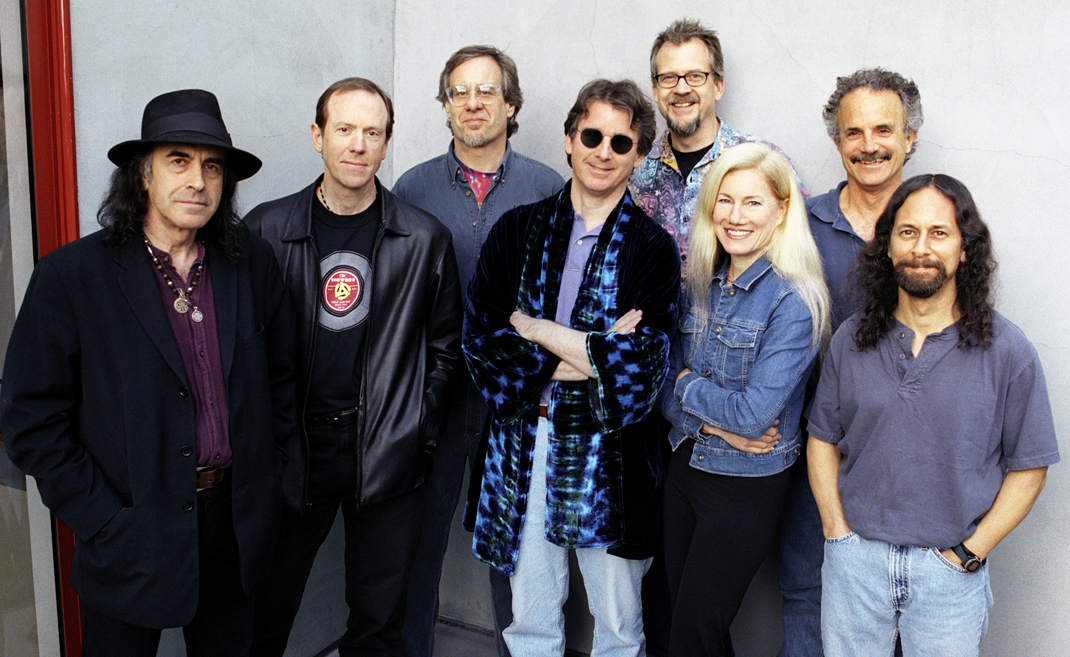
- The Flying Other Brothers (photo by Jay Blakesberg)

Background information
- Also known as: FOBs
- Origin: San Francisco, CA, USA
- Genre: Rock
- Years active: 1997–2007
- Labels: Minor Label, Alta Recordings
- Members: Bill Bennett (co-founder) "TBone" Tony Bove (co-founder); Bert Keely (co-founder); Roger McNamee (co-founder)
- Past members: Giles McNamee (1997–2001); Larry Marcus (1997–2001); Corinne Marcus (1997–2001); Dave Del Torto (1997); Ann McNamee (1999–2007); Pete Sears (2000–2007); Barry Sless (2001-2007; Jimmy Sanchez (2001–2007); G.E. Smith (2005–2007)
- Website: Official site

The Flying Other Brothers were an American rock band active from 1997 to 2006 in San Francisco.

== History ==
The band started at an Electronic Frontier Foundation (EFF) benefit at The Fillmore Auditorium in 1997. At this time the band included Roger McNamee, a venture capitalist; Giles McNamee, investment banker, board member of EFF and Roger's brother; guitarist Bert Keely of Microsoft; Bill Bennett, a marketing and communications strategist; and Tony Bove (rechristened "TBone"), author of books about computers and the Internet.

The band backed Grateful Dead members Bob Weir and Mickey Hart in a series of fund-raisers for Al Gore and Bill Clinton (Tipper Gore played congas during one Silicon Valley soiree).

The band spent three consecutive summers (2000–2002) taking a special course developed specifically for them by Jefferson Airplane guitarist Jorma Kaukonen, who assembled a faculty that included guitarist G.E. Smith, bassist Jack Casady (Kaukonen's partner in the Airplane and Hot Tuna), and pianist Pete Sears of Jefferson Starship and Hot Tuna who joined the band after these camps. Casady also produced the band's CD 52 Week High.

The band toured from 2001 to 2006 sharing concert bills with artists and bands such as Little Feat, Leftover Salmon, Country Joe McDonald, Bob Weir, Ratdog, Mickey Hart, Steve Kimock Band, Particle, and The String Cheese Incident, and have appeared on stages ranging from the Alaska State Fair to B.B. King's club in Times Square, New York City. In June 1998, the band played The Troubadour (London), and again in June 2001.

The Flying Other Brothers performed benefit concerts for groups as diverse as Seva Foundation, Camp Winnarainbow, the Lucile Packard Children's Hospital, and the Rex Foundation. The band also played as the backing band for all-star benefit concerts including one for Jefferson Airplane drummer Spencer Dryden on May 22, 2004, at Boz Scaggs's club Slim's, featuring Bob Weir, Warren Haynes, Peter Rowan, and David Nelson. The concert was put together by Pete Sears.

The band also played as the backing band for a benefit memorial concert on July 29, 2005, for concert promoter Chet Helms at the Great American Music Hall. The music was put together by Pete Sears and featured T Bone Burnett, Bob Weir, Mickey Hart, David Nelson, Country Joe McDonald, Terry Haggerty, Leigh Stephens, Bobby Vega and Joli Valenti & Friends. The $50 admission price also included a package of limited edition posters designed by such artists as Stanley Mouse, Wes Wilson, Chris Shaw, and Alton Kelley.

On May 23, 2006, the band backed Bob Weir and Mickey Hart and jammed with New Riders of the Purple Sage in a benefit for Vermont Senator Patrick Leahy at Washington, DC's Renaissance Hotel. The band's last tour in 2006 included several dates with Particle in the Pacific Northwest, a tour of Alaska, and the Hardly Strictly Bluegrass Festival in Golden Gate Park, S.F., in which T Bone Burnett joined the band for a song.

The band recorded tracks in Village Recorders, Santa Monica, CA with T Bone Burnett as producer (August 5–7, 2006) including "Take a Drive," "Another Summer of Love," and "Road to Here" released as part of the retrospective box set Circle Back!

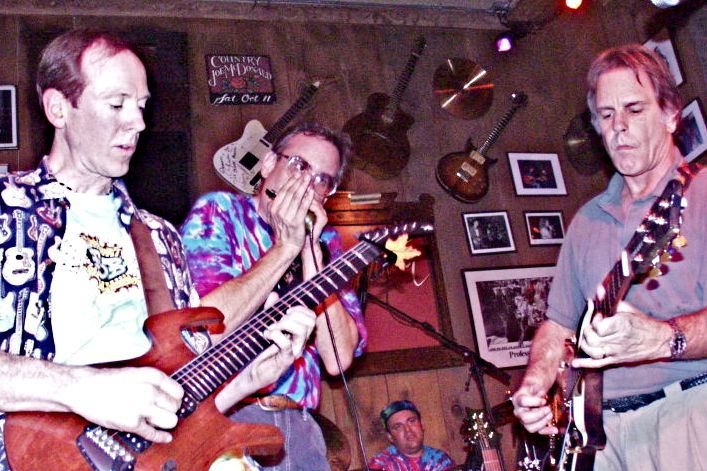
The Flying Other Brothers with Bob Weir at Sweetwater Saloon, Mill Valley, CA

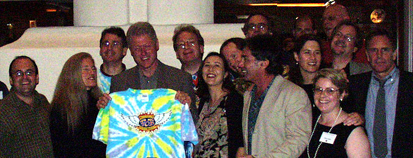
The Flying Other Brothers with Bob Weir, Mickey Hart, and Bill Clinton at Stanford University

== Personnel ==
The Flying Other Brothers included lead and pedal steel guitarist Barry Sless (Phil Lesh & Friends, David Nelson Band, Kingfish), keyboardist Pete Sears (Hot Tuna, Jefferson Starship, Rod Stewart), former Saturday Night Live Band bandleader and guitarist G.E. Smith (Bob Dylan, Hall & Oates), and drummer Jimmy Sanchez (Boz Scaggs, Dr. John, Roy Rogers, Bonnie Raitt). Guitarist Bert Keely, bassist Bill Bennett, percussionist Ann McNamee and harmonica player TBone Tony Bove shared the vocal and songwriting duties with guitarist Roger McNamee.

Previous members included Giles McNamee, guitar (1997–2001); Larry Marcus, drums (1997–2001); Corinne Marcus, percussion and vocals (1997–2001); and Dave Del Torto, drums (1997).

== Discography ==
- IPO produced by the band and Shaunna Hall for Minor Label, released October 9, 1999
- Secondary produced by the band and Stacy Parrish for Minor Label, released May 22, 2000
- 52-Week High produced by Jack Casady for Minor Label, released March 21, 2002
- San Francisco Sounds produced by the band for Minor Label, released March 8, 2005
- Estimated Charges produced by the band and Gordon Brislawn for Flying Other Brothers and Alta Recordings, released April 20, 2007
- "Take a Drive" (Bove, Keely) produced by T Bone Burnett, released May 1, 2007
- "Another Summer of Love" (Keely) produced by T Bone Burnett, released June 4, 2021
- "Road to Here" (Roger McNamee) produced by T Bone Burnett, released June 4, 2021
