= Roger McNamee =

American businessman and venture capitalist

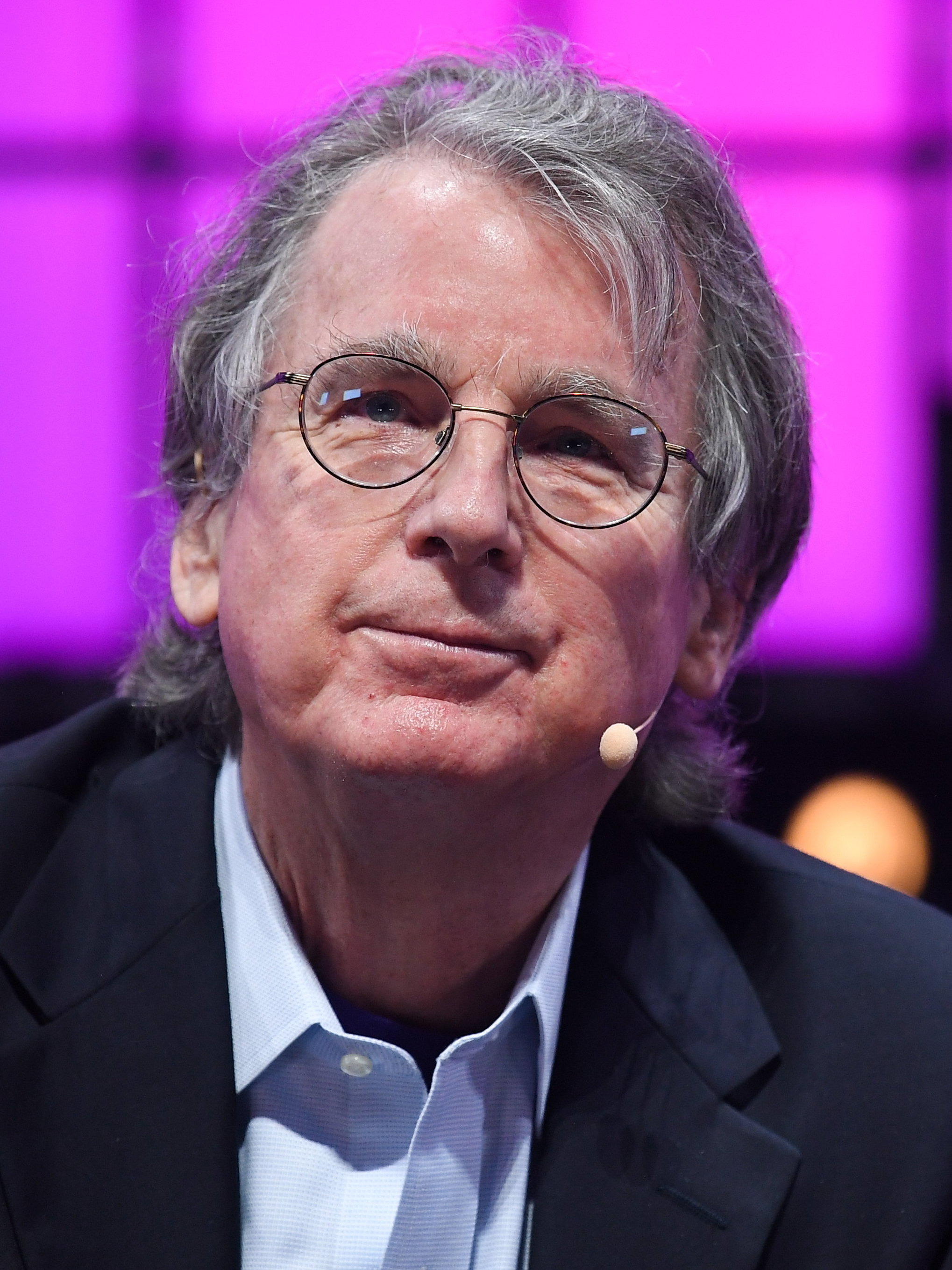
- Born: May 2, 1956 (age 70); Albany, New York, U.S.
- Education: Yale University (BA); Dartmouth College (MBA)
- Spouse: Ann McNamee (m. 1983)

Roger McNamee (born May 2, 1956) is an American businessman, investor, venture capitalist and musician. He is the founding partner of the venture capital firm Elevation Partners. Prior to co-founding the firm, McNamee co-founded private equity firm Silver Lake Partners and headed the T. Rowe Price Science and Technology Fund.

He is also a touring musician, first as a founding member of the Flying Other Brothers, and more recently in that group's follow-on band, Moonalice. Counting two groups, McNamee estimated that he had played 800 shows as of 2009.

He served as an executive producer on the 2026 film The Social Reckoning, Aaron Sorkin's companion piece to The Social Network that dramatizes the 2021 Facebook Files whistleblower case, and a fictional character (Charlie Garrigan, played by Bill Burr) is loosely based on him.

== Early life and education ==
McNamee was born on May 2, 1956, in Albany, New York. His father, Daniel, was an investment banker. He was the president of the Albany chapter of the Urban League. Barbara, his mother, was a feminist during the 60s. When McNamee was 12 years old, he protested against the Vietnam War, and volunteered for Eugene McCarthy's campaign for president. He has a Bachelor of Arts degree in history from Yale University and a Master of Business Administration (MBA) degree from the Tuck School of Business at Dartmouth College.

== Career ==
McNamee has worked for numerous employers during his career.

=== T. Rowe Price ===
McNamee joined T. Rowe Price as an analyst in 1982, after receiving his M.B.A. from the Tuck School of Business.

By 1989 he was leading the firm's Science & Technology Fund, a period when the fund returned about 17% annually to investors. In a move atypical for mutual funds, he made venture capital investments in Electronic Arts (which went public in 1989) and Sybase (which had its IPO in 1991).

=== Integral Capital Partners ===
In 1991 McNamee co-founded Integral Capital Partners with John Powell and venture capital firm Kleiner Perkins to invest in expansion stage private companies and growth-stage public companies.

=== Silver Lake Partners ===
In 1999, McNamee was one of the founding partners of leveraged buyout firm Silver Lake Partners.

=== Elevation Partners ===
In 2004, McNamee co-founded Elevation Partners along with a number of other investors including U2 frontman Bono. He currently serves as its managing director. Elevation Partners investments have included Palm, Inc., Forbes, and Facebook.

== Music career ==
McNamee is also a musician. He played in the band Flying Other Brothers from 1997 to 2006. His current band, Moonalice, formed in 2007 after acclaimed producer T Bone Burnett approached McNamee about creating a new band in the spirit of the San Francisco psychedelic era. Roger has written for, and played guitar, bass, and vocals in the band since 2007, using the stage persona of "Chubby Wombat Moonalice." In 2014 he formed a duo with Jason Crosby called the Doobie Decibel System. In 2015, The Doobie Brothers sued the band over the name.

McNamee appeared in the 2021 award-winning documentary, The Tale of the Dog, which chronicles the outsized historical impact that the Denver music venue, The Family Dog Denver, had on the changing city.

== Music and technology ==
With Elevation Partners "perhaps best known for its early investment in Facebook," McNamee said in 2013, for him, “music and technology have converged.”

He became expert on Facebook by using it to promote ... Moonalice, and now is focusing on video by live-streaming its concerts. He says musicians and top professionals share “the almost desperate need to dive deep.” This capacity to obsess seems to unite top performers in music and other fields.

McNamee is the co-writer of the Moonalice song "It's 4:20 Somewhere". In August 2012 the Rock and Roll Hall of Fame announced that the digital logs for "It’s 4:20 Somewhere" had been acquired for its library and archives, describing the Moonalice logs as helping to "...tell the story of music’s digital revolution; specifically the rise of direct-from-artist (DFA) distribution. Moonalice is the first band without a label to achieve one million downloads of a song from its own servers, direct-from-artist. “It’s 4:20 Somewhere” has been downloaded over 4.6 million times".

== Antitrust enforcement policy ==
McNamee has expressed his support for tougher antitrust enforcement policies in the US and internationally, particularly as it relates to leading technology firms, supporting the antitrust enforcement actions by the DOJ and the FTC led by Lina Khan under President Biden’s administration which has taken a tougher stance on blocking anticompetitive mergers.

== Relationship with Wikipedia ==
According to The New York Times, McNamee has been instrumental in arranging at least two $500,000 donations to the Wikimedia Foundation. Roger McNamee is a member of the Wikipedia Foundation's advisory board.

== Influence ==
Bill Gates wrote in his book The Road Ahead: "Roger was a great sounding board for many of the ideas I wrote about". Mark Zuckerberg (who met McNamee in summer 2006 at a time when Facebook reportedly had buyout offers of around $750 million) said McNamee was "emphatic" that Facebook not be sold; Zuckerberg stated he "clearly cared about building something long-term and about the impact of the things we build as opposed to just making money in the short term," advice that Portfolio.com called "prescient": in October 2007, Facebook sold just 1.6 percent of the company to Microsoft for $240 million. McNamee himself confirmed that.

In the autumn of 2017 McNamee met with US legislators who were preparing to investigate Russian meddling in the 2016 US elections. McNamee had prepared for them a curriculum, stating that the real problem was the divisions social media platforms were creating among Americans, of which Adam Schiff, member of the House Intelligence Committee said, "Roger was really ahead of the curve. Time has borne out his warnings."

== Haight Street Art Center ==
McNamee has been heavily involved in the creation of the Haight Street Art Center which celebrates San Francisco's tradition of music-related poster art. He donated $1 million to help fund the center, and has committed an additional $1 million to help keep it operating.

== Criticism of Facebook ==
An early investor in Facebook, McNamee became very critical of its impact on society and democracy, as expressed in his op-eds for USA Today and The Guardian. Earlier, on CNBC, he said that he had tried to warn Facebook about the impact of Russian meddling in the 2016 U.S. elections. He has also been interviewed by NPR on the topic. As part of this effort, McNamee joined the Center for Humane Technology as a founding advisor. In May 2019, he appeared before the House of Commons privacy and ethics committee in Ottawa, calling for governments to temporarily shut down Facebook and other social media sites until they reform. On 25 September 2020, McNamee was named as one of the 25 members of the "Real Facebook Oversight Board", an independent monitoring group over Facebook.

== The Social Reckoning ==
In 2026, McNamee served as an executive producer on the biographical drama film The Social Reckoning written and directed by Aaron Sorkin. The film is a companion piece to The Social Network (2010) that dramatizes the 2021 Facebook whistleblower events involving Frances Haugen and reported by Jeff Horwitz of The Wall Street Journal.

McNamee's 2019 book Zucked: Waking Up to the Facebook Catastrophe is credited among the film's source materials. Sorkin said he consulted McNamee extensively while writing the screen play.

The film includes a character named Charlie Garrigan, portrayed by Bill Burr. The character is a fictionalized version inspired by McNamee - depicted as a former early Facebook investor and advisor who later became critical of the company's direction and counsels Mark Zuckerberg ahead of congressional testimony. According to Sorkin, McNamee was willing to be portrayed under his own name, but the character was fictionalized due to potential legal concerns over depicting private conversation with Zuckerberg.

== Publications ==
McNamee wrote the book, Zucked: Waking Up to the Facebook Catastrophe, published by Penguin Press February 5, 2019, which was listed as a New York Times Best Seller February 24, 2019.

== Personal life ==
McNamee has been married to the musical theorist and singer/songwriter Ann McNamee since 1983. The couple founded an elephant sanctuary in Tehama County, northern California, now known as Tembo Preserve.
