= Barry Sless =

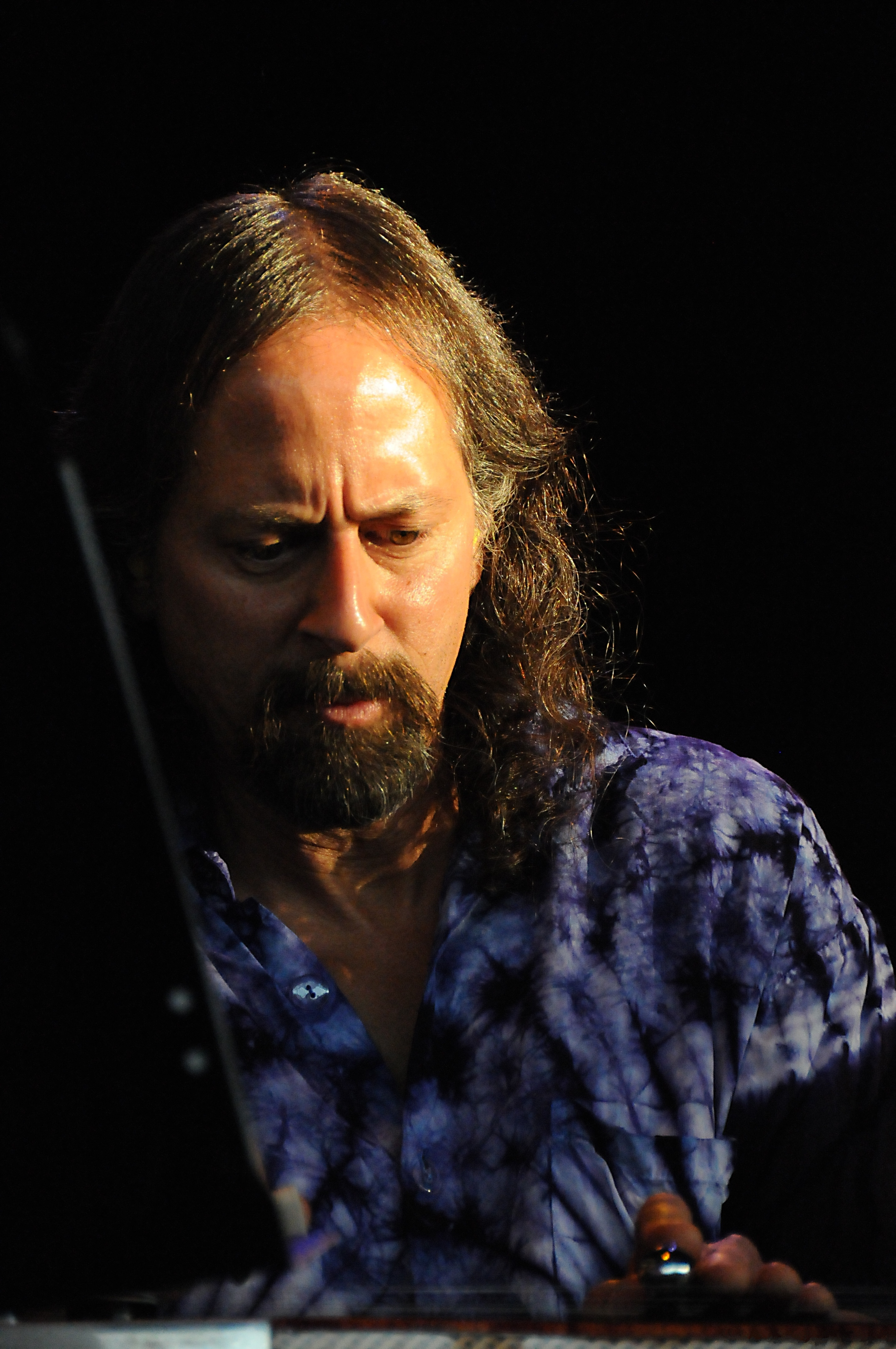
- Sless with Phil Lesh and Friends, 2008

Background information
- Born: December 22, 1955 (age 70)
- Genres: Rock & roll, Rockabilly, Blues, American roots music, Western Swing, R&B
- Occupation: Musician
- Instruments: guitar, Pedal steel guitar, Bass

Barry Sless (born December 22, 1955) is an American musician from Baltimore, Maryland. He plays both traditional six-string guitar and the pedal steel guitar.

== Career ==
=== 2020s ===
In March 2022, Sless was set to head out on the road with the group, Wolf Bros led by Bob Weir formerly with the Grateful Dead.

== Performances with ==
- Section 8
- David Nelson Band
- Phil and Friends
- Moonalice
- Kingfish
- Great American Taxi
- Rowan Brothers
- The Avalon Allstars
- Flying Other Brothers
- Cowboy Jazz
- The Chazz Cats
- Honeysuckle Rogues
- Barry and the Grissettes
- Chris Robinson Brotherhood
- Greenleaf Rustlers
- Skeleton Krewe
- Bobby Weir & Wolf Bros
