= Haight Street Art Center =

Non-profit art space in San Francisco, United States

- Founded: July 1, 2017; 8 years ago
- Headquarters: 215 Haight St, San Francisco, CA 94102
- Website: haightstreetart.org

Haight Street Art Center (HSAC) is a non-profit art space that focuses on poster and printmaking community located in San Francisco, California. They provide education regarding poster art with a printmaking studio, as well as exhibits for artists in the gallery space. They have hosted printmaking pop-ups at offsite locations, including the California Academy of Sciences, Outside Lands, the National AIDS Memorial Grove, and Amoeba Records. Additionally, they collaborate with local artists. In 2023, they worked with mural artist Oscar Lopez to bring awareness to food justice issues and climate in California.

Haight Street Art Center opened on July 1, 2017, in the Lower Haight neighborhood of San Francisco. The building was originally part of San Francisco State Teachers' College and later housed the San Francisco campus of UC Berkeley Extension. The center now houses the "Bronze Bunny" sculpture by Jeremy Fish.
