= 4 Non Blondes =

American rock band

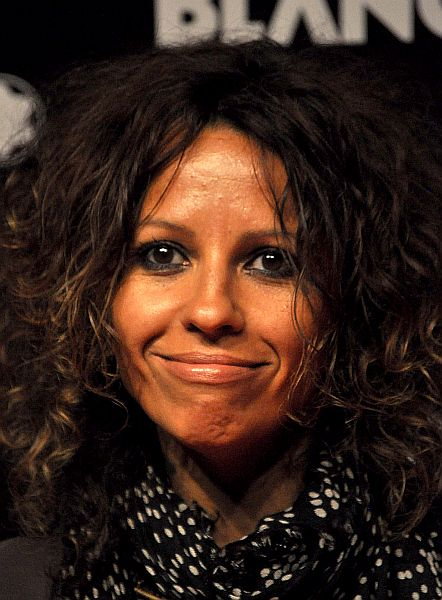
- 4 Non Blondes' lead singer, Linda Perry, in 2010

Background information
- Origin: San Francisco, California, U.S.
- Genre: Alternative rock
- Years active: 1989–1994; 2014; 2025–present
- Labels: Interscope; Atlantic; Kill Rock Stars
- Members: Christa Hillhouse; Linda Perry; Dawn Richardson; Roger Rocha
- Past members: Wanda Day; Shaunna Hall
- Website: 4nonblondes.net

4 Non Blondes is an American rock band formed in San Francisco in 1989. Their lineup comprises Linda Perry (guitars, vocals), Christa Hillhouse (bass), Dawn Richardson (drums) and Roger Rocha (guitar); founding members Shaunna Hall (guitar) and Wanda Day (drums) were previously in the band.

4 Non Blondes's debut album, Bigger, Better, Faster, More! (1992), spent 59 weeks on the US Billboard 200 and sold over six million copies worldwide. Its single "What's Up?" reached number 14 on the US Billboard Hot 100 and topped twelve international charts, becoming the band's signature song. Perry left the band in 1994, and the remaining members disbanded shortly afterward. They reformed for a one-off gig in 2014, and announced a long-term reunion with new shows and music in 2025.

== History ==
=== Formation ===
Bassist Christa Hillhouse and guitarist Shaunna Hall had been roommates and met drummer Wanda Day when they joined a band she was playing in. When the three left that band, they started playing as a trio, but after seeing Linda Perry sing at a solo performance, Hillhouse and Hall asked her to join as vocalist. According to Perry, she and Hall were at Nightbreak, a San Francisco club, and when it was mentioned the trio was looking for a vocalist, Perry announced she was a singer, to which Hall replied, "I know". Their first rehearsal was supposed to be at 6:10 pm on October 17, 1989, but shortly after 5:00 pm the Loma Prieta earthquake hit the San Francisco area.

The name of the band came from an experience the group had in the Bay Area with a blonde family. According to Christa Hillhouse, "Right next to us, there's a trash receptacle with a piece of pizza on top and the kid wanted to pick it up. The mom said, 'No, it's probably dirty, what with the pigeons and people.' And she stared right at us. We were Non Blondes." They said the experience became a symbol that they did not fit the California stereotype. They got their start in the San Francisco bar scene, especially lesbian bars, gaining a significant lesbian following.

=== Bigger, Better, Faster, More! ===
In July 1991, the band was signed to Interscope following a performance at the Gavin Convention, where they opened for Primus on Valentine's Day of the same year. As they began pre-production for their debut album, Day was fired and replaced by Dawn Richardson. In 1992, while recording Bigger, Better, Faster, More! the album's producer, David Tickle, felt that Hall's guitar playing was "not happening" so she was let go from the band as well. Guitarist Louis Metoyer finished the record. The album and its song "What's Up?" was released as the album's second single in 1993. It was successful in the United States and in several European countries, peaking at number one in Ireland, Austria, Germany, and Sweden.

Roger Rocha joined after the completion of the album and stayed with the band until early 1994, when he was fired due to personal conflicts with the rest of the band. With Concrete Blonde being on hiatus, 4 Non Blondes enlisted their guitarist James Mankey, who recorded with them a cover of Van Halen's "I'm the One" on the soundtrack for Airheads and took part in a European tour and some dates in USA and Mexico. Openly lesbian lead singer Perry often performed with a prominent "dyke" sticker affixed to her guitar, including at the Billboard Music Awards in 1993 and on Late Night with David Letterman.

4 Non Blondes contributed the song "Mary's House" to the film Wayne's World 2 in 1993. They also contributed "Bless the Beasts and Children" to a 1994 The Carpenters tribute album If I Were a Carpenter, and "Misty Mountain Hop" to the 1995 Encomium tribute album to Led Zeppelin.

=== Breakup ===
The group disbanded in late 1994 during the recording of their second album. Perry has said that she had been unhappy with Bigger, Better, Faster, More! Perry was an out lesbian, but band members Hillhouse and Richardson were less comfortable being as open about their sexuality in the early 1990s; this provided some tension to the group.

Perry went solo in 1995. She has released solo work, and produced and written songs on albums by Christina Aguilera, Alicia Keys, Pink, Gwen Stefani, Courtney Love, and Kelly Osbourne. Hall has recorded, produced, composed for, and performed with various artists, including vocalist Storm Large (1999–2001), guitarist Eric McFadden (1995–2001), and funk pioneer George Clinton and Parliament Funkadelic.

After leaving the Non Blondes in 1991, Day continued drumming with Malibu Barbi, and then Bad Dog Play Dead. In late 1992, an accident crushed her legs and broke her back; this made drumming very painful. Day moved out of San Francisco in 1995; she spent some time in Arizona before eventually going back to Salt Lake City. Day died on July 10, 1997, and is buried in Tropic, Utah.

=== Reunion and new studio album ===
Hillhouse maintains the official website for 4 Non Blondes. Perry and Hillhouse reunited in 1999 in support of Perry's solo tour.

On May 11, 2014, 4 Non Blondes reunited to perform a concert at a fundraiser entitled "An Evening For Women: Celebrating Arts, Music and Equality" which was held at the Beverly Hilton in Los Angeles. Perry produces the annual event for the L.A. Gay & Lesbian Center to raise money for the center. According to Perry, "the majority of the money goes to the youth center program, which is basically kids that get thrown out on the street by their own parents for being gay." The six songs on the track list were "Train", "Spaceman", "The Ladder", "Mighty Lady", "Superfly", and "What's Up?", and the fundraiser was organized by the Los Angeles LGBT Center.

Dolly Parton and Linda Perry did a cover of the band's song "What's Up?" in 2023. In January 2025, a reunion at BottleRock Napa Valley was announced, as well as further dates and confirmation of the existence of an upcoming studio album. In May 2026, it was announced that their upcoming sophomore studio album, 1994, would be released in 2027. On the album's title, Perry explained, "It sounds like we wrote and recorded it in 1994... So that's what I'm calling the record, 1994."

== Band members ==
Current lineup

- Linda Perry – lead vocals, rhythm guitar (1989–1994, 2014, 2025–present)
- Christa Hillhouse – bass, backing vocals (1989–1994, 2014, 2025–present)
- Dawn Richardson – drums (1991–1994, 2014, 2025–present)
- Roger Rocha – lead guitar, backing vocals (1992–1994, 2014, 2025–present)

Former members

- Shaunna Hall – lead guitar (1989–1992)
- Wanda Day – drums (1989–1991; died 1997)

Session/touring members

- Louis Metoyer – lead guitar (1992)
- James Mankey – lead guitar (1994)
- Nick Maybury - rhythm guitar (2025–present)

== Discography ==
=== Studio albums ===
List of studio albums, with selected chart positions
Title	Album details	Peak chart positions										Certifications
Title	Album details	US	AUS	AUT	GER	NLD	NZ	NOR	SWE	SWI	UK	Certifications
Bigger, Better, Faster, More!	Released: October 13, 1992; Label: Interscope	13	4	1	1	1	1	10	1	1	4	RIAA: Platinum; ARIA: Gold; BPI: Gold; BVMI: 3× Gold; GLF: Gold; IFPI AUT: 2× Platinum; NVPI: Gold

=== Live album ===
- Hello Mr. President (Live in Italy 1993) (1994)

=== Singles ===
List of singles, with selected chart positions
Title	Year	Peak chart positions										Certifications	Album
Title	Year	US	AUS	AUT	GER	NLD	NZ	NOR	SWE	SWI	UK	Certifications	Album
"Dear Mr. President"	1992	—	—	—	—	—	40	—	—	—	—		Bigger, Better, Faster, More!
"What's Up?"	1993	14	2	1	1	1	2	1	1	1	2	RIAA: Gold; ARIA: Platinum; BPI: 2× Platinum; BVMI: 2× Platinum; GLF: Gold; IFPI AUT: Platinum; NVPI: Platinum; RMNZ: Platinum	Bigger, Better, Faster, More!
"Spaceman"	1993	—	85	19	28	25	23	—	—	18	53		Bigger, Better, Faster, More!
"Superfly"	1994	—	—	—	—	—	—	—	—	—	—		Bigger, Better, Faster, More!
"Misty Mountain Hop"	1995	—	78	—	—	—	—	—	—	—	—		Encomium
"—" denotes a recording that did not chart or was not released in that territory.

=== Other appearances ===
List of guest appearances, showing year released and album name
Title	Year	Album
"Mary's House"	1993	Wayne's World II
"Bless the Beasts and Children"	1994	If I Were a Carpenter
"I'm the One"	1994	Airheads

=== Music videos ===
- 1992 – "Dear Mr. President"
- 1993 – "What's Up?"
- 1993 – "Spaceman"
- 1994 – "Superfly"
- 1995 – "Misty Mountain Hop"
- 1996 – "4 Non Blondes vs BBC"

== Awards and nominations ==
Year	Awards	Nominee(s)	Category	Result	Ref.
1993	Denmark GAFFA Awards	Themselves	Best New Act	Nominated	
1993	Denmark GAFFA Awards	Themselves	Most Overrated	Nominated	
1993	MTV Video Music Awards	"What's Up"	Best Alternative Video	Nominated	
1993	Žebřík Music Awards	"What's Up"	Best International Song	Nominated	
1993	Žebřík Music Awards	Themselves	Best International Breakthrough	Nominated	
1994	Danish Music Awards	"What's Up"	Best International Hit	Won	
1994	Brit Awards	Themselves	International Breakthrough Act	Nominated	
2026	American Music Awards	"What's Up"	Best Throwback Song	Nominated	

== See also ==
- List of bands from the San Francisco Bay Area
