= Chubby Checker discography =

- Studio albums: 17
- EPs: 6
- Soundtrack albums: 1
- Live albums: 1
- Compilation albums: 10
- Singles: 54

This is the discography of American rock and roll singer Chubby Checker.

== Albums ==
=== Studio albums ===
Title	Album details	Peak chart positions	
Title	Album details	US	UK
Twist with Chubby Checker	Released: September 1960; Label: Parkway; Formats: LP	3	13
For Twisters Only	Released: December 1960; Label: Parkway; Formats: LP	8	17
It's Pony Time	Released: March 1961; Label: Parkway; Formats: LP	110	—
Let's Twist Again	Released: August 1961; Label: Parkway; Formats: LP	11	—
Bobby Rydell/Chubby Checker (with Bobby Rydell)	Released: November 1961; Label: Cameo; Formats: LP	7	—
Twistin' Round the World	Released: February 1962; Label: Parkway; Formats: LP	54	—
For 'Teen Twisters Only	Released: February 1962; Label: Parkway; Formats: LP	17	—
Down to Earth (with Dee Dee Sharp)	Released: October 1962; Label: Cameo; Formats: LP	117	—
Limbo Party	Released: November 1962; Label: Parkway; Formats: LP	11	—
Let's Limbo Some More	Released: March 1963; Label: Parkway; Formats: LP	87	—
Beach Party	Released: July 1963; Label: Parkway; Formats: LP	90	—
Chubby's Folk Album	Released: December 1963; Label: Parkway; Formats: LP	—	—
Chubby Checker with Sy Oliver and His Orchestra (with Sy Oliver and His Orchestra)	Released: July 1964; Label: Parkway; Formats: LP	—	—
Chequered!	Released: July 1971; Label: London; Formats: LP; Not released in the US until 1982 under the title New Revelation	—	—
The Change Has Come	Released: February 1982; Label: MCA; Formats: LP, MC	186	—
The Texas Twist	Released: July 1994; Label: TEEC Recording Comapny; Formats: CD	—	—
Towards the Light	Released: December 2001; Label: TEEC Recording Comapny; Formats: CD	—	—
"—" denotes releases that did not chart or were not released in that territory.

=== Live albums ===
Title	Album details	Peak chart positions
Title	Album details	US
Chubby Checker in Person	Released: September 1963; Label: Parkway; Formats: LP	104

=== Soundtrack albums ===
Title	Album details	Peak chart positions
Title	Album details	US
Don't Knock the Twist (with the Dovells, the Carroll Brothers and Dee Dee Sharp)	Released: May 1962; Label: Parkway; Formats: LP	29

=== Compilation albums ===
Title	Album details	Peak chart positions
Title	Album details	US
Your Twist Party (With the King of Twist)	Released: November 1961; Label: Parkway; Formats: LP	2
All the Hits (For Your Dancin' Party)	Released: October 1962; Label: Parkway; Formats: LP	23
Chubby Checker's Biggest Hits	Released: November 1962; Label: Parkway; Formats: LP	27
The Chubby Checker Discotheque	Released: December 1964; Label: Parkway; Formats: 2×LP	—
Chubby Checker's Greatest Hits	Released: December 1972; Label: Parkway; Formats: 2×LP, LP, MC, 8-track	152
The Best of Chubby Checker (Cameo Parkway 1959–1963)	Released: October 2005; Label: ABKCO; Formats: CD	—
The Very Best of Chubby Checker	Released: May 22, 2012; Label: ABKCO; Formats: CD	—
The Essential Recordings	Released: January 26, 2015; Label: Primo; Formats: 2×CD	—
Twistin' USA: The Singles As & Bs 1959–1968	Released: January 10, 2020; Label: Jasmine; Formats: CD	—
Dancin' Party – The Chubby Checker Collection: 1960–1966	Released: September 25, 2020; Label: ABKCO/Cameo Parkway; Formats: CD, LP	—
"—" denotes releases that did not chart or were not released in that territory.

== EPs ==
Title	EP details	Peak chart positions
Title	EP details	UK
The Ray Charles-Ton	Released: May 1961; Label: Parkway; Formats: 7"	—
King of the Twist	Released: March 1962; Label: Columbia; Formats: 7"	3
Chubby Checker's Dancin' Party	Released: October 19, 1962; Label: Cameo-Parkway; Formats: 7"	17
Checker and Rydell in London	Released: February 1964; Label: Parlophone; Formats: 7"	—
4 from Chubby	Released: June 1981; Label: PVK; Formats: 7"	—
Doin' the Zombie	Released: September 1997; Label: Bare Bones; Formats: CD	—
"—" denotes releases that did not chart or were not released in that territory.

== Singles ==
Titles (A-side, B-side) Both sides from same album except where indicated	Year	Peak chart positions										Album
Titles (A-side, B-side) Both sides from same album except where indicated	Year	US	US R&B	AUS	BEL	CAN	GER	IRE	NZ	NL	UK	Album
"The Class" b/w "Schooldays, Oh, Schooldays"	1959	38	—	—	—	—	—	—	—	—	—	Non-album singles
"Whole Lotta Laughin'" b/w "Samson and Delilah"	1959	—	—	—	—	—	—	—	—	—	—	Non-album singles
"Dancing Dinosaur" b/w "Those Private Eyes (Are Watching Me)"	1960	—	—	—	—	—	—	—	—	—	—	Non-album singles
"The Twist" b/w "Toot" (non-album track)	1960	1	2	20	—	2	—	—	—	—	44	Twist with Chubby Checker
"The Hucklebuck" b/w "Whole Lotta Shakin' Goin' On" (from For Twisters Only)	1960	14; 42	15	24	—	2	—	—	—	—	—	Twist with Chubby Checker
"Pony Time" b/w "Oh, Susannah" (non-album track)	1961	1	1	8	—	5	—	—	—	—	27	It's Pony Time
"Dance the Mess Around" b/w "Good, Good Lovin'"	1961	24; 43	—	48	—	16	—	—	—	—	—	Non-album single
"Let's Twist Again" b/w "Everything's Gonna' Be All Right" (non-album track)	1961	8	26	7	1	2	12	2	2	1	2	Let's Twist Again
"The Fly" b/w "That's the Way It Goes" (non-album track)	1961	7	11	35	5	5	—	—	—	—	—	For 'Teen Twisters Only
"The Twist" (reissue) b/w "Twistin' U.S.A."	1961	1; 68	4	3; 41	14	1	12	—	1	6	14	Twist with Chubby Checker
"Jingle Bell Rock" b/w "Jingle Bell Rock Imitations" Both sides with Bobby Rydell	1961	21	—	—	—	—	—	—	—	—	—	Bobby Rydell/Chubby Checker
"Slow Twistin'" (with Dee Dee Sharp) b/w "La Paloma Twist" (from Twistin' Round the World)	1962	3; 72	3	9	— 8	18	45	—	2	—	23	For 'Teen Twisters Only
"The Jet" (Continental Europe release) b/w "Dance-A-Long"	1962	—	—	—	16	—	—	—	—	—	—	Let's Twist Again
"Teach Me to Twist" b/w "Swingin' Together" Both sides with Bobby Rydell	1962	109	—	49	—	—	—	—	—	—	45	Bobby Rydell/Chubby Checker
"Dancin' Party" b/w "Gotta Get Myself Together"	1962	12	—	85	—	19	35	—	—	—	19	Non-album singles
"Popeye the Hitchhiker" b/w "Limbo Rock" (from Limbo Party)	1962	10; 2	13; 3	8	— 5	7	— 15	— 4	— 1	— 2	— 32	Non-album singles
"Jingle Bell Rock" (reissue) b/w "Jingle Bell Rock Imitations" Both sides with Bobby Rydell	1962	92	—	—	—	—	—	—	—	—	40	Bobby Rydell/Chubby Checker
"Let's Limbo Some More" b/w "Twenty Miles"	1963	20; 15	16; 15	11	—	16; 13	26	—	—	—	—	Let's Limbo Some More
"Mary Ann Limbo" (Continental Europe release) b/w "Man Smart, Woman Smarter"	1963	—	—	—	—	—	41	—	—	—	—	Limbo Party
"Birdland" b/w "Black Cloud" (non-album track)	1963	12; 98	18	33	—	14	—	—	—	—	—	Beach Party
"Twist It Up" b/w "Surf Party"	1963	25; 55	—	—	—	21	44	—	—	—	—	Beach Party
"The Slop" (Continental Europe release) b/w "The Hucklebuck"	1963	—	—	—	—	—	53	—	—	—	—	Twist with Chubby Checker
"What Do Ya Say!" (Europe and Australasia release) b/w "Something to Shout About"	1963	—	—	25	—	—	—	—	—	—	37	Non-album single
"Loddy Lo" b/w "Hooka Tooka"	1963	12; 17	—	17	—	5; 13	22	—	—	8	—	Chubby's Folk Album
"Do You Love Me" (Netherlands and New Zealand release) b/w "One More Time" Both sides with Dee Dee Sharp	1963	—	—	—	—	—	—	—	6	—	—	Down to Earth
"Troola-Troola-Troola-La (Good Old Schwäb'sche Eisenbahn)" (Continental Europe release) b/w "Autobahn-Baby"	1963	—	—	—	—	—	16	—	—	—	—	Non-album single
"Hey, Bobba Needle" b/w "Spread Joy" (non-album track)	1964	23	—	26	1	16	17	—	—	—	—	Chubby's Folk Album
"Rosie" b/w "Lazy Elsie Molly"	1964	116; 40	—	50	— 19	22; 17	36	—	—	—	—	Non-album singles
"She Wants T' Swim" b/w "You Better Believe It Baby"	1964	50	—	98	—	—	—	—	—	—	—	Non-album singles
"Lovely, Lovely (Loverly, Loverly)" b/w "The Weekend's Here"	1964	70	—	—	16	—	—	—	—	3	—	Non-album singles
"Let's Do the Freddie" b/w "(At the) Discotheque"	1965	40	—	—	—	15	—	—	—	—	—	Non-album singles
"Everything's Wrong" b/w "Cu Ma La Be-Stay"	1965	—	—	—	—	—	—	—	—	—	—	Non-album singles
"Baby, Baby, Balla, Balla!!!" (Continental Europe release) b/w "My Little Girl" Both sides with de Maskers	1965	—	—	—	15	—	—	—	—	18	—	Non-album singles
"You Just Don't Know (What You Do to Me)" b/w "Two Hearts Make One Love"	1965	—	—	—	—	—	—	—	—	—	—	Non-album singles
"Hey You! Little Boo-Ga-Loo" b/w "Pussy Cat"	1966	76	—	—	—	63	—	—	—	—	—	Non-album singles
"Looking at Tomorrow" b/w "You Got the Power"	1966	—	—	—	—	—	—	—	—	—	—	Non-album singles
"Karate Monkey" b/w "Her Heart"	1966	—	—	—	—	—	—	—	—	—	—	Non-album singles
"For You, For Me, For You" (Continental Europe and Canada release) b/w "Yes, I Am" Both sides with de Maskers	1969	—	—	—	—	—	—	—	—	—	—	Non-album singles
"Back in the U.S.S.R." b/w "Windy Cream"	1969	82	—	—	—	86	—	—	—	—	—	Non-album singles
"Let's Go Down" (UK release) b/w "Goodbye Victoria"	1971	—	—	—	—	—	—	—	—	—	—	Chequered!
"No Need to Get So Heavy" (Germany release) b/w "Slow Lovin'"	1971	—	—	—	—	—	—	—	—	—	—	Chequered!
"Reggae My Way" b/w "Gypsy"	1973	—	—	64	—	—	—	—	—	—	—	Non-album singles
"She's a Bad Woman" b/w "Happiness Is a Girl Like You"	1974	—	—	—	—	—	—	—	—	—	—	Non-album singles
"Let's Twist Again" (Europe reissues) b/w "The Twist" (from Twist with Chubby Checker)	1975	—	—	—	1	—	16	11	—	3	5	Let's Twist Again
"The Rub" b/w "Move It"	1976	—	—	—	—	—	—	—	—	—	—	Non-album singles
"Don't Put Me on Hold" (South Africa release) b/w "The Way That You Touch Me"	1980	—	—	—	—	—	—	—	—	—	—	Non-album singles
"Running" b/w "Is Tonight the Night" (non-album track)	1982	91	—	—	—	—	—	—	—	—	—	The Change Has Come
"Harder Than Diamond" b/w "Your Love"	1982	104	—	—	—	—	—	—	—	—	—	The Change Has Come
"Burning Up the Night" (Germany release) b/w "T-83"	1983	—	—	—	—	—	—	—	—	—	—	The Change Has Come
"Read You Like a Book" b/w "Read You Like a Book"	1986	—	—	—	—	—	—	—	—	—	—	Non-album single
"The Twist" ("Yo, Twist!" version) b/w "The Twist" (Buffapella) Both sides with the Fat Boys	1988	16	40	28	2	37	1	4	7	4	2	Coming Back Hard Again
"Knock Down the Walls"	2008	—	—	—	—	—	—	—	—	—	—	Non-album singles
"Changes"	2014	—	—	—	—	—	—	—	—	—	—	Non-album singles
"Lookin' for Me"	2016	—	—	—	—	—	—	—	—	—	—	Non-album singles
"—" denotes releases that did not chart or were not released in that territory.
