= Billboard year-end top 50 R&B singles of 1962 =

Billboard Top R&B Records of 1962 is the year-end chart compiled by Billboard magazine ranking the top rhythm and blues singles of 1962.

The year's top R&B single was the instrumental "Soul Twist" by King Curtis.

Motown and its affiliated divisions (Tamla and Gordy) had six singles on the year-end list: "The One Who Really Loves You" by Mary Wells (No. 18); "Playboy" by The Marvelettes (No. 26); "Jamie" by Eddie Holland (No. 27); "You Beat Me to the Punch" by Mary Wells (No. 28); "Do You Love Me" by The Contours (No. 35); and "Beechwood 4-5789" by The Marvelettes (No. 44).

R&B rank	Pop rank	Title	Artist(s)	Label
1	92	"Soul Twist"	King Curtis	Enjoy
2	2	"I Can't Stop Loving You"	Ray Charles	ABC-Paramount
3	38	"Twist and Shout"	The Isley Brothers	Wand
4	NR	"Bring It On Home to Me"	Sam Cooke	RCA Victor
5	NR	"Lost Someone"	James Brown & The Famous Flames	King
6	3	"Mashed Potato Time"	Dee Dee Sharp	Cameo
7	NR	"Any Day Now"	Chuck Jackson	Wand
8	66	"Snap Your Fingers"	Joe Henderson	Todd
9	35	"Party Lights"	Claudine Clark	Chancellor
10	71	"You'll Lose a Good Thing"	Barbara Lynn	Jamie
11	13	"Duke of Earl"	Gene Chandler	Vee Jay
12	23	"Twistin' the Night Away"	Sam Cooke	RCA Victor
13	NR	"Something's Got a Hold on Me"	Etta James	Argo
14	42	"I Know (You Don't Love Me No More)"	Barbara George	AFO
15	10	"Soldier Boy"	The Shirelles	Scepter
16	NR	"I Need Your Lovin'"	Don Gardner & Dee Dee Ford	Fire
17	NR	"Night Train"	James Brown & the Famous Flames	King
18	19	"The One Who Really Loves You"	Mary Wells	Motown
19	9	"The Twist"	Chubby Checker	Parkway
20	NR	"Don't Play That Song (You Lied)"	Ben E. King	Atco
21	34	"Love Letters"	Ketty Lester	Era
22	NR	"Letter Full of Tears"	Gladys Knight & the Pips	Fury
23	53	"Green Onions"	Booker T. & the M.G.'s	Stax
24	7	"The Loco-Motion"	Little Eva	Dimension
25	55	"Sherry"	The Four Seasons	Vee Jay
26	27	"Playboy"	The Marvelettes	Tamla
27	NR	"Jamie"	Eddie Holland	Motown
28	70	"You Beat Me to the Punch"	Mary Wells	Motown
29	24	"The Wah-Watusi"	The Orlons	Cameo
30	NR	"Turn On Your Love Light"	Bobby Bland	Duke
31	NR	"Annie Get Your Yo-Yo"	Little Junior Parker	Duke
32	44	"Baby It's You"	The Shirelles	Scepter
33	17	"Slow Twistin'"	Chubby Checker	Parkway
34	94	"I'm Blue (The Gong-Gong Song)"	The Ikettes	Atco
35	NR	"Do You Love Me"	The Contours	Gordy
36	4	"Roses Are Red (My Love)"	Bobby Vinton	Epic
37	NR	"Cuttin' In"	Johnny "Guitar" Watson	King
38	52	"Having a Party"	Sam Cooke	RCA Victor
39	8	"Let Me In"	The Sensations	Argo
40	11	"Hey! Baby"	Bruce Channel	Smash
41	NR	"I Found a Love"	The Falcons	LuPine
42	NR	"Poor Fool"	Ike & Tina Turner	Sue
43	NR	"Lie to Me"	Brook Benton	Mercury
44	NR	"Beechwood 4-5789"	The Marvelettes	Tamla
45	NR	"Unchain My Heart"	Ray Charles	ABC-Paramount
46	59	"Rinky Dink"	Dave "Baby" Cortez	Chess
47	NR	"Cry to Me"	Solomon Burke	Atlantic
48	32	"Dear Lady Twist"	Gary U.S. Bonds	LeGrand
49	NR	"Ain't That Loving You"	Bobby Bland	Duke
50	18	"It Keeps Right On a-Hurtin'"	Johnny Tillotson	Cadence

== See also ==
- List of Hot R&B Singles number ones of 1962
- Billboard Year-End Hot 100 singles of 1962
- 1962 in music
