= Just... Fabulous Rock 'n' Roll =

2016 studio album by Cliff Richard

Studio album by Cliff Richard
- Released: 11 November 2016 (CD, DD); 25 November 2016 (LP)
- Genre: Rock and roll
- Length: 45:48
- Label: Sony Music
- Producer: Steve Mandile

Cliff Richard chronology
75 at 75 (2015)	Just... Fabulous Rock 'n' Roll (2016)	Stronger Thru the Years (2017)

Singles from Just... Fabulous Rock 'n' Roll
- 1. "Roll Over Beethoven" Released: 30 September 2016; 2. "It's Better to Dream (Christmas mix)" Released: 25 November 2016; 3. "Blue Suede Shoes" Released: 14 January 2017

Just... Fabulous Rock 'n' Roll is a studio album by Cliff Richard, released 11 November 2016. The album was produced by Steve Mandile and recorded at the Blackbird Studio and Steve Mandile Productions.

The album continues the rock 'n' roll theme of his previous 2013 studio album The Fabulous Rock 'n' Roll Songbook. It comprises covers of 15 classic rock 'n' roll songs (2 in a medley format) and one new song, "It's Better to Dream". It features Elvis Presley in duet with Richard in "Blue Suede Shoes", and Peter Frampton is a guest artist on guitar on the John Lee Hooker cover track "Dimples". The lead single from the album is a cover of the Chuck Berry classic "Roll Over Beethoven" and for the 2016 Christmas season, "It's Better to Dream" (Christmas mix) was adapted from the original album version and released as a Christmas single.

The album reached number 4 on the UK Albums Chart and has been certified Gold for sales over 100,000 in the UK. The album reportedly has sales of 138,318 units in the UK.

== Track listing ==
No.	Title	Writer(s)	Original artist	Length
1.	"Blue Suede Shoes" (with Elvis Presley)	Carl Perkins	Carl Perkins; Elvis Presley	2:06
2.	"Butterfly"	Bernie Lowe, Kal Mann	Charlie Gracie; Andy Williams	2:42
3.	"Sweet Little Sixteen"	Chuck Berry	Chuck Berry	3:08
4.	"She's Got It"	John Marascalco, Richard Penniman	Little Richard	3:00
5.	"His Latest Flame"	Doc Pomus, Mort Shuman	Elvis Presley	2:52
6.	"Move It"	Ian Samwell	Cliff Richard & The Drifters	2:55
7.	"You Send Me"	Sam Cooke	Sam Cooke	2:58
8.	"Multiplication"	Bobby Darin	Bobby Darin	2:44
9.	"Roll Over Beethoven"	Chuck Berry	Chuck Berry	2:49
10.	"Dimples" (featuring Peter Frampton)	James Bracken, John Lee Hooker	John Lee Hooker	3:59
11.	"Great Balls of Fire" / "Whole Lotta Shakin' Goin On" (medley)	Otis Blackwell, Jack Hammer / Dave Williams	Jerry Lee Lewis	4:03
12.	"Memphis, Tennessee"	Chuck Berry	Chuck Berry	2:34
13.	"Cathy's Clown"	Don Everly	The Everly Brothers	3:35
14.	"Keep A-Knockin' (but You Can't Come In)"	Richard Penniman	Little Richard	3:21
15.	"It's Better to Dream" (original track)	Andy Childs, Steve Mandile	(new song)	3:02

== Charts and certifications ==
=== Weekly charts ===
Chart (2016)	Peak position
Australian Albums (ARIA)	15
Belgian Albums (Ultratop Flanders)	109
Dutch Albums (Album Top 100)	82
Irish Albums (IRMA)	46
UK Albums (OCC)	4

=== Year-end charts ===
Chart (2016)	Position
UK Albums (OCC)	49

=== Certifications ===
Region	Certification	Certified units/sales
United Kingdom (BPI)	Gold	100,000^{‡}
^{‡} Sales+streaming figures based on certification alone.
