= Bobby's Biggest Hits =

Compilation album by Bobby Rydell
- Released: 1961
- Genre: Rock and roll
- Label: Cameo Records C-1009

Bobby Rydell chronology
Rydell at the Copa (1961)	Bobby's Biggest Hits (1961)	Biggest Hits Volume 2 (1961)

Singles from Bobby's Biggest Hits
- 1. "I Dig Girls" Released: September 1959; 2. "Wild One/Little Bitty Girl" Released: January 1960; 3. "Swingin' School/Ding-A-Ling" Released: April 1960; 4. "Sway/Groovy Tonight" Released: October 1960

Bobby's Biggest Hits is the first compilation album by Bobby Rydell and was released in 1961. It reached No. 12 on the Billboard 200.

== Track listing ==
No.	Title	Writer	Length
1.	"Kissin' Time"	Bernie Lowe, Kal Mann	2:12
2.	"You'll Never Tame Me"	Doc Pomus, Mort Shuman	2:26
3.	"We Got Love"	Bernie Lowe, Kal Mann	2:15
4.	"I Dig Girls"	Doc Pomus, Mort Shuman	2:30
5.	"Wild One"	Bernie Lowe, Dave Appell, Kal Mann	2:18
6.	"Little Bitty Girl"	Clint Ballard Jr., Fred Tobias	2:22
7.	"Swingin' School"	Bernie Lowe, Dave Appell, Kal Mann	2:15
8.	"Ding-A-Ling"	Bernie Lowe, Dave Appell, Kal Mann	2:25
9.	"Volare"	Domenico Modugno, Mitchell Parish	2:23
10.	"I'd Do It Again"	Clint Ballard Jr., Fred Tobias	2:16
11.	"Sway"	Norman Gimbel, Pablo Beltrán Ruiz	2:16
12.	"Groovy Tonight"	Bernie Lowe, Kal Mann	2:08

== Charts ==
Album

Year	Chart	Peak Position
1961	Billboard 200	12

Singles

Year	Single	Chart	Position
1959	"I Dig Girls"	U.S.Billboard	14
1960	"Wild One"	U.S.Billboard	2
1960	"Wild One"	U.S. R&B	10
1960	"Wild One"	UK Singles	7
1960	"Little Bitty Girl"	U.S.Billboard	19
1960	"Swingin' School"	U.S.Billboard	5
1960	"Swingin' School"	UK Singles	44
1960	"Ding-a-Ling"	U.S.Billboard	18
1960	"Sway"	U.S.Billboard	14
1960	"Sway"	UK Singles	12
1960	"Groovy Tonight"	U.S.Billboard	70
