= It's Mashed Potato Time =

Studio album by Dee Dee Sharp
- Released: May 1962
- Genre: Pop; rhythm and blues; soul
- Length: 28:26
- Label: Cameo Records

Dee Dee Sharp chronology
It's Mashed Potato Time (1962)	Songs of Faith (1962)

Singles from It's Mashed Potato Time
- 1. "Mashed Potato Time" Released: 1962; 2. "Gravy (For My Mashed Potatoes)" Released: 1962

It's Mashed Potato Time is the debut album by Dee Dee Sharp. It was released on Cameo Records in May 1962.

== Track listing ==
No.	Title	Writer(s)	Length
1.	"Gravy for My Mashed Potatoes"	Dave Appell, Kal Mann	2:05
2.	"Slow Twistin'"	Jon Sheldon (Kal Mann)	2:30
3.	"Gee"	George Goldner, William Davis	2:15
4.	"Two Loves"	Lewis, Rabkin, Wilson	2:38
5.	"One Hundred Pounds of Clay"	Bob Elgin, Kay Rogers, Luther Dixon	2:15
6.	"Eddie, My Love"	Aaron Collins, Maxwell Davis, Sam Ling	2:25
7.	"Mashed Potato Time"	Kal Mann, Bernie Lowe	2:27
8.	"Dee Dee, Be My Girl"	Eugene Dixon, Jon Sheldon (Kal Mann)	2:18
9.	"I Sold My Heart to the Junkman"	Leon René, Otis René	2:21
10.	"Remember You're Mine"	Bernie Lowe, Kal Mann	2:47
11.	"Hurry On Down"	Nellie Lutcher	1:58
12.	"Splish-Splash"	Bobby Darin, Murray Kaufman	2:27
