= Ding-A-Ling =

Single by Bobby Rydell

from the album Bobby's Biggest Hits
- B-side: "Swingin' School"
- Released: 1960
- Genre: Rock and roll
- Length: 2:25
- Label: Cameo
- Songwriter(s): Kal Mann, Bernie Lowe & Dave Appell

Bobby Rydell singles chronology
"Wild One" / "Little Bitty Girl" (1960)	"Ding-A-Ling" / "Swingin' School" (1960)	"Volare" / "I'd Do It Again" (1960)

"Ding-A-Ling" is a song released by Bobby Rydell in 1960. The song spent 11 weeks on the Billboard Hot 100 chart, peaking at No. 18. Paired with its flip-side, Swingin' School, "Ding-A-Ling" reached No. 1 in Australia and No. 2 on Canada's CHUM Hit Parade, also co-charting with Swingin' School.

== Chart performance ==
Chart (1960)	Peak position
US Billboard Hot 100	18
Canada (CHUM Charts)	2
