= Twenty Miles =

Single by Chubby Checker

from the album Let's Limbo Some More
- A-side: "Let's Limbo Some More"
- Released: February 1963
- Genre: Rock and roll
- Length: 2:15
- Label: Parkway; 862
- Songwriters: Kal Mann, Bernie Lowe

Chubby Checker singles chronology
"Limbo Rock/Popeye the Hitchhiker" (October 1962)	"Twenty Miles" (1963)	"Birdland" (May 1963)

"Twenty Miles" is a song written by Kal Mann and Bernie Lowe and performed by Chubby Checker. In 1963, the track reached No. 15 on both the U.S. R&B and the Billboard Hot 100. It reached #13 in Canada.

It was featured on his 1963 album, Let's Limbo Some More.

The song ranked #98 on Billboard magazine's Top 100 singles of 1963.

== Other Versions ==
- The Tremeloes released a version of the song on their 1963 album, Twist and Shout.
- Dean Ford and The Gaylords released a version of the song as a single in the UK in 1964.
