= Let's Twist Again (album) =

Studio album by Chubby Checker
- Released: August 1961
- Genre: Rock and roll
- Label: Parkway
- Producer: Kal Mann

Chubby Checker chronology
For Twisters Only (1960)	Let's Twist Again (1961)	It's Pony Time (1961)

Singles from Let's Twist Again
- 1. "Let's Twist Again/Everything's Gonna' Be All Right" Released: June 19, 1961

Professional ratings
Review scores
Source	Rating
AllMusic	3/5 stars

Let's Twist Again is the third studio album by Chubby Checker and was released in 1961 by Parkway Records.

== Track listing ==
=== Side A ===
1. "I Could Have Danced All Night" (Alan Jay Lerner, Frederick Loewe)
2. "The Jet" (Kal Mann)
3. "The Continental Walk" (Don Covay, John Berry)
4. "I Almost Lost My Mind" (Ivory Joe Hunter)
5. "Fishin'" (Kal Mann, Dave Appell)
6. "Quarter to Three" (Gene Barge, Frank Guida, Joseph F. Royster, Gary Anderson)

=== Side B ===
1. "Let's Twist Again" (Kal Mann, Dave Appell)
2. "Ballin' the Jack" (Chris Smith, Jim Burris)
3. "Peanut Butter" (Fred Sledge Smith, Cliff Goldsmith)
4. "The Ray Charles-ton" (Bernie Lowe, Kal Mann, Dave Appell)
5. "Takes Two to Tango" (Al Hoffman, Dick Manning)
6. "Dance-A-Long" (Kal Mann, Dave Appell)

== Chart positions ==
Album

Chart (1961)	Peak position
US Billboard 150 Best Selling Monoraul LP's	11

Singles

Year	Single	Chart	Peak position
1961	"Let's Twist Again"	U.S. Pop	8
1961	"Let's Twist Again"	U.S. R&B	26
1961	"Let's Twist Again"	UK Singles Chart	2
