= For 'Teen Twisters Only =

Studio album by Chubby Checker
- Released: 1961
- Genre: Rock and roll
- Label: Parkway
- Producer: Kal Mann

Chubby Checker chronology
It's Pony Time (1961)	For 'Teen Twisters Only (1961)	Limbo Party (1962)

Singles from For 'Teen Twisters Only
- 1. "The Fly/That’s the Way It Goes" Released: September 1961; 2. "Slow Twistin'/La Paloma Twist" Released: February 1962

Professional ratings
Review scores
Source	Rating
AllMusic	3/5 stars

For 'Teen Twisters Only is the fifth album by Chubby Checker and was released in 1961 by Parkway Records.

== Track listing ==
=== Side A ===
1. "The Lose Your Inhibitions Twist" (Dave Appell, Kal Mann)
2. "Peppermint Twist" (Henry Glover, Joey Dee)
3. "Your Lips and Mine" (Dave Appell, Kal Mann)
4. "Slow Twistin'" - featuring Dee Dee Sharp (Jon Sheldon)
5. "The Fly" (John Medora, David White)
6. "Shout" (O'Kelly Isley Jr., Rudolph Isley, Ronald Isley)

=== Side B ===
1. "Twist-A-Long" (Dave Appell, Kal Mann)
2. "Love Is Like a Twist" (Dave Leon, Jon Sheldon)
3. "Runaround Sue" (Dion DiMucci, Ernie Maresca)
4. "Twistin' the Blues" (Ernest Evans)
5. "Dear Lady Twist" (Frank Guida)
6. "Twistin' Bones" (Ernest Evans)

== Chart positions ==
Chart (1961)	Peak position
US Billboard Top LPs	17

Singles

Year	Single	Chart	Peak position
1961	"The Fly"	U.S. Pop	7
1961	"The Fly"	U.S. R&B	11
1962	"Slow Twistin'"	U.S. Pop	3
1962	"Slow Twistin'"	U.S. R&B	3
1962	"Slow Twistin'"	UK Singles Chart	23
