= Fabulous (Charlie Gracie song) =

"Fabulous" is a song first performed by Charlie Gracie in 1957. It is his second and last appearance on the Billboard Top 40 besides the chart-topping "Butterfly". It made it to number 16 on US Billboard chart. The song was popular in the United Kingdom and internationally reaching number 6 on the UK Singles Chart and number 6 in Canada.

The song was written by Harold Land and Cameo-Parkway co-owner Kal Mann, under the pseudonym 'Jon Sheldon'.

== Covers ==
The song has been subject to many covers, including:

- Steve Lawrence - a single release in 1957.
- Paul McCartney - for the album Run Devil Run (1999)
- Cliff Richard - in his tribute album The Fabulous Rock 'n' Roll Songbook (2013)
