= Swingin' School =

Single by Bobby Rydell

from the album Bobby's Biggest Hits
- A-side: "Ding-A-Ling"
- Released: 1960
- Genre: Rock and roll
- Length: 2:15
- Label: Cameo
- Songwriter(s): Kal Mann, Bernie Lowe & Dave Appell

Bobby Rydell singles chronology
| "Wild One" / "Little Bitty Girl" (1960) | "Ding-A-Ling" / "Swingin' School" (1960) | "Volare" / "I'd Do It Again" (1960) |

"Swingin' School" is a song released in 1960 by Bobby Rydell. The song was from the film Because They're Young. "Swingin' School" spent 12 weeks on the Billboard Hot 100 chart, peaking at No. 5, while reaching No. 11 in Flanders, No. 18 in Wallonia, and No. 44 in the UK's Record Retailer chart. Paired with its flip-side, "Ding-A-Ling", "Swingin' School" reached No. 1 in Australia, and No. 2 on Canada's CHUM Hit Parade, co-charting with Ding-A-Ling.

Paul McCartney reportedly credited “Swinging School” as the inspiration behind the Beatles’ “She Loves You” — specifically the lyric “yeah yeah yeah”.

== Chart performance ==
| Chart (1960) | Peak position |
|---|---|
| Flanders | 11 |
| United Kingdom Record Retailer | 44 |
| US Billboard Hot 100 | 5 |
| Wallonia | 18 |
