= Limbo Party =

Studio album by Chubby Checker
- Released: November 1962
- Genre: Latin
- Length: 31:28
- Label: Parkway

Chubby Checker chronology
For 'Teen Twisters Only (1961)	Limbo Party (1962)	Beach Party (1962)

Singles from Limbo Party
- 1. "Limbo Rock/Popeye the Hitchhiker" Released: August 1962

Professional ratings
Review scores
Source	Rating
AllMusic	4/5 stars

Limbo Party is the sixth album by Chubby Checker and was released in 1962 by Parkway Records.

== Track listing ==
=== Side A ===
1. "La La Limbo" (Dave Appell, Kal Mann)
2. "Mary Ann Limbo" (Dave Leon, Jon Sheldon)
3. "Man Smart, Woman Smarter" (Kal Mann)
4. "Baby, Come Back" (Hal Wallis, Kal Mann)
5. "Somebody Bad Stole the Wedding Bell" (David Mann, Bob Hilliard)
6. "The Bossa Nova" (Dave Appell, Kal Mann)

=== Side B ===
1. "Limbo Rock" (Jan Sheldon, Billy Strange)
2. "When the Saints Go Limbo In" (Dave Appell, Kal Mann)
3. "Jamaica Farewell" (Irving Burgie)
4. "Banana Boat Limbo Song" (Jon Sheldon)
5. "Desfinado (Slightly Out of Tune)" (Antônio Carlos Jobim, Newton Mendonça, Jon Hendricks)
6. "La Bamba" (Ritchie Valens)

== Chart positions ==
Chart (1962)	Peak position
US Billboard Top LPs	11

Singles

Year	Single	Chart	Peak position
1962	"Limbo Rock"	U.S. Pop	2
1962	"Limbo Rock"	U.S. R&B	3
1962	"Limbo Rock"	UK Singles Chart	32
