= Ride! =

Single by Dee Dee Sharp

from the album All the Hits (Volume II)
- B-side: "The Night"
- Released: October 1962
- Genre: Soul; bossa nova
- Length: 2:24
- Label: Cameo
- Songwriter(s): Kal Mann, Dave Appell

Dee Dee Sharp singles chronology
"Gravy (For My Mashed Potatoes)" (1962)	"Ride!" (1962)	"Do the Bird" (1963)

"Ride!" is a song written by Kal Mann and Dave Appell and performed by Dee Dee Sharp. It was featured on the 1963 album All the Hits (Volume II). The single sold over one million copies and was awarded a gold disc.

== Background ==
The song begins with Dee Dee Sharp yelling : "Let's Pony Again". The male backup singers repeatedly sing the words: "Get It". This song was meant to rejuvenate Chubby Checker's dance hit song from the previous year "Pony Time" (1961).

== Chart performance ==
"Ride!" reached No. 5 on the Billboard Hot 100 and No. 7 on the U.S. R&B chart in 1962. In Canada it reached No. 15.

== Other versions ==
- The Orlons released a version of the song on their 1963 album All the Hits by The Orlons.
