= Mashed Potato Time =

Single by Dee Dee Sharp

from the album It's Mashed Potato Time
- B-side: "Set My Heart at Ease"
- Released: February 1962
- Recorded: 1962
- Genre: R&B, pop
- Length: 2:27
- Label: Cameo
- Songwriters: Kal Mann, Bernie Lowe
- Producer: Kal Mann

Dee Dee Sharp singles chronology
"Slow Twistin'" (1962)	"Mashed Potato Time" (1962)	"Gravy (For My Mashed Potatoes)" (1962)

"Mashed Potato Time" is a song recorded by American R&B singer Dee Dee Sharp and released in 1962 by Cameo-Parkway Records. Written by Kal Mann and produced by Bernie Lowe, the song was inspired by the Mashed Potato dance craze of the early 1960s. It became Sharp's breakthrough solo hit, reaching No. 2 on the Billboard Hot 100 and topping the Billboard Hot R&B Sides chart. The song sold more than one million copies, earning a gold disc, and was included on her 1962 debut album It's Mashed Potato Time. The success of "Mashed Potato Time" established Sharp as one of the leading teen pop artists of the early 1960s.

== Background ==
The song "Mashed Potato Time" was inspired by the Mashed Potato dance, a dance craze that had been revived in the early 1960s. It was one of several songs at that time that referenced the dance, another being James Brown's "Mashed Potatoes U.S.A." and "Mashed Potatoes (Part 1 & 2)" by Steve Alaimo.

Bernie Lowe, head of Cameo-Parkway Records, had been monitoring the dance's growing popularity after noticing that young dancers were performing it to records such as "Please Mr. Postman," "The Lion Sleeps Tonight", and "Dear Lady Twist." Lowe commissioned songwriter Kal Mann to write a song centered around the dance, with the melody drawing influence from "Please Mr. Postman"; a financial settlement was later reached with the song's composer.

== Recording and release ==
For the recording, Lowe selected Dee Dee Sharp, a Philadelphia teenager who had previously worked as a backing vocalist on Cameo-Parkway recordings, including Chubby Checker's "Slow Twistin'" (1962). Impressed by her vocal performance on that session, Lowe decided to develop Sharp as a solo artist and rush-release Sharp's debut solo single, "Mashed Potato Time", which she recorded later the same day after completing the Checker session.

The song was recorded at Cameo's Locust Street studio in Philadelphia, featuring piano, drums, bass, guitar, tenor saxophone, and backing vocals from the Orlons. The arrangement was written by Dave Appell and followed the style of "Please Mr. Postman."

The record was initially released under the title "The Mashed Potatoes", but after Lowe discovered that another song with the same title had already been issued by another label, the title was changed to "Mashed Potato Time," a phrase that did not appear in the lyrics.

In 1996, the Campbell's featured the song in a $30 million advertising campaign, using a new, more upbeat recording by Sharp.

== Reception ==
In a review, Billboard selected "Mashed Potato Time" as spotlight single of the week writing: "Here's another teen dance undergoing a revival and thrush Dee Dee Sharp sells the catchy tune with spirit over good combo support. Could get action. Flip is 'Set My Heart at Ease.'"

The song reached No. 1 on the Cashbox Top 100 and Billboard R&B charts in 1962, as well as No. 2 on the Billboard Hot 100 chart. It reached number 2 on the New Zealand lever hit parade charts. It was kept from the No. 1 spot by "Soldier Boy" by The Shirelles. Billboard ranked it as the No. 3 song for 1962. It became a gold record. In Canada it was No. 2 for 2 weeks, also due to The Shirelles.

Following the success of the single, Sharp recorded a sequel called "Gravy (For My Mashed Potatoes)" later in 1962.

== Cover versions ==
- Dick and Dee Dee released a version of the song on their 1962 album Tell Me - The Mountain's High.
- The Marvelettes, whose hit "Please Mr. Postman" was mentioned in the lyrics, covered this song on their 1962 album The Marvelettes Sing.
- Dee Dee Ramone, as Dee Dee King, recorded a hip hop version of the song, with new lyrics, on his 1989 album Standing in the Spotlight, with Debbie Harry of Blondie on backing vocals.
- Bobby "Boris" Pickett's "Monster Mash," released a few months after "Mashed Potato Time", was written in part as a parody of Dee Dee Sharp's record, even copying the "whaa-oo" backing vocal.

== Charts ==
=== Weekly charts ===
Weekly chart performance for "Mashed Potato Time"
Chart (1962)	Peak position
US Billboard Hot 100	2
US Hot R&B Sides (Billboard)	1
US Cash Box Top 100	1

=== Year-end charts ===
1962 year-end chart performance for "Mashed Potato Time"
Chart (1962)	Position
US Billboard Hot 100	3
US Top R&B Records (Cash Box)	6

== See also ==
- List of number-one R&B singles of 1962 (U.S.)
