= Loddy Lo =

Single by Chubby Checker

from the album Chubby's Folk Album
- B-side: "Hooka Tooka"
- Released: October 1963
- Genre: Rock and roll
- Length: 2:07
- Label: Parkway; 890
- Songwriters: Kal Mann, Dave Appell
- Producer: Elliot Mazer

Chubby Checker singles chronology
| "Surf Party" (July 1963) | "Loddy Lo" (1963) | "Hey, Bobba Needle" (March 1964) |

"Loddy Lo" is a song written by Kal Mann and Dave Appell and performed by Chubby Checker. In 1963, the track reached No. 4 on the U.S. R&B and No. 12 on the Billboard Hot 100. In Canada the song reached No. 5.

It was featured on his 1963 album, Chubby's Folk Album.

The song was written about Checker's wife Catharina Lodders.

== Other versions ==
- Joe Loss and His Orchestra released a version as a single in 1963.
