= Birdland (Chubby Checker song) =

Single by Chubby Checker

from the album Beach Party
- B-side: "Black Cloud"
- Released: May 1963
- Genre: Rock and roll
- Length: 2:16
- Label: Parkway; 873
- Songwriter(s): Kal Mann, Huey "Piano" Smith

Chubby Checker singles chronology
"Let's Limbo Some More/Twenty Miles" (February 1963)	"Birdland" (1963)	"Twist It Up" (July 1963)

"Birdland" is a song written by Kal Mann and Huey "Piano" Smith and performed by Chubby Checker. In 1963, the track reached No. 12 on the Billboard Hot 100 and No. 18 on the U.S. R&B chart. In Canada "Birdland" and "Black Cloud" co-charted reaching No. 14,

It was featured on his 1963 album, Beach Party.
