= Radio Voice Italia =

Radio Voice Italia (RVI) is a media company, known for Italian US American international internet radio broadcasts and archives. RVI was featured in DELCO NEWS (Delaware County, Pennsylvania, USA). Live and archived internet radio shows, hosted by founder Joe Morinelli and Co-host Executive Producer Dee Loglisci, feature segments on Italian heritage; classic singers like Mario Lanza and Charlie Gracie; “Dee Buzz”, a lifestyle and news program on Italy; and the humanitarian news program “Dope on the Pope” about the Catholic Pope. RVI is also known as Radio Voice Italia USA.

Radio Voice Italia hosted Bill Ronayne, President of the Mario Lanza Institute & Museum, to further preserve the late famed Italian American singer's legacy via audio archives.

In a televised interview on May 3, 2018, in Radnor Studio 21, Philadelphia area Main Line TV (MLTV) Network Host John Ricciutti (Public TV) talked with Joe Morinelli, the founder and host of Radio Voice Italia, about his background in the 1970s broadcast radio and more recent streaming internet radio heard worldwide. Morinelli opined on the future of radio as more internet based and less saddled with capital burdens. He also described his paranormal experience that predicted on live radio when Frank Sinatra would pass away. Host Ricciutti asked Morinelli whether RVI had ever had anyone on the show from The Mob. Morinelli wisely guarded his answer, compelling Ricciutti to say “you’re very secretive”! Equally interesting to music pros is Morinelli's single mention of visiting Broadcast Music, Inc. (BMI) in NYC.

In 2018, Morinelli celebrated 50 years in sound and radio. He is an expert on historical sound equipment. His background includes working as a DJ, a host for a terrestrial broadcast station in Baltimore, and among other roles, he was a cleared advance sound man for President Gerald Ford who spoke at Independence Hall in Philadelphia. The DELCO (Delaware County, PA) Press Club, where Morinelli made an appearance as a radio broadcast panelist in 2018, heard how RVI was streaming international internet radio and in 2020 commencing Simulcast broadcast radio.

In 2021, Radio Voice Italia interviewed George Bochetto, an attorney saving the Columbus Statue in Marconi Plaza, Philadelphia, US. Bochetto, a former Pennsylvania State Boxing Commissioner (1996-2002), declared his primary candidacy in the 2022 United States Senate election in Pennsylvania.
