= Little Bitty Girl =

Single by Bobby Rydell

from the album Bobby's Biggest Hits
- A-side: "Wild One"
- Released: 1960
- Genre: Pop
- Length: 2:22
- Label: Cameo-Parkway
- Songwriter(s): Clint Ballard, Jr. & Fred Tobias

Bobby Rydell singles chronology
"We Got Love" / "I Dig Girls" (1959)	"Wild One" / "Little Bitty Girl" (1960)	"Swingin' School" / "Ding-a-Ling" (1960)

"Little Bitty Girl" is a song released in 1960 by Bobby Rydell. The song spent 15 weeks on the Billboard Hot 100 chart, peaking at No. 19. In Canada, it reached No. 2, co-charting with "Wild One".

== Chart performance ==
Chart (1960)	Peak position
US Billboard Hot 100	19
Can (CHUM Charts)	2
