= Gary Lefkowith =

- Born: Gary Lefkowith; November 18, 1950 (age 75)
- Origin: Reading, Pennsylvania, U.S.
- Genres: Smooth jazz; rock; Top 40; alternative; adult contemporary
- Occupations: Songwriter; producer
- Years active: 1976−present
- Label: Generic Inc./ The Orchard
- Website: lesonictheband.com

Gary Lefkowith is an American songwriter and producer. He has been active in the music industry since 1976 and has a diverse genre profile which includes smooth jazz, rock, top 40, alternative, and adult contemporary music. In 2003, he co-produced a remix for Chubby Checker of "Limbo Rock". It was produced in collaboration with Mike Rogers and credited to The Hill & Hifi.

Lefkowith co-produced and co-wrote Charlie Gracie’s 2012 single “Baby Doll,” which Gracie cites in his auto biography as being a major renaissance for his career. It received airplay on BBC 2 and Sirius XM. The record was Gracie’s first airplay on a new record in 50 years.

With bandmate Mike Rogers, Lefkowith made a significant impact on the smooth jazz scene with their group Le Sonic. The single "Any Moment", featuring guitarist Robert Lee, an original member of ? & The Mysterians, topped the Billboard Smooth Jazz National Airplay chart in February 2022. "I’ll Be The One," featuring Lauran Beluzo and Robert Lee, also reached the top of the same chart in October 2022. It was the first vocal record to be No. 1 on Billboard in many years. Lefkowith's most recent single "Riverside Drive," featuring Jim Hynes and Scott Kreitzer, reached No. 4 on the Billboard Smooth Jazz chart as of 2023.
