= The Class (song) =

Single by Chubby Checker
- B-side: "Schooldays, Oh Schooldays"
- Released: 1959
- Recorded: 1959
- Genre: Novelty
- Label: Cameo-Parkway
- Songwriter(s): Kal Mann

"The Class" is a 1959 novelty song by American rock and roll recording artist Chubby Checker. It peaked at number thirty-eight on the Billboard Hot 100 and was his first entry on the chart. In the song, Checker plays a music teacher who asks his class (Checker doing impressions of various musicians) for their homework, which are variations of "Mary Had a Little Lamb". The musicians imitated are Fats Domino, the Coasters, Elvis Presley, Cozy Cole, and the Chipmunks (who are referred to as Ricky, Frankie, and Fabian).
