= Let's Limbo Some More =

Single by Chubby Checker

from the album Let's Limbo Some More
- B-side: "Twenty Miles"
- Released: February 1963
- Genre: Rock and roll
- Length: 2:12
- Label: Parkway; 862
- Songwriter(s): Kal Mann, Dave Appell

Chubby Checker singles chronology
"Limbo Rock/Popeye the Hitchhiker" (1962)	"Let's Limbo Some More" (1963)	"Birdland" (1963)

"Let's Limbo Some More" is a song written by Kal Mann and Dave Appell and performed by Chubby Checker. In 1963, the track reached No. 16 on the U.S. R&B and No. 20 on the Billboard Hot 100. It reached #16 in Canada.

It was featured on his 1963 album, Let's Limbo Some More.
