= Hooka Tooka =

Single by Chubby Checker

from the album Chubby's Folk Album
- A-side: "Loddy Lo"
- Released: October 1963
- Genre: Rock and roll
- Length: 2:10
- Label: Parkway; 890
- Songwriter(s): Chubby Checker, Elliot Mazer
- Producer(s): Elliot Mazer

Chubby Checker singles chronology
"Surf Party" (July 1963)	"Hooka Tooka" (1963)	"Hey, Bobba Needle" (March 1964)

"Hooka Tooka" is a song written by Chubby Checker and Elliot Mazer and performed by Chubby Checker. In 1963, the track reached No. 17 on the Billboard Hot 100 and No. 20 on the U.S. R&B. In Canada it reached No. 13.

It was featured on his 1963 album, Chubby's Folk Album.

== Other Versions ==
- Peter Duchin, His Piano and Orchestra released a version of the song on their 1964 album, The Peter Duchin Discotheque Dance Party.
- The Chambers Brothers performed the song live, arranged by Joe and Willie Chambers. It was included on their People Get Ready album released on Vault 9003 in 1966.
