= Dancin' Party =

Single by Chubby Checker

from the album Chubby Checker's Biggest Hits
- B-side: "Gotta Get Myself Together"
- Released: June 1962
- Genre: Rock and roll
- Length: 2:05
- Label: Parkway; 842
- Songwriters: Kal Mann, Dave Appell

Chubby Checker singles chronology
"Teach Me to Twist" (1962)	"Dancin' Party" (1962)	"Limbo Rock/Popeye the Hitchhiker" (1962)

"Dancin' Party" is a song written by Kal Mann and Dave Appell and performed by Chubby Checker. In 1962, the track reached No. 12 on the Billboard Hot 100 and No. 19 on the Canadian and UK Singles Charts.

It was featured on his 1963 compilation album, Chubby Checker's Biggest Hits.

In 1963, Gary U.S. Bonds filed a $100,000 lawsuit against Checker, claiming that Checker stole "Quarter to Three" and turned it into "Dancin' Party." The lawsuit was later settled out of court.

== Other versions ==
- Claudine Clark released a version on her 1962 album, Party Lights.
- Showaddywaddy released a version as a single in 1977 which reached No. 4 on the UK Singles Chart.
