= The Fabulous Rock 'n' Roll Songbook =

2013 studio album by Cliff Richard

Studio album by Cliff Richard
- Released: 11 November 2013
- Recorded: 2013
- Length: 42:20
- Labels: Rhino UK; Warner Music UK
- Producers: Steve Mandile, Eddie Healey (exec.)

Cliff Richard chronology
Soulicious (2011)	The Fabulous Rock 'n' Roll Songbook (2013)	75 at 75 (2015)

Singles from The Fabulous Rock 'n' Roll Songbook
- 1. "Rip It Up" Released: 2013

The Fabulous Rock 'n' Roll Songbook is a studio album by Cliff Richard. Promoted as his 100th album, the album was released through the Warner Music imprint Rhino Records on 11 November 2013 and is made up of 14 covers of classic rock 'n' roll songs and one new song "One More Sunny Day".

The album reached number 7 in the UK Albums Chart and was certified gold for sales over 100,000 in the UK.

The album was recorded live at the Blackbird Studio and at The Parlor in Nashville, Tennessee, as a tribute to the greats of rock 'n' roll who inspired and influenced Cliff, including Elvis Presley, Buddy Holly, Jerry Lee Lewis, Chuck Berry, The Everly Brothers and Little Richard. The album is produced by Steve Mandile and Eddie Healy is the executive producer.

The debut single from the album is a cover of the hit "Rip It Up", recorded by Little Richard in 1956 and also that year by Bill Haley and His Comets, it was released as Cliff Richard's 140th single.

In the US, the album was released on 25 February 2014 through Friday Music.

== Track listing ==
No.	Title	Original artist	Length
1.	"Rip It Up"	Little Richard (recorded 1956); Bill Haley and his Comets (recorded 1956)	2:58
2.	"Wake Up Little Susie"	The Everly Brothers	2:43
3.	"Poetry in Motion"	Johnny Tillotson (recorded 1961)	3:26
4.	"Sealed with a Kiss"	Brian Hyland (recorded 1962)	2:39
5.	"Stood Up"	Ricky Nelson	2:56
6.	"Such a Night"	The Drifters (recorded 1953); Elvis Presley	2:28
7.	"School Days"	Chuck Berry (recorded 1957)	2:50
8.	"Teddy Bear" / "Too Much" (medley)	Elvis Presley (recorded 1957/1956)	2:43
9.	"Don't Let Go"	Jesse Stone; Roy Hamilton	3:15
10.	"Dream Lover"	Bobby Darin (recorded 1959)	3:17
11.	"Stuck on You"	Elvis Presley	3:05
12.	"Fabulous"	Charlie Gracie (recorded 1957)	2:50
13.	"Rave On"	Buddy Holly (recorded 1958)	2:40
14.	"Johnny B. Goode"	Chuck Berry (recorded 1958)	2:47
15.	"One More Sunny Day" (original track)	Cliff Richard	3:13

== Charts and certifications ==
=== Weekly charts ===
Chart (2013−14)	Peak position
Australian Albums (ARIA)	7
Belgian Albums (Ultratop Flanders)	113
Danish Albums (Hitlisten)	37
Dutch Albums (Album Top 100)	86
Irish Albums (IRMA)	40
Scottish Albums (Official Charts)	12
UK Albums (Official Charts)	7

=== Year-end charts ===
Chart (2013)	Position
United Kingdom (OCC)	82

=== Certifications ===
Region	Certification	Certified units/sales
United Kingdom (BPI)	Gold	100,000^{*}
^{*} Sales figures based on certification alone.
