= Breaking and Entering (song) =

1980 song by Dee Dee Sharp-Gamble

Single by Dee Dee Sharp-Gamble

from the album Dee Dee
- B-side: "I Love You Anyway"
- Released: May 1981
- Recorded: 1980
- Genre: Disco
- Length: 3:18
- Label: Philadelphia Itl.
- Songwriter: L. Hanks - R. Massey
- Producers: Jerry Butler and Paul Wilson

Dee Dee Sharp-Gamble singles chronology
"Easy Money" (1981)	"Breaking and Entering" (1981)	"I Love You Anyway" (1981)

"Breaking and Entering" is a 1980 dance single by Dee Dee Sharp-Gamble.

== Background ==
The single was her first to chart on Billboard's Dance Play chart and marked a return the music charts by Sharp, who had not charted any singles in six years. "Breaking and Entering", along "Easy Money" hit No. 1 on the dance charts for four weeks in the spring of 1981. Although Sharp promoted the single on American Bandstand, it failed to reach either the R&B or pop chart.
