= The Fly (Chubby Checker song) =

Single by Chubby Checker

from the album For 'Teen Twisters Only
- B-side: "That's the Way It Goes"
- Released: September 1961
- Genre: Rock and roll
- Length: 2:27
- Label: Parkway
- Songwriters: John Madara, David White
- Producer: Kal Mann

Chubby Checker singles chronology
"Let's Twist Again" (1961)	"The Fly" (1961)	"Jingle Bell Rock" (1961)

"The Fly" is a song written by John Madara and David White and performed by Chubby Checker. The song was produced by Kal Mann.

== Background ==
This song featured an electric shaver, which made the sound effects of the buzzing fly.

== Chart performance ==
"The Fly" reached #7 on the U.S. pop chart, #11 on the U.S. R&B chart, #5 in Canada, and #35 in Australia in 1961. It was featured on his 1961 album For 'Teen Twisters Only. The song ranked #70 on Billboard magazine's Top 100 singles of 1961.

== Other versions ==
- Brendan Bowyer with The Royal Showband Waterford released a version of the song as a single in 1966, but it did not chart.

== In popular culture ==
- Checker's version was featured in the 1962 film Don't Knock the Twist and was included on the soundtrack.
- Checker's version was featured in the 1988 film Hairspray, however, due to licensing restrictions with Cameo-Parkway Records, was not included on the soundtrack.
- The song was mentioned in the Ernie Mareska song "Shout! Shout! (Knock Yourself Out)" (1962)
- The song is mentioned in The Orlons song "Wah Watusi". (1962)
