= Wild One (Bobby Rydell song) =

Single by Bobby Rydell

from the album Bobby's Biggest Hits
- B-side: "Little Bitty Girl"
- Released: January 18, 1960
- Genre: Rock and roll
- Length: 2:16
- Label: Cameo
- Songwriter(s): Dave Appell, Kal Mann, Bernie Lowe

Bobby Rydell singles chronology
"We Got Love" / "I Dig Girls" (1959)	"Wild One" / "Little Bitty Girl" (1960)	"Swingin' School" / "Ding-A-Ling" (1960)

"Wild One" is a song written by Dave Appell, Kal Mann and Bernie Lowe, and performed by Bobby Rydell. Session drummer Gary Chester played on the recording, which was released as a single in 1960.

== Chart performance ==
The song became a big hit for Rydell, spending 16 weeks on the Billboard Hot 100 peaking at No. 2, and was kept from the No. 1 position by "Theme from A Summer Place" by Percy Faith. The song also peaked at No. 10 on the R&B chart. Outside the US, "Wild One" went to No. 7 in the United Kingdom, No. 11 in Australia, and No. 2 in Canada, co-charting with "Little Bitty Girl".

== Chart performance ==
Chart (1960)	Peak position
US Billboard Hot 100	2
Hot R&B Sides	10
UK - Record Retailer	7
Australia	11
Canada (CHUM Charts)	2
