= Spring Gully, South Carolina =

Unincorporated community in South Carolina, U.S.

Coordinates: 33°23′15″N 79°24′34″W

Spring Gully is an unincorporated community in Georgetown County, in the U.S. state of South Carolina.

Spring Gully sits on U.S. Route 521. It is also approximately 2 miles east of Alternate U.S. Route 17, which leads Spring Gully to cities like Moncks Corner and Summerville.

== History ==
The community descriptively was named for the fact that a spring flowed in a nearby gully.

== Notable person ==
Chubby Checker, a rock and roll singer, was born in Spring Gully in 1941.
