= Slow Twistin' =

Single by Chubby Checker with Dee Dee Sharp

from the album For 'Teen Twisters Only
- B-side: "La Paloma Twist"
- Released: February 1962
- Genre: R&B; rock and roll; soul
- Length: 2:31
- Label: Parkway
- Songwriter: Jon Sheldon

Chubby Checker with Dee Dee Sharp singles chronology
"Twistin' U.S.A." (1962)	"Slow Twistin'" (1962)	"La Paloma Twist" (1962)

"Slow Twistin'" is a song recorded by American singers Chubby Checker and Dee Dee Sharp, released in 1962 by Parkway Records. Written by Kal Mann and Dave Appell, the song was produced by Bernie Lowe and became a hit on the Billboard Hot 100, peaking at No. 3. The recording marked one of Sharp's earliest appearances as a featured vocalist and helped launch her solo career.

== Background ==
Following the success of the Twist dance craze, Chubby Checker remained one of Parkway Records' most successful artists. Jon Sheldon wrote "Slow Twistin'" as a follow-up to Checker's previous dance-oriented hits. During the recording session, Dee Dee Sharp, then going by her birth name Dione LaRue, provided backing vocals.

According to Sharp, Checker noticed her distinctive voice during the session and suggested that Parkway executive Bernie Lowe feature her on the record. Sharp was added as a co-vocalist, transforming "Slow Twistin'" into a duet. The performance became her first major national exposure as a recording artist and led Lowe to sign her as a solo artist for Cameo-Parkway Records.

== Recording and release ==
"Slow Twistin'" was recorded at Parkway Records' studios in Philadelphia and featured Checker and Sharp trading vocals over an upbeat rhythm arrangement typical of early 1960s dance records. The single was released in February 1962 by Parkway Records, with "La Paloma Twist" as the B-side. Sharp is uncredited on the single and early albums.

Another version of Slow Twistin', with lead vocals by Sharp and featuring Checker, and with different lyrics, appeared on Sharp's 1962 debut album It's Mashed Potato Time.

== Reception ==
In a review Billboard magazine wrote: "Here's Chubby again, with another powerful coupling. First up is a breezy, rockin' twister, with an unbilled femme companion who is good. Flip is the old, Latin-based tune, given a smart Twist treatment. Either way here with an edge to the top side."

Charles Schreiber of the Buffalo Evening News wrote: "Now that Chubby's got the nation in a lather, he sets the pace a little slower. Some of the lyrics lead this listener to believe that Chubby wants to prolong his fad as long as possible. The beat is designed for the dance, and will be approved by older dancers and tyros."

== Chart performance ==
The song became a commercial success, reaching No. 3 on the Billboard Hot 100 chart in March 1962. It also reached No. 3 on the Billboard R&B chart, further extending Checker's run of successful dance records. In Canada it reached number 18.

The success of "Slow Twistin'" helped establish Sharp as a recording artist. Shortly afterward, she released her debut solo single, "Mashed Potato Time", which became an even greater success, reaching No. 2 on the Billboard Hot 100.

== Cover versions ==
The song was covered by The Marvelettes (as "Slow Twist") on their 1962 album The Marvelettes Sing (aka Smash Hits of '62).
