= We Got Love (Bobby Rydell song) =

Single by Bobby Rydell

from the album We Got Love
- B-side: "I Dig Girls"
- Released: 1959
- Length: 2:24
- Label: Cameo
- Songwriters: Bernie Lowe, Kal Mann

Bobby Rydell singles chronology
"Kissin' Time" / "You'll Never Tame Me" (1959)	"We Got Love" / "I Dig Girls" (1959)	"Wild One" / "Little Bitty Girl" (1960)

"We Got Love" is a song written by Bernie Lowe and Kal Mann. It was first released as a single by Bobby Rydell in 1959. The song became a hit, spending 17 weeks on the Billboard Hot 100, peaking at No. 6, while reaching No. 4 on the Cash Box Top 100, and No. 5 on Canada's CHUM Hit Parade.

== Other versions ==
- A cover version by Alma Cogan was released in late 1959, and reached No. 26 on the UK's New Musical Express chart.
- A French-language version, titled "Je Compte Sur Toi", was issued by Petula Clark in 1960, and reached No. 36 in Wallonia.
- A Swedish-language version, "Jag är kär" (I'm in love) by Britt Damberg was released in 1960 (Decca SDE 7209).
