= List of Hot R&B Singles number ones of 1962 =

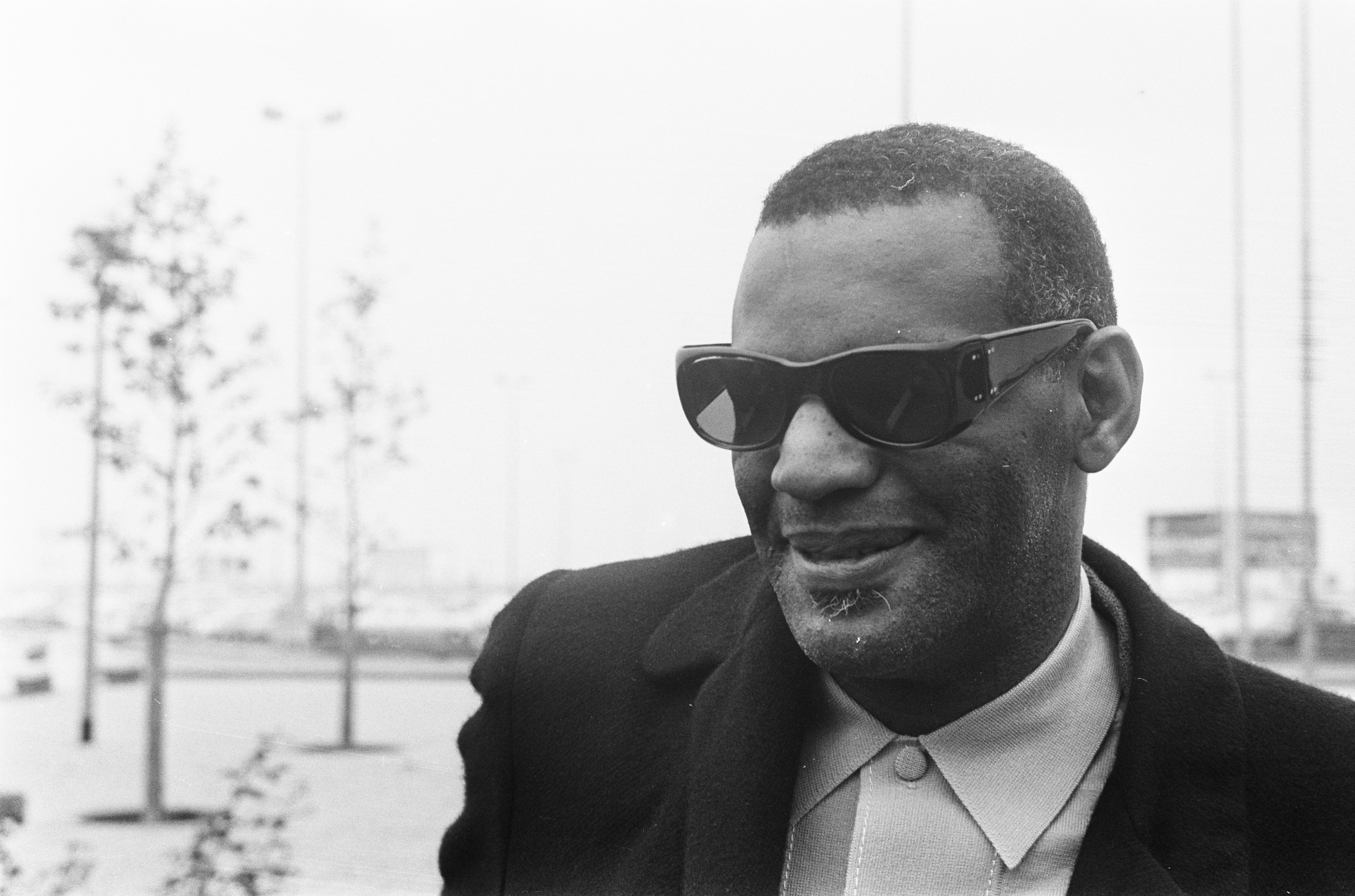
Ray Charles had three number ones in 1962. His recording of "I Can't Stop Loving You" was the year's longest-running chart-topper.

In 1962, Billboard published a chart ranking the top-performing songs in the United States in rhythm and blues (R&B) and related African American-oriented music genres; it was published under the title Hot R&B Sides through the issue of the magazine dated October 27 and Hot R&B Singles thereafter. The chart has undergone various name changes over the decades to reflect the evolution of such genres and since 2005 has been published as Hot R&B/Hip-Hop Songs.

In the issue of Billboard dated January 6, Ray Charles and his orchestra moved up to number one with "Unchain My Heart", which held the top spot for two weeks. Charles would go on to achieve two further chart-toppers later in the year, both taken from his album Modern Sounds in Country and Western Music, which is considered to have been a ground-breaking record. His recording of Don Gibson's 1957 song "I Can't Stop Loving You" spent ten weeks at number one, the year's longest unbroken spell in the top spot. The song was a triple chart-topper, as it also reached number one on the Easy Listening chart as well as the all-genre Hot 100. In December, Charles spent two weeks atop the chart with his version of "You Are My Sunshine", giving him a total of 14 weeks at number one, the most for any act in 1962. The only other act with more than one number one during the year was the 4 Seasons, who topped the chart with both "Sherry" and "Big Girls Don't Cry".

Several of 1962's number ones were associated with dance crazes of the time. In March, Sam Cooke spent three weeks atop the chart with "Twistin' the Night Away", which was followed into the top spot by "Soul Twist" by King Curtis and the Noble Knights, both of which referenced the dance the Twist. The latter song was in turn displaced by "Mashed Potato Time" by Dee Dee Sharp, referring to the dance the Mashed Potato, and later in the year Little Eva spent three weeks at number one with "The Loco-Motion", the lyrics of which described a dance which did not actually exist at the time but which came into being following the song's success. Almost all of the acts to reach number one in 1962 did so for the first time; of the 13 acts to top the chart during the year, only Charles, Cooke and Esther Phillips had achieved a previous R&B number one. Phillips, then known as Little Esther, had reached number one three times in 1950 as a featured vocalist with the Johnny Otis Orchestra, but had not entered the chart at all for more than ten years when her version of "Release Me" charted in late 1962 and quickly rose to number one.

== Chart history ==
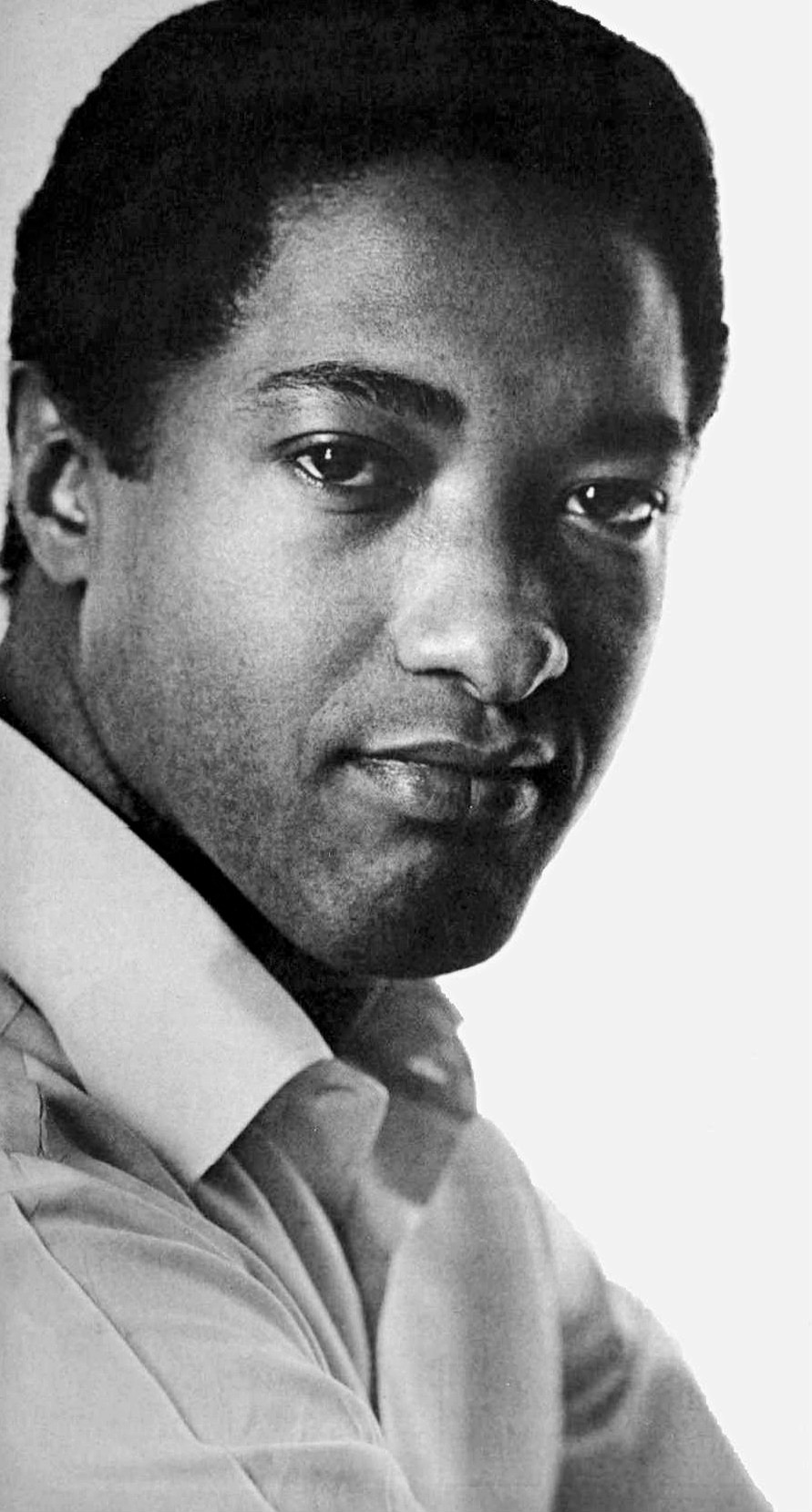
Sam Cooke topped the chart with "Twistin' the Night Away".

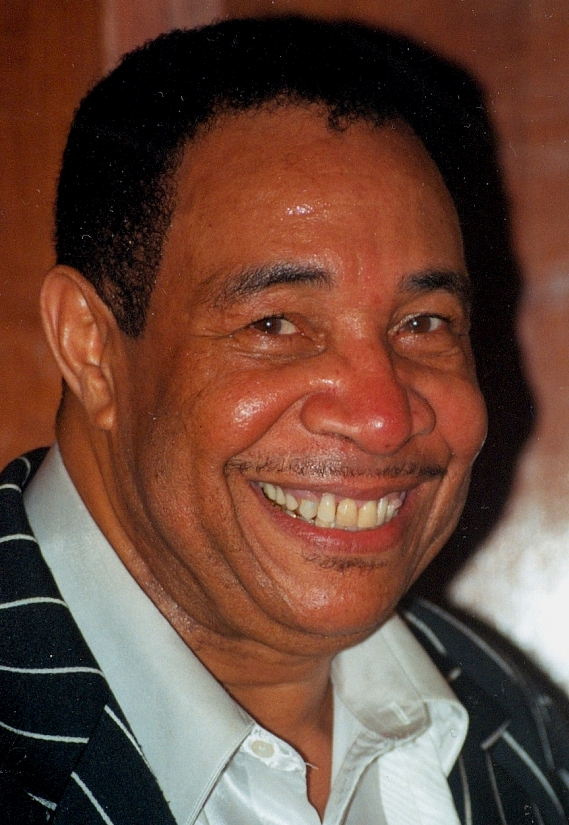
Gene Chandler (pictured in later life) reached number one with his most successful song, "Duke of Earl".

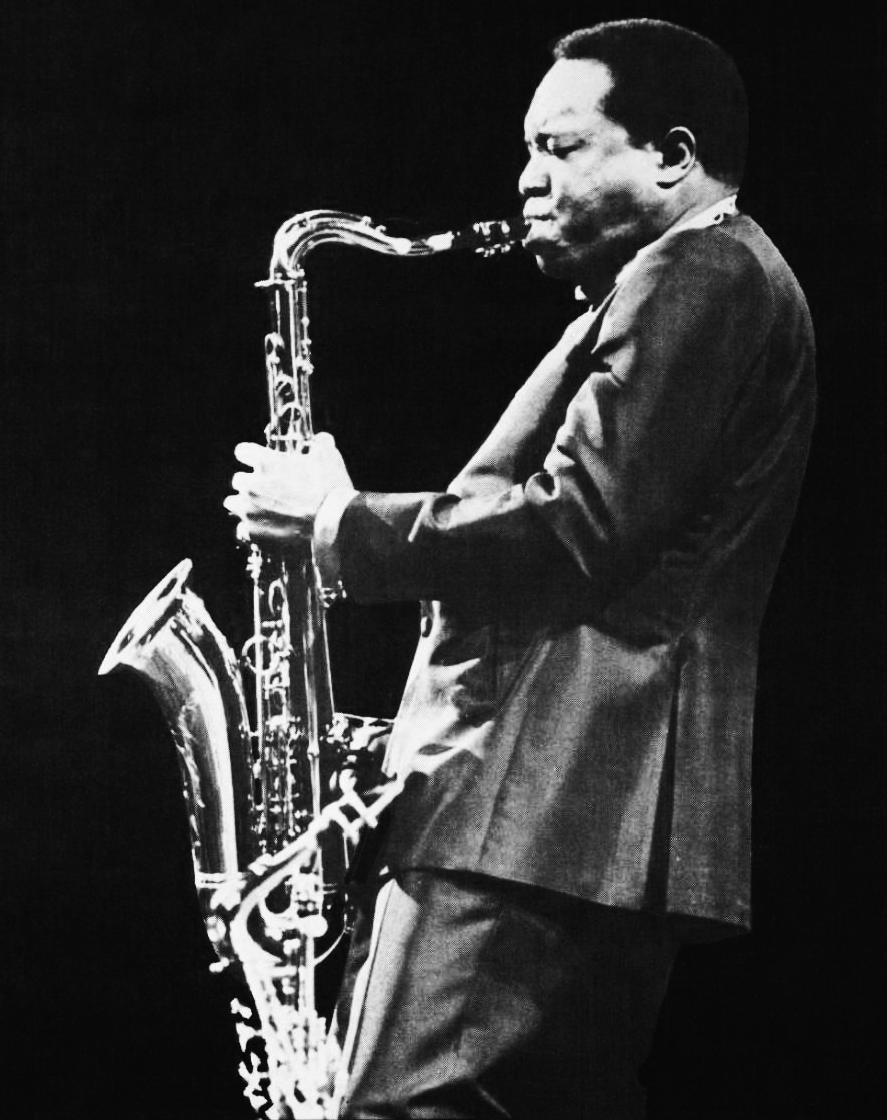
Saxophonist King Curtis topped the chart with "Soul Twist".

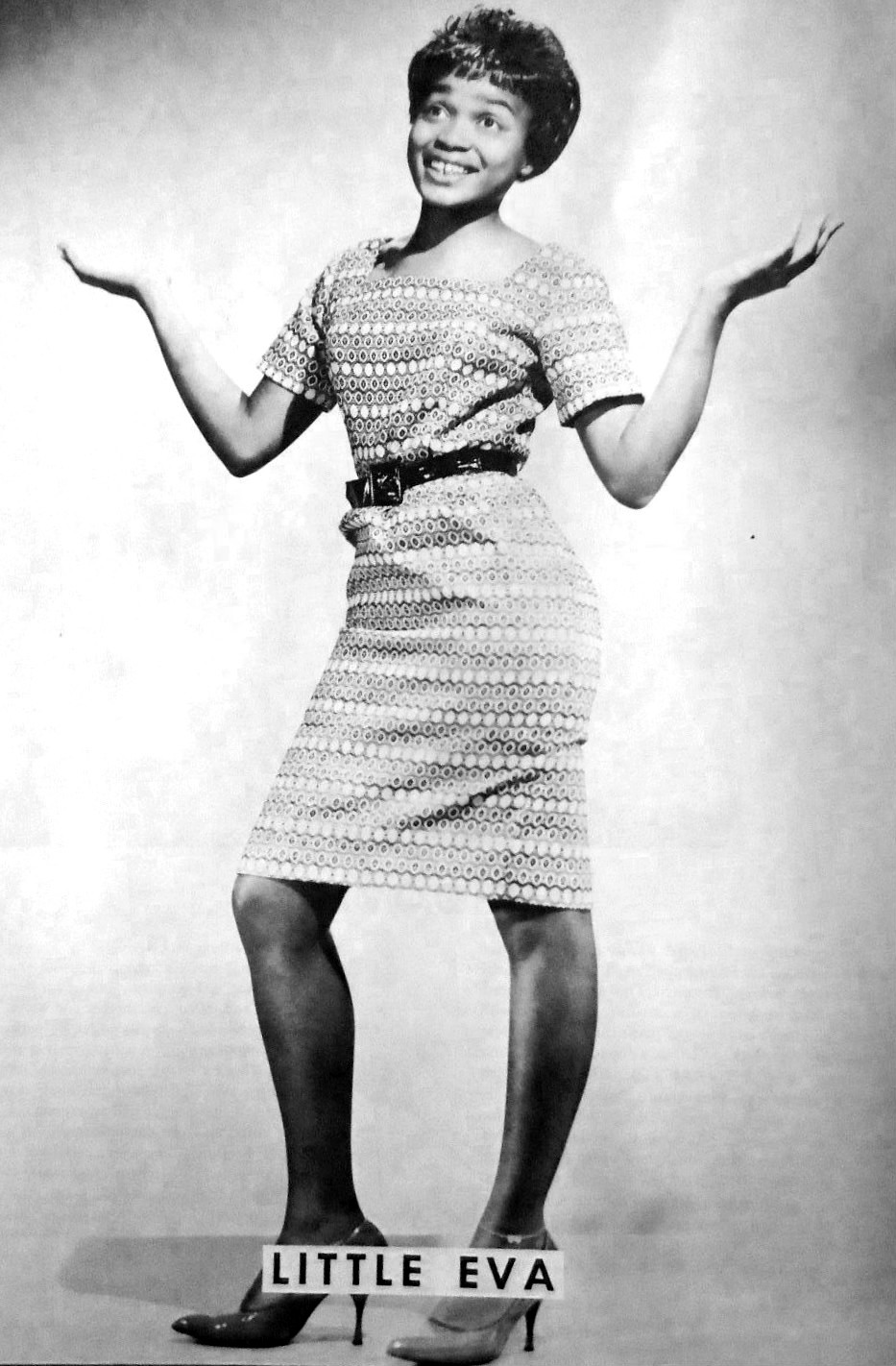
Little Eva's "The Loco-Motion" was one of a number of dance craze songs to top the R&B chart in 1962.

Key
†	Indicates best-charting R&B single of 1962

Chart history
Issue date	Title	Artist(s)	Ref.
January 6	"Unchain My Heart"	Ray Charles and his orchestra	
January 13	"Unchain My Heart"	Ray Charles and his orchestra	
January 20	"I Know (You Don't Love Me No More)"	Barbara George	
January 27	"I Know (You Don't Love Me No More)"	Barbara George	
February 3	"I Know (You Don't Love Me No More)"	Barbara George	
February 10	"I Know (You Don't Love Me No More)"	Barbara George	
February 17	"Duke of Earl"	Gene Chandler	
February 24	"Duke of Earl"	Gene Chandler	
March 3	"Duke of Earl"	Gene Chandler	
March 10	"Duke of Earl"	Gene Chandler	
March 17	"Duke of Earl"	Gene Chandler	
March 24	"Twistin' the Night Away"	Sam Cooke	
March 31	"Twistin' the Night Away"	Sam Cooke	
April 7	"Twistin' the Night Away"	Sam Cooke	
April 14	"Soul Twist" †	King Curtis and the Noble Knights	
April 21	"Soul Twist" †	King Curtis and the Noble Knights	
April 28	"Mashed Potato Time"	Dee Dee Sharp	
May 5	"Mashed Potato Time"	Dee Dee Sharp	
May 12	"Mashed Potato Time"	Dee Dee Sharp	
May 19	"Mashed Potato Time"	Dee Dee Sharp	
May 26	"I Can't Stop Loving You"	Ray Charles	
June 2	"I Can't Stop Loving You"	Ray Charles	
June 9	"I Can't Stop Loving You"	Ray Charles	
June 16	"I Can't Stop Loving You"	Ray Charles	
June 23	"I Can't Stop Loving You"	Ray Charles	
June 30	"I Can't Stop Loving You"	Ray Charles	
July 7	"I Can't Stop Loving You"	Ray Charles	
July 14	"I Can't Stop Loving You"	Ray Charles	
July 21	"I Can't Stop Loving You"	Ray Charles	
July 28	"I Can't Stop Loving You"	Ray Charles	
August 4	"You'll Lose a Good Thing"	Barbara Lynn	
August 11	"You'll Lose a Good Thing"	Barbara Lynn	
August 18	"You'll Lose a Good Thing"	Barbara Lynn	
August 25	"The Loco-Motion"	Little Eva	
September 1	"The Loco-Motion"	Little Eva	
September 8	"The Loco-Motion"	Little Eva	
September 15	"Green Onions"	Booker T. & the M.G.'s	
September 22	"You Beat Me to the Punch"	Mary Wells	
September 29	"Green Onions"	Booker T. & the M.G.'s	
October 6	"Sherry"	The 4 Seasons	
October 13	"Green Onions"	Booker T. & the M.G.'s	
October 20	"Do You Love Me"	The Contours	
October 27	"Green Onions"	Booker T. & the M.G.'s	
November 3	"Do You Love Me"	The Contours	
November 10	"Do You Love Me"	The Contours	
November 17	"Big Girls Don't Cry"	The 4 Seasons	
November 24	"Big Girls Don't Cry"	The 4 Seasons	
December 1	"Big Girls Don't Cry"	The 4 Seasons	
December 8	"Release Me"	Esther Phillips ("Little Esther")	
December 15	"You Are My Sunshine"	Ray Charles	
December 22	"Release Me"	Esther Phillips ("Little Esther")	
December 29	"You Are My Sunshine"	Ray Charles	
