= Chequered! =

1971 album by Chubby Checker

Studio album by Chubby Checker
- Released: 1971
- Genre: Psychedelic rock; psychedelic soul
- Length: 44:16
- Label: London
- Producer: Ed Chalpin

Chubby Checker chronology
The Chubby Checker Discotheque (1965)	Chequered! (1971)	The Change Has Come (1982)

Chequered! is a studio album released by American singer Chubby Checker. Released by London Records in 1971, it is notable for being a stylistically different approach for Checker, opting for the more psychedelic sound that was popular at the time. It was produced by Ed Chalpin, who was known for giving Jimi Hendrix his first recording contract.

The album did not sell well in its initial release, but it was eventually reissued several times throughout various European markets under different names, such as New Revelation, The Other Side of Chubby Checker, or simply Chubby Checker. In 2012, the original album was reissued by Sunbeam Records.

== Track listing ==
All songs written by Chubby Checker, except where noted.

Side one
No.	Title	Length
1.	"How Does It Feel?"	7:46
2.	"Stoned in the Bathroom"	2:41
3.	"No Need to Get So Heavy"	3:07
4.	"Let's Go Down"	3:33
5.	"My Mind"	4:24

Side two
No.	Title	Writer(s)	Length
6.	"Goodbye Victoria"		5:53
7.	"Love Tunnel"		5:15
8.	"Slow Lovin'"	Checker, Kat Dunn	4:11
9.	"He Died"		3:35
10.	"If the Sun Stopped Shining"		3:51

Bonus Track
No.	Title	Length
11.	"Gypsy"	4:57
