= Butterfly (1957 song) =

Song written by Bernie Lowe and Kal Mann

Single by Charlie Gracie
- B-side: "Ninety-Nine Ways"
- Released: January 1957
- Recorded: December 30, 1956
- Genre: Rockabilly
- Length: 2:22
- Label: Cameo Records 105
- Songwriters: Bernie Lowe, Kal Mann

Charlie Gracie singles chronology
| "Butterfly" (1957) | "Fabulous" (1957) |

"Butterfly"

Single by Andy Williams
- B-side: "It Doesn't Take Long"
- Released: February 1957
- Recorded: January 1957
- Genre: Pop
- Length: 2:18
- Label: Cadence Records 1308
- Songwriters: Bernie Lowe, Kal Mann

Andy Williams singles chronology
| "Baby Doll" (1956) | "Butterfly" (1957) | "I Like Your Kind of Love" (1957) |

"Butterfly" is a popular song written by Bernie Lowe and Kal Mann and published in 1957. The song is credited to Anthony September as songwriter in some sources. This was a pseudonym of Anthony Mammarella, producer of American Bandstand.

The original recording of the song by Charlie Gracie reached No. 1 on the Billboard Juke Box chart, No. 10 on the R&B chart and No. 12 on the UK Singles Chart in 1957.

== Andy Williams recording ==
A cover version by Andy Williams reached No. 1 on the Billboard Top 100 chart in 1957. Williams' version also reached No. 1 the UK in May 1957, where it spent two weeks, and also reached No. 14 on the US R&B chart.

The Charlie Gracie and Andy Williams versions were jointly ranked #20 on the first Canadian CHUM Chart on May 27, 1957, after they had already jointly peaked at #3 on Billboard's US competitor Cashbox's (sales) chart on April 6, 1957.

== Other versions ==
- A version recorded by Bob Carroll on Bally Records made the charts in 1957 peaking at No. 61.
- The Crests recorded a cover version for their 1960 album, The Crests Sing All Biggies.
- Tommy Steele - included on an EP Lord's Taverners Record - All Star Hit Parade No. 2 (1957).
- Cliff Richard - for his album Just... Fabulous Rock 'n' Roll (2016)
- Darlene Gillespie on her album Darlene of the Teens

== See also ==
- List of number-one singles from the 1950s (UK)
- List of Billboard number-one singles of 1957
