= Limbo Rock =

Single by Chubby Checker

from the album Limbo Party
- B-side: "Popeye the Hitchhiker"
- Released: October 1962
- Genre: Rock; rock and roll; limbo
- Length: 2:22
- Label: Parkway
- Songwriters: Kal Mann (as Jan Sheldon), Billy Strange

Chubby Checker singles chronology
"Dancin' Party" (1962)	"Limbo Rock" (1962)	"Let's Limbo Some More/Twenty Miles" (1963)

"Limbo Rock" is a popular song about limbo dancing written by Kal Mann (under the pseudonym Jan Sheldon) and Billy Strange. An instrumental version was first recorded by The Champs in 1961. The first vocal version was recorded in 1962 by Chubby Checker (on Parkway Records): it peaked at number two on the Billboard Hot 100 for two weeks (held out by "Telstar" by The Tornados) and at number one on the Cash Box charts. The Chubby Checker recording also made it to number three on the R&B charts. In Canada it reached number 7 for 2 weeks co-charting with the B-side.

Checker then released a sequel, "Let's Limbo Some More", in 1963, which peaked at #20 in the Billboard chart and #16 in Canada.

== Background and composition ==
In 1960, session guitarist Billy Strange and a friend were listening to a song on the radio. Strange sneered that he could write a better song in five minutes. His friend produced a hundred-dollar bill from his wallet and bet him he could not. Strange pulled out a notepad and came up with the tune in under five minutes, with the only lyrics being "What a monotonous melody" for every line, and pocketed the money. Whilst later doing a recording session for Ricky Nelson, Strange was asked if he had a song for recording. As a joke he sang the "What a monotonous melody" song. A few months later Chubby Checker's manager Kal Mann asked Strange if he could record the song with different lyrics that became "Limbo Rock". Some months later, Strange was amazed to receive a royalty check from Broadcast Music, Inc. (BMI) for $63,000. Thinking it was a mistake, he telephoned BMI to ask about it and was told that the check was indeed his money, earned from the Champs' and Chubby Checker's renditions of "Monotonous Melody" under the title "Limbo Rock".

The song is noted for Checker's high-pitched witchy laugh, which is heard between most of the choruses of the song. Checker does a couple of monologues between the first and second verses, as well as the third verse and the final whistling chorus. They are: "Limbo lower now (2x) / How low can you go", and "Don't move that limbo bar / You'll be a limbo star / How low can you go." A male chorus sings the "La la" chorus between the second and third verses. There is also a drum riff between some of the verses and choruses, including the one that ends the song, too. Checker's witchy laugh is heard a few times in the sequel "Let's Limbo Some More," the nursery rhyme "Jack be nimble, Jack be quick, Jack jumped over the candlestick," is altered with the line: "Jack go under Limbo stick."

In a performance on The Ed Sullivan Show, Checker danced the Limbo on stage.

== Chart performance ==
=== All-time charts ===
Chart (1958–2018)	Position
US Billboard Hot 100	347

== 2003 remix ==
Chubby Checker released a remix of the song in 2003, titled "Limbo Rock (Remixes)", produced by Mike Rogers and Gary Lefkowith and featuring Inner Circle. Phil Sweetland, writing for the New York Times stated that at "age 62 and 43 years after 'The Twist,' Chubby Checker has once again comes up with a top-five single: a hip-hop-flavored version of another of his 1960's hits, 'Limbo Rock.'" Sweetland also states that "the Dec. 20 issue of Billboard listed the song at No. 3 on its hot dance singles sales chart, making it Mr. Checker's first top-five hit since the original 'Limbo Rock' in 1962."

== Soundtrack ==
- The 1962 Chubby Checker recording was featured in the 1988 film Hairspray.
- This song also appeared on the soundtrack for the ABC television series Moonlighting, released in 1987. It was featured in the episode "My Fair David" with the David Addison character instigating a limbo contest in the office of Blue Moon Investigations in an attempt to boost employee morale.

== Cover versions ==
- In 1962, Herb Alpert & The Tijuana Brass included it on The Lonely Bull album.
- In 1991, Joanie Bartels covered the song, releasing it as a single from the album Dancin' Magic. It also appeared on the compilation album The Stars of Discovery Music and in the 1993 video The Rainy Day Adventure.
- In 1995, the song was covered by the cast of Mickey's Fun Songs in the episode "Beach Party at Walt Disney World".
- A parody cover called Lindows Rock was released by Lindows, Inc. (later known as Linspire, Inc.), to promote their operating system of the same name.
