= Soul Twist =

Single by King Curtis
- B-side: "Twisting Time"
- Released: 1962
- Genre: R&B
- Length: 2:35
- Label: Enjoy
- Composer(s): King Curtis
- Producer(s): Bobby Robinson, Danny Robinson

King Curtis singles chronology
"Soul Twist" (1962)	"Beach Party" (1962)

"Soul Twist" is a 1962 instrumental crossover single for saxophonist, King Curtis. His debut single on the R&B charts was his most successful, hitting number one for two weeks. "Soul Twist" crossed over to the top 40, where it was one of three singles by King Curtis to make the chart.

== Chart positions ==
Chart (1962)	Peak position
U.S. Billboard Hot 100	17
U.S. Billboard Hot R&B Sides	1

== See also ==
- List of number-one R&B singles of 1962 (U.S.)
