= Let's Twist Again =

1961 single by Chubby Checker

Single by Chubby Checker

from the album Let's Twist Again
- B-side: "Everything's Gonna' Be All Right"
- Released: June 19, 1961
- Genre: Rock and roll, doo-wop
- Length: 2:16
- Label: Parkway 824n
- Songwriters: Kal Mann, Dave Appell
- Producer: Kal Mann

Chubby Checker singles chronology
"The Mess Around" (1961)	"Let's Twist Again" (1961)	"The Fly" (1961)

"Let's Twist Again" is a song written by Kal Mann and Dave Appell, and released as a single by Chubby Checker. One of the biggest hit singles of 1961, it reached No. 8 on the U.S. Billboard pop chart (No. 3 on Cash Box) in August of that year and subsequently reached No. 2 in the UK in the spring of 1962. The song refers to the Twist dance craze and Checker's 1960 single "The Twist", a two-time U.S. No. 1 single (in September 1960 and again in January 1962 on re-release).

A reissue of the song, officially a double A-side with "The Twist", reached No. 5 in the UK in December 1975.

The song received the 1962 Grammy Award for Best Rock & Roll Recording. Checker also recorded the song in German as "Der Twist Beginnt" and in Italian as "Balliamo il Twist". An imitation of Adolf Hitler singing "Der Twist Beginnt" would later be used by The Residents to begin their 1976 album The Third Reich 'n Roll. The song appears on the soundtrack of the 2011 film The Help.

== Chart performance ==
Chart (1961–1962)	Peak position
Belgium Singles Chart	1
Canada (CHUM Chart)	2
Dutch Singles Chart	1
French Singles Chart	18
German Singles Chart	12
Norwegian Singles Chart	2
Sweden (Tio i Topp)	1
United Kingdom (Record Retailer)	2
United Kingdom (NME)	1
United States Billboard Hot 100	8
United States Cash Box Top 100	3
US Hot R&B Singles	26

Chart (1976)	Peak position
Austrian Singles Chart	11
Belgium Singles Chart	1
Dutch Singles Chart	3
Ireland Singles Chart	11
Norwegian Singles Chart	5
Swedish Singles Chart	10

Chart (2012)	Peak position
French Singles Chart	155

== Johnny Hallyday version (in French) ==
"Viens danser le twist"

Single by Johnny Hallyday

from the album Viens danser le Twist
- Language: French
- English title: Come dance the twist
- B-side: "Let's Twist Again (English version)"
- Released: September 25, 1961
- Recorded: Summer–fall 1961
- Studio: Fontana Studios, London
- Genre: Rock and roll
- Length: 4:12
- Label: Philips
- Songwriters: Kal Mann, Dave Appell, Georges Gosset (French adaption)
- Producers: Lee Hallyday, Jack Baverstock

Johnny Hallyday singles chronology
"Nous quand on s'embrasse" (1961)	"Viens danser le twist" (1961)	"Retiens la nuit" / "Ya ya twist" (1962)

The song was covered in French by Johnny Hallyday. His version (titled "Viens danser le twist", French for Come dance the twist) was released in September 1961 and spent seven weeks in total at No. 1 on the singles sales chart in France (from 13 November to 13 December 1961 and from 13 January to 9 February 1962). In Wallonia (French Belgium) his single spent 40 weeks on the chart, also peaking at No. 1.

=== Charts ===
Chart (1961–1962)	Peak position
Belgium (Ultratop 50 Wallonia)	1
France (singles sales)	1
Chart (2000)	Peak position
France (SNEP)	40

== See also ==
- List of twist songs
