= Popeye the Hitchhiker =

Single by Chubby Checker

from the album All the Hits (For Your Dancin' Party)
- A-side: "Limbo Rock"
- Released: October 1962
- Genre: Rock and roll
- Length: 2:25
- Label: Parkway; 849
- Songwriter(s): Kal Mann, Dave Appell

Chubby Checker singles chronology
"Dancin' Party" (1962)	"Popeye the Hitchhiker" (1962)	"Let's Limbo Some More/Twenty Miles" (1963)

"Popeye the Hitchhiker" is a song written by Kal Mann and Dave Appell and performed by Chubby Checker. In 1962, the track reached No. 10 on the Billboard Hot 100 and No. 13 on the U.S. R&B. In Canada it reached number 7 for 2 weeks co-charting with the A-side.

It was featured on his 1962 compilation album, All the Hits (For Your Dancin' Party).

== Other versions ==
- Duane Eddy released a version on his 1962 album, Dance with the Guitar Man.
- "Jump Around" by House of Pain samples Checker's version.
