= Dee Dee Sharp =

American R&B singer (born 1945)

- Born: Dione LaRue; September 9, 1945 (age 81); Philadelphia, Pennsylvania, U.S.
- Genres: R&B, soul
- Occupation: Singer
- Years active: 1961–present
- Labels: Cameo; Atco; Atlantic; Gamble; Philadelphia International; Highland Music, Inc.
- Website: deedeesharp.net

Dione LaRue (born September 9, 1945), known professionally as Dee Dee Sharp, is an American R&B singer. She was one of the first Black female teenage pop stars to achieve mainstream national success in the early 1960s.

At the age of 16, Sharp achieved her breakthrough with the duet "Slow Twistin'" alongside Chubby Checker in 1962. Her debut single "Mashed Potato Time" (1962) reached No. 2 on the Billboard Hot 100 and sold more than one million copies. She followed it with several additional top 10 hits, including "Gravy (For My Mashed Potatoes)" (1962), "Ride!" (1962), and "Do the Bird" (1963). A frequent performer on American Bandstand, Sharp also appeared on Dick Clark's Caravan of Stars tours. She later had dance hits with the songs "Share My Love" (1975) and "Breaking and Entering" (1981).

== Early life and education ==
Dee Dee Sharp was born Dione LaRue in Philadelphia on September 9, 1945. She began playing the piano from an early age and directed church choirs for her grandfather's church and other congregations in her hometown. She grew up in North Philadelphia and graduated from Overbrook High School.

== Career ==
=== Career as a session vocalist ===
When she was 13, her mother was seriously injured in a car accident. After overhearing her grandparents discuss the severity of her mother's injuries, Sharp decided to find work to help support her family. With her grandmother's approval—on the condition that she continue her education—she answered a newspaper advertisement seeking a singer who could sight-read music, play piano, and sing. Sharp was hired by gospel singer Willa Ward Moultrie, who employed her as a backing vocalist. Soon, Sharp began recording with artists including Lloyd Price, Bobby Rydell, Frankie Avalon, and Jackie Wilson while continuing to attend school.

=== Rise to fame and mainstream success ===
By 1962, singer Chubby Checker had become Parkway Records' biggest star, having charted nearly twenty singles in his first two and a half years with the label, and popularizing the twist dance craze. According to Sharp, Checker discovered her while she was providing backing vocals during one of his recording sessions and recommended her to Bernie Lowe, head of Cameo-Parkway Records. Seeking to extend the success of his dance-oriented recordings, Sharp was paired with Checker on a recording. The result was a duet, although Sharp was not credited on the original single release. Released in February 1962, "Slow Twistin'" entered the Top 10 within three weeks.

She was immediately signed by Cameo Records as a solo artist Mann and Lowe renamed her Dee Dee Sharp—a nickname derived from her brother's habit of calling her "Dee" and because she sang in the key of D-sharp. The same say that she recorded "Slow Twistin'," she also recorded her debut solo single, "Mashed Potato Time," which was released in February 1962. The song reached No. 2 on the Billboard Hot 100, sold more than one million copies, and earned a gold disc. At the age of 16, this success made Sharp one of the first Black female teen idols. Sharp was offered "The Loco-Motion", a song written by Gerry Goffin and Carole King, but declined to record it. The song was subsequently recorded by Little Eva and became a No. 1 hit on the Billboard Hot 100 in 1962.

In April 1962, Sharp accompanied Checker on the road as his opening act at the 1962 Seattle World's Fair.

Sharp followed her breakthrough with a string of Billboard Hot 100 top 10 hits: "Gravy (For My Mashed Potatoes)" (No. 9), "Ride!" (No. 5), and "Do the Bird" (No. 10). "Ride!" also sold more than one million copies and received a gold disc. "Do the Bird" became her only entry on the UK Singles Chart, peaking at No. 46 in April 1963.

Cameo marketed Sharp as a pop artist, and as a result she made relatively few appearances on the Chitlin' Circuit. The label also sent her to modeling and charm school. From 1962 to 1981 she appeared several times on American Bandstand, the ABC Television Network music-performance and dance series hosted by Dick Clark. She was also a regular feature on Clark's Caravan of Stars tours. In 1965, Sharp performed the jazz song "Steady, Steady" on The Ed Sullivan Show. Unhappy with record sales, she switched to Atco/Atlantic Records in 1966.

In 1967, Sharp married Kenny Gamble of the songwriting and production duo Gamble & Huff. Sharp recorded for Gamble Records and Philadelphia International, and she worked with Gamble & Huff behind the scene at various iterations of TSOP (The Sound of Philadelphia) Records.

=== Resurgence and later years ===
As Dee Dee Sharp Gamble, she had a career resurgence during the disco era and hit the charts again with her version of 10 CC's "I'm Not In Love." She also joined Lou Rawls, Billy Paul, Teddy Pendergrass, The O'Jays and Archie Bell as a member of the Philadelphia International All Stars, who had a minor hit with "Let's Clean Up the Ghetto." In 1980 she spent four weeks at number one on the Hot Dance Club Play chart with "Breaking and Entering" / "Easy Money," from her album Dee Dee.

Sharp has continued to perform into the 21st century. She appeared at Pontins in the United Kingdom as part of the Northern Soul Show, performed at the 2008 Detroit Jazz Festival, and appeared at the Salle de l'Hôtel de Ville in Belgium in May 2009. In 2017, she performed at Jerry Blavat's Gospel, Soul and Doo Wop Reunion in Philadelphia.

== Personal life ==
In a documentary film, Muhammad Ali: The Whole Story (1996), Sharp revealed that she was engaged to boxer Muhammad Ali—then known as Cassius Clay. They had met when Sharp had a residency at the Knight Beat nightclub in Overtown, Miami in 1963. According to Sharp, Ali proposed to her before his first heavyweight champion fight Sonny Liston in Miami Beach in 1964. Sharp accepted, but Ali said he first needed to consult Malcolm X before making final arrangements. Sharp recalled that Malcolm X told her they could marry only if she converted to the Nation of Islam. After learning of the conversion requirement, Sharp's mother refused to give her approval, ending the engagement.

Sharp was married to Kenny Gamble from 1967 to 1980, during which time she was known as Dee Dee Sharp Gamble.

Sharp and her husband Bill Witherspoon reside in Medford, New Jersey.

== Legacy ==
In 2017, Sharp was inducted into the Philadelphia Music Alliance's Walk of Fame.

== In pop culture ==
In 1992, Sharp's 1962 hit "Gravy (For My Mashed Potatoes)" was featured in a scene in the American movie comedy Sister Act which starred Whoopi Goldberg. It was also included as part of the film's soundtrack album.

== Discography ==
Dee Dee Sharp has released 9 studio albums and 14 compilation albums.

=== Studio albums ===
Year	Album	Peak chart positions	
Year	Album	US	US R&B
1962	It's Mashed Potato Time	44	—
1962	Songs of Faith	—	—
1962	Down to Earth (with Chubby Checker)	117	—
1963	Do the Bird	—	—
1963	Down Memory Lane	—	—
1963	Wild	—	—
1975	Happy 'Bout the Whole Thing	—	48
1977	What Color Is Love (as Dee Dee Sharp Gamble, in association with Kenneth Gamble)	—	—
1980	Dee Dee	—	59
"—" denotes a recording that did not chart or was not released in that territory.

=== Compilation albums ===
- 1963: 18 Golden Hits
- 1963: All the Hits
- 1963: Biggest Hits
- 1979: Cameo-Parkway Sessions
- 1993: All the Hits & More
- 1995: All the Golden Hits
- 1998: What Color Is Love / Dee Dee
- 2004: Chubby Checker, Bobby Rydell, Dee Dee Sharp – Bobby Rydell & Chubby Checker and Down to Earth
- 2005: Best of Dee Dee Sharp 1962–1966
- 2006: Sharp Goes Wild
- 2010: It's Mashed Potato Time / Do the Bird
- 2010: Happy 'Bout the Whole Thing + What Color Is Love + Dee Dee
- 2015: Hurry On Down, It's Mashed Potato Time
- 2020: The Queen of Rhythm & Blues

=== Singles ===
Year	Single (A-side, B-side) Both sides from same album except where indicated	Label and number	Chart positions					Album *Wyncote label compilations of various Cameo-Parkway artists
Year	Single (A-side, B-side) Both sides from same album except where indicated	Label and number	US	US R&B	US Dance	CAN	UK	Album *Wyncote label compilations of various Cameo-Parkway artists
1962	"Slow Twistin'" (Chubby Checker & Dee Dee Sharp) b/w "La Paloma Twist" (by Chubby Checker, non-album track)	Parkway 835	3	3	—	18	—	It's Mashed Potato Time
1962	"Mashed Potato Time" b/w "Set My Heart at Ease" (Non-album track)	Cameo 212	2	1	—	2	—	It's Mashed Potato Time
1962	"Gravy (For My Mashed Potatoes)" b/w "Baby Cakes" (Non-album track)	Cameo 219	9	11	—	12	—	It's Mashed Potato Time
1962	"Ride!" b/w "The Night" (Non-album track)	Cameo 230	5	7	—	15	—	All the Hits by Dee Dee Sharp Volume II
1963	"Do the Bird" b/w "Lover Boy" (from Hullabaloo with the Stars*)	Cameo 244	10	8	—	32	46	Do the Bird
1963	"Rock Me in the Cradle of Love" b/w "You'll Never Be Mine" (from Hullabaloo with the Stars*)	Cameo 260	43	—	—	36	—	Biggest Hits
1963	"Wild!" b/w "Why Doncha Ask Me?" (from Do the Bird)	Cameo 274	33	25	—	27	—	All the Hits with All the Stars*
1964	"Where Did I Go Wrong" /	Cameo 296	82	—	—	—	—	Shindig with the Stars*
1964	"Willyam, Willyam"	Cameo 296	97	—	—	—	—	Hullabaloo with the Stars Vol. 2*
1964	"Never Pick a Pretty Boy" b/w "He's No Ordinary Guy" (Non-album track)	Cameo 329	—	—	—	—	—	Hits a Go-Go with the Stars*
1964	"Deep Dark Secret" b/w "Good"	Cameo 335	—	—	—	—	—	Non-album tracks
1964	"To Know Him Is to Love Him" b/w "There Ain't Nothin' I Wouldn't Do for You"	Cameo 347	—	—	—	—	—	Non-album tracks
1965	"Let's Twine" b/w "(That's What) My Mama Said"	Cameo 357	—	—	—	—	—	Non-album tracks
1965	"I Really Love You" b/w "Standing in the Need of Love"	Cameo 375	78	37	—	28	—	Non-album tracks
1966	"(It's Wonderful) The Love I Feel for You" b/w "Willyam, Willyam"	Fairmount 1004	—	—	—	—	—	Non-album tracks
1966	"It's a Funny Situation" b/w "There Ain't Nothin' I Wouldn't Do for You"	Cameo 382	126	—	—	—	—	Non-album tracks
1966	"My Best Friend's Man" b/w "Bye Bye Baby"	Atco 6445	—	—	—	—	—	Non-album tracks
1967	"What Am I Gonna Do" b/w "(Heart and Soul) Baby I Love You"	Atco 6502	—	—	—	—	—	Non-album tracks
1968	"We Got a Thing Going On" b/w "What 'Cha Gonna Do About It"; Both tracks: Ben E. King & Dee Dee Sharp	Atco 6557	—	—	—	—	—	Non-album tracks
1968	"A Woman Will Do Wrong" b/w "You're Just a Fool in Love"	Atco 6576	—	—	—	—	—	Non-album tracks
1968	"Help Me Find My Groove" b/w "This Love Won't Run Out"	Atco 6587	—	—	—	—	—	Non-album tracks
1968	"What Kind of Lady" b/w "You're Gonna Miss Me (When I'm Gone)"	Gamble 219	—	—	—	—	—	Non-album tracks
1970	"The Bottle or Me" b/w "You're Gonna Miss Me (When I'm Gone)"	Gamble 4005	—	—	—	—	—	Non-album tracks
1971	"Conquer the World" b/w "We Got a Thing Going On"; Both sides: Dee Dee Sharp Gamble with Bunny Sigler	Philadelphia International 3512	—	—	—	—	—	Non-album tracks
1974	"Happy 'Bout the Whole Thing" b/w "Touch My Life"	TSOP 4776	—	—	—	—	—	Happy 'Bout the Whole Thing
1975	"Share My Love"	Album cut	—	—	6	—	—	Happy 'Bout the Whole Thing
1976	"I'm Not in Love" b/w "Make It Till Tomorrow"	TSOP 4778	—	62	—	—	—	Happy 'Bout the Whole Thing
1977	"Nobody Could Take Your Place" b/w "Flashback"	Philadelphia International 3625	—	—	—	—	—	What Color Is Love
1977	"I'd Really Love to See You Tonight" b/w "What Color Is Love"	Philadelphia International 3636	—	—	—	—	—	What Color Is Love
1978	"Just as Long as I Know You're Mine" b/w "I Believe in Love"	Philadelphia International 3638	—	—	—	—	—	What Color Is Love
1978	"I Wanna Be Your Woman" b/w "Trying to Get the Feeling Again"	Philadelphia International 3644	—	—	—	—	—	What Color Is Love
1981	"Easy Money" b/w "I Love You Anyway"	Philadelphia International 70058	—	—	—	—	—	Dee Dee
1981	"Breaking and Entering"	Philadelphia International 02041	—	—	1	—	—	Dee Dee
1981	"I Love You Anyway"	Philadelphia International 02041	—	79	—	—	—	Dee Dee
"—" denotes releases that did not chart or were not released in that territory.

== See also ==
- List of artists who reached number one on the Billboard R&B chart
- List of artists who reached number one on the U.S. Dance Club Songs chart
- List of disco artists (A–E)
- List of people from Philadelphia
- List of acts who appeared on American Bandstand
