= Charlie Gracie =

American singer and guitarist (1936–2022)

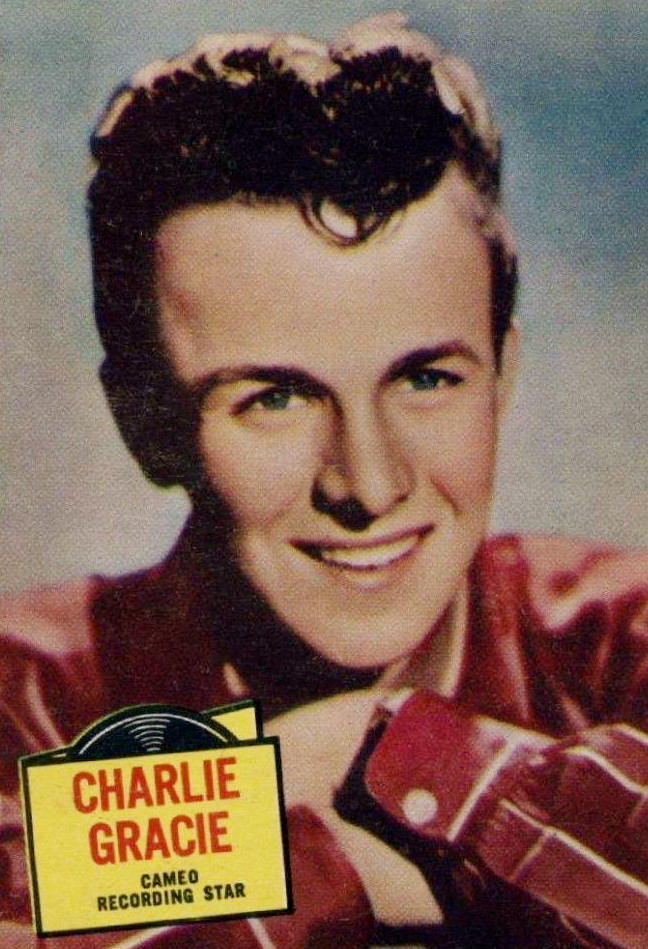
- Gracie in 1957

Background information
- Born: Charles Anthony Graci; May 14, 1936; Philadelphia, Pennsylvania, U.S.
- Died: December 16, 2022 (aged 86) Philadelphia, Pennsylvania, U.S.
- Genres: Rockabilly, rock and roll
- Occupations: Singer, musician
- Instruments: Guitar, vocals
- Years active: 1950–2022
- Labels: Cadillac; 20th Century; Cameo; Coral; Roulette; London; Felsted; President
- Website: charliegracie.com

Charles Anthony Graci (May 14, 1936 – December 16, 2022), known professionally as Charlie Gracie, was an American rock and roll and rhythm and blues singer and guitarist. His biggest hits were "Butterfly" and "Fabulous", both in 1957.

== Career ==
=== Early career ===
Charlie Gracie was born in South Philadelphia to Santo ("Sam") and Mary Graci (née Cappizzi), who were both of Sicilian heritage. At the age of 10, Gracie's father encouraged him to play the guitar. His musical career started at the age of 16 when he appeared on the Paul Whiteman television show in 1952. Gracie performed at weddings, local restaurants, and parties, and on local radio and television. He also won regional talent contests. Charlie graduated from South Philadelphia High School in 1952.

The owner of Cadillac Records, Graham Prince, heard one of Gracie's early radio performances, contacted the young musician and signed him to a recording contract. This association yielded the single "Boogie Woogie Blues" backed with "I'm Gonna Sit Right Down And Write Myself A Letter". The record led to Charlie's first appearance on Bob Horn's American Bandstand television program, four years before Dick Clark became the host. After cutting two more singles for Cadillac, including one called "Rockin' 'n' Rollin'" in 1952, Charlie moved on to 20th Century Records, where he put out another four sides. The discs he made embraced a wide variety of styles: jump blues, gospel, and country boogie with the influences of Big Joe Turner, B.B. King, Louis Jordan, Roy Acuff, and Hank Williams.

=== Cameo success years ===
By 1956, Philadelphia had given birth to the new Cameo record label. Its founders, in search of a strong talent for the booming rock and roll market, signed Gracie later that year. With a $600 budget, this new union went into the recording studio to record "Butterfly" backed with "Ninety Nine Ways". It became a hit record, reaching number one in jukebox plays in the Billboard chart. Gracie received a gold disc for the two million plus sales. His only other Top 40 hit was with a song entitled "Fabulous" the same year, which reached number 16. This track also reached number 6 in the UK. Two other substantial sellers followed: "Wandering Eyes", his third Billboard Top 100 hit, which peaked at number 71 (another number 6 in the UK), and "Cool Baby" (also a top 30 hit in Britain). The financial success of these hits bankrolled the Cameo label, which became a dominant force in the music industry for several years.

Gracie's personal appearances grew until he performed and headlined some of the biggest venues of that time: Alan Freed's rock and roll shows at the Brooklyn Paramount, The Ed Sullivan Show, American Bandstand and the 500 Club in Atlantic City, New Jersey. He appeared in the 1957 film Jamboree and toured with Chuck Berry, the Everly Brothers, Bo Diddley and his close friend Eddie Cochran.

Gracie became only the second American rock and roller to bring this new art form to the British concert stage. His two extensive tours in 1957 and 1958 were topped off by headlining the Palladium and the Hippodrome in London. In the audiences, among Gracie's fans, were future rock musicians Graham Nash, and members of the Beatles. These performers and many other well-known acts have credited Gracie as an influence. George Harrison referred to Gracie's guitar technique as 'brilliant' in a March 1996 interview with Billboard; Paul McCartney invited Gracie to the premiere party of his 1999 release which paid tribute to the early pioneers of rock music.

According to the documentary film Wages of Spin, Gracie sued Cameo Records for unpaid royalties and in retaliation was blacklisted from the radio and American Bandstand. Per the film, Bandstand host Dick Clark had a relationship with the record company and was paid $14,000 for services related to Gracie's song "Butterfly".

=== Later career ===
After Cameo, Gracie moved on to other record labels such as Coral, Roulette, Felsted, and Diamond, performing more of the R&B he preferred. Even as success slowed, he continued to perform in clubs, theaters, and resorts all over the USA and Europe, from the 1960s through the 1990s and into the 2000s. He enjoyed a loyal following in the United Kingdom, Germany, Austria, Switzerland, France, and the Netherlands, where he regularly toured - thanks in part to his friend and manager, Paul Barrett who represented Charlie until Paul's passing in 2019.

During the late 1990s, he was introduced to Quentin Jones, a guitarist, studio owner and label head. Jones had a strong background in roots music, having played in a rockabilly band produced by the Stray Cats bassist Lee Rocker. He also played lead guitar on Robert Gordon's 1996 self-titled CD. Gracie and Jones met at Valley Forge, Pennsylvania. They decided to record an album together with Jones acting as producer. He brought in bandmate Dave Ferrara to play drums. Jones played bass guitar, combining with Gracie's guitar and vocals. Gracie invited Jones and Ferrara to back him when Van Morrison commissioned Gracie to open his 2000 West Coast tour.

Contributing their musical talents on his latest CD were Tommy Conwell, whose guitar playing is featured on "Still 19", Ralph Miller on piano, Daryl Jenkins on saxophone, and Pete Barnhart on percussion. Graham Nash contributed vocals to the song "A little Too Soon To Tell".

Gracie's pioneering contribution to the genre was recognized by the Rockabilly Hall of Fame and he was inducted into the South Philadelphia High School Alumni Cultural Hall of Fame.

In 2007, a documentary film about Gracie, Fabulous, was aired on PBS stations.

In 2011, ABKCO released the CD For The Love of Charlie produced by Al Kooper and co produced by Quentin Jones, with guest artists Graham Nash, Peter Noone, Jimmy Vivino, Craig Ross, and Dennis Diken, with Gracie singing some of his own songs and some covers.

From 2011 to 2016, Gracie and his son hosted the local radio program "A Fabulous Hour with Charlie Gracie", which aired on Sunday afternoons on WVLT-FM, a classic hits station known as Crusin 92.1FM, based in Vineland, New Jersey, that serves the Southern New Jersey, Northern Delaware and Philadelphia broadcast markets. It spotlighted Gracie's recordings as well as many of his favorites from other artists, and included requests from his family and friends.

On Gracie's 75th birthday, he recorded "Baby Doll" with Producers / Writers Gary Lefkowith and Mike Rogers. The track featured guitarist/vocalist Richie Scarlet, best known for his work with Ace Frehley, Sebastian Bach and Mountain (as well as producing such acts as The Chesterfield Kings). Released in the fall of 2011, it was his first single in over 50 years to receive UK airplay on the BBC. In the US, the record entered the Top 100 on Mediabase's Top 40 Chart, from the strength of Airplay at Sirius XM. Richie Scarlet is featured on lead guitar and played with Gracie at the Bitter End, in New York City, on March 30, 2012, after a live radio broadcast at WFUV. WXPK and WXPN played "Baby Doll," as well, in regular rotation. The World Café featured Gracie at their Philadelphia venue during the same time period, in support of the record.

Gracie was inducted into the Broadcast Pioneers of Philadelphia Hall of Fame on November 16, 2012, at the Hilton City Avenue, Philadelphia.

In 2019, Gracie toured the UK with Marty Wilde along with Mike Berry, Nancy Ann Lee and the Wildcats.

He continued to perform at many places in the Philadelphia area, and for many years had annual concerts during the summer at Rose Tree Park in Media, Pennsylvania, and Goshen Country Fair in West Chester, Pennsylvania.

== Personal life and death ==
After dealing with COVID-19 complications since the spring, Gracie died in Philadelphia on December 16, 2022, at the age of 86. He was married for over 60 years to his wife Joan. They had two children, a son and a daughter.

== Discography ==
=== Studio albums ===
- 1980 – Rockin' Philadelphia – Big Beat
- 1981 – The Fabulous Charlie Gracie – Blackjack
- 1982 – Amazing Gracie – Charly
- 2001 – I'm Alright – Lanark
- 2004 – Just Hangin' Around – Rhythm Bomb
- 2004 – Rockin' Italy (and the Jumpin' Shoes) – Rockhouse
- 2007 – Gracie Swings Again – Rhythm Bomb
- 2011 – For the Love of Charlie – ABCKO
- 2015 – Angel on My Shoulder – Lanark

=== Live albums ===
- 1983 – Live at the Stockton Globe – August 26, 1957 – Rollercoaster Records UK
- 2004 – An Evening With Charlie Gracie – Rockstar

=== Compilations ===
- 1978 – Cameo-Parkway Sessions – London
- 1999 – It's Fabulous – Stomper Time
- 2006 – The Best of Charlie Gracie: Cameo Parkway 1956–1958 – ABKCO
- 2009 – The Fabulous Charlie Gracie
- 2011 – For the Love of Charlie

=== Singles ===
(Not Exhaustive)

- 1951 – "Boogie Woogie Blues" / "I'm Gonna Sit Right Down and Write Myself a Letter" – Cadillac
- 1951 – "All Over Town" / "Rockin' an' Rollin'" – Cadillac
- 1953 – "T'Ain't No Sin in Rhythm" / "Say What You Mean" – Cadillac
- 1955 – "My Baby Loves Me" / "Head Home, Honey!" – 20th Century
- 1955 – "Wildwood Boogie" / "Honey! Honey!" – 20th Century
- 1957 – "Butterfly" / "Ninety-Nine Ways" – Cameo
- 1957 – "Fabulous" / "Just Lookin'" – Cameo
- 1957 – "I Love You So Much It Hurts" / "Wanderin' Eyes" – Cameo
- 1957 – "Cool Baby" / "You Got a Heart Like a Rock" – Cameo
- 1958 – "Crazy Girl" / "Dressin' Up" – Cameo
- 1959 – "Doodlebug" / "Hurry Up, Buttercup" – Coral
- 1959 – "Angel of Love" / "I'm a Fool, That's Why" – Coral
- 1959 – "Oh-Well-A" / "Because I Love You So" – Coral
- 1960 – "The Race" / "I Looked for You" – Roulette
- 1962 – "Pretty Baby" / "Night and Day, U.S.A." – President
- 1965 – "He'll Never Love You Like I Do" / "Keep My Love Next to Your Heart" – Diamond
- 1968 – "Walk with Me Girl" / "Tenderness" – Sock 'n' Soul
- 1978 – "Fabulous" / "Makin' Whoopie" / "Wow...w" – London (UK)
- 1981 – "You Mostest Girl" / "Rockin' the Boogie" – Blackjack (Belgium)
- 2011 – "Baby Doll" (featuring Richie Scarlet) – Generic Records

=== Chart singles ===
Year	Title	Chart positions			
Year	Title	US Billboard	US Cashbox	UK	CAN
1957	"Butterfly"	1	3	12	20
1957	"Fabulous"	16	14	8	6
1957	"I Love You So Much It Hurts" / "Wanderin' Eyes"	71 —	— —	14; 6	— —
1958	"Cool Baby"	—	—	26	—

== Filmography ==
Appearances

- Jamboree (aka Disc Jockey Jamboree) directed by Roy Lockwood

Documentary

- Fabulous – documentary about Charlie Gracie's career
