= Bernie Lowe =

American composer, producer, bandleader (1917–1993)

Bernard Lowe (born Lowenthal, November 22, 1917 – September 1, 1993) was an American songwriter, record producer, arranger, pianist and bandleader.

Born in Philadelphia, Lowe started Teen Records and in 1955 was working with Freddie Bell and the Bellboys. He asked Bell to rewrite the lyrics of "Hound Dog" to appeal to a broader radio audience. Teen Records and the group had a regional hit with this version of the song, which was one of four songs the group did with Lowe. It was this same version that Elvis Presley heard in Las Vegas, Nevada, adopted, recorded, and made his own. Lowe went on to co-pen with Kal Mann the chart-topping song, "Teddy Bear", for Presley.

Lowe sometimes masqueraded as 'Harold Land'. This enabled him to be affiliated with both ASCAP and BMI.

Lowe founded Philadelphia, Pennsylvania's Cameo Records in 1956, and Cameo was later expanded into the Cameo-Parkway Records label. The owners then signed a then unknown singer, Ernest Evans, to their burgeoning label. Evans would soon change his name to Chubby Checker, whose success helped Cameo-Parkway become one of the largest independent record labels in the United States. Lowe is credited with co-writing the song "Butterfly" which helped launch and further the career of Charlie Gracie, the 1950s rock and roller, just as the term was entering into the cultural lexicon. Lowe also launched the careers of Dee Dee Sharp, Bobby Rydell, The Orlons, The Dovells, and The Tymes.

Lowe died in Wyncote, Pennsylvania, a suburb of Philadelphia, on September 1, 1993.

== Notable songs ==
- "Butterfly" – Charlie Gracie
- "Good Time Baby" – Bobby Rydell
- "Kissin' Time" – Bobby Rydell (later covered by Kiss)
- "Mashed Potato Time" – Dee Dee Sharp
- "Remember You're Mine" – Pat Boone
- "Teddy Bear" – Elvis Presley
- "Teen Age Prayer" – Gale Storm
- "We Got Love" – Bobby Rydell
- "Wild One" – Bobby Rydell
