= Cameo-Parkway Records =

American record company

- Parent company: ABKCO Records
- Founded: 1956; 70 years ago
- Founder: Bernie Lowe; Kal Mann
- Distributor: Universal Music Group
- Genre: Various
- Country of origin: U.S.
- Official website: Official site

Cameo-Parkway Records was the parent company of Cameo Records and Parkway Records, which were major American Philadelphia-based record labels from 1956 (for Cameo) and 1958 (for Parkway) to 1967. Among the types of music released were doo-wop, dance hits, popular/rock, rockabilly, big band, garage rock, soul and novelty records.

Until 1962, Cameo was also the parent company name for both labels, and Parkway was a subsidiary. In 1962, the parent company was renamed from Cameo to Cameo-Parkway, to give both labels equal status. In some foreign markets, Cameo-Parkway was also a label name, issuing records by artists from both labels. The Cameo-Parkway catalogue is currently owned by ABKCO Records.

== History ==
Cameo Records was founded in December 1956 in Philadelphia by Bernie Lowe and Kal Mann; it has no connection to the 1920s record label Cameo Records. Parkway, initially a subsidiary label, was formed in 1958.

Mann and Lowe had been a successful songwriting team prior to the start of the label, with Mann writing lyrics and Lowe the music; their biggest hit prior to starting the label was Elvis Presley's "(Let Me Be Your) Teddy Bear". Dave Appell joined the label from its inception as A&R director, and the three worked together as a production team on many early Cameo releases. Mann and Lowe wrote many of the label's early singles, while Mann and Appell also became a successful songwriting team that was responsible for many of the label's hits, particularly after Lowe cut back on his songwriting around 1961, to attend to the business of running the label. In addition, Appell's group the Applejacks functioned as Cameo's house band for the first few years, serving as backing musicians for the label's vocalists as well as issuing a handful of instrumental singles on their own. Lowe, also a musician, played piano on many early tracks.

The first hit for Cameo was "Butterfly" by Charlie Gracie, which reached No. 1 nationally in early 1957; it was also Cameo-Parkway's first of five chart-toppers. Throughout the remainder of the decade, Cameo continued to have hits by groups like the R&B group the Rays, who had a No. 3 hit with "Silhouettes" later that year (picked up from independent XYZ Records). In 1958, the label had further hits with "Dinner With Drac", a novelty record by John Zacherle in the top 10, and "Mexican Hat Rock", an instrumental by the Applejacks, in the top 20.

A major factor in Cameo-Parkway's success was its relationship with the Philadelphia-based TV program American Bandstand. Being located in the same city where this popular nationally broadcast music show was produced meant that most Cameo-Parkway artists were readily available to perform on the show—especially in the event any other act should cancel. Host and producer Dick Clark has spoken of the "warm relationship" his program had with Cameo-Parkway, and of the label's willingness to ensure that quality musical acts were always available to the program on short notice. The label benefited from the arrangement, as the exposure many Cameo-Parkway artists received on American Bandstand helped propel them to stardom.

In 1959, Bobby Rydell scored his first hits with "Kissin' Time" and "We Got Love" on Cameo. From 1960 to 1964, Rydell was the label's second largest hit maker after Chubby Checker, scoring with such hits as "Wild One" (his biggest hit, peaking at No. 2), "Swingin' School", "Volare", "The Cha-Cha-Cha", "Forget Him" and others.

Chubby Checker had a minor novelty hit in the summer of 1959 called "The Class", which featured Checker doing comic imitations of singers Fats Domino, the Coasters, Elvis Presley, drummer Cozy Cole, and Ricky Nelson, Frankie Avalon, and Fabian Forte as The Chipmunks. In 1960, Checker's cover of Hank Ballard's "The Twist" became Parkway's first big hit. Although Ballard's version only reached No. 16 on the R&B chart in 1958, Checker's version went to No. 1 in 1960, and again in early 1962. Checker had several hits, including "Pony Time" (his second No. 1), "Let's Twist Again", "The Fly", "Slow Twistin'" (with Dee Dee Sharp), "Limbo Rock", "Popeye the Hitchhiker", "Birdland" and others.

Around 1961, the Cameo and Parkway labels began developing some new stars. The vocal group the Dovells, which featured Len Barry as the lead singer, released "Bristol Stomp", which reached No. 2 in late 1961, followed by "Bristol Twistin' Annie," "(Do The New) Continental," "Hully Gully Baby" and other dance-related songs in 1962 and 1963. "You Can't Sit Down", a vocal version of the Phil Upchurch instrumental hit, was No. 35 in Cash Box magazine's year end-survey for 1963. The R&B quartet the Orlons released "The Wah-Watusi", which hit No. 2 in the summer of 1962. They had a few more top 20 hits, including "Don't Hang Up", "South Street", "Not Me" and "Crossfire!"

Fifteen-year-old Dee Dee Sharp had done a duet with Chubby Checker on "Slow Twistin'", and recorded her first solo single, "Mashed Potato Time", on the same day. It went to No. 2 in early 1962. More dance songs followed, including the follow-up "Gravy" and another dance song, "Ride!"

In mid 1963 the No. 1 hit "So Much in Love" by the Tymes marked the last hit from Cameo-Parkway's peak period.

=== UK distribution ===
In the UK, Cameo and Parkway recordings were released first on EMI's Parlophone label, then on London Records, then on Top Rank, then on EMI's Columbia label, then briefly Pye International, before finally appearing on their own Pye-distributed Cameo-Parkway label.

=== Decline and shutdown ===
In early 1964, three near-simultaneous events sent Cameo-Parkway into a sharp decline from which it would never fully recover. The first was the move of American Bandstand from Philadelphia to Los Angeles in February. Cameo-Parkway's primary source of national exposure and promotion was gone. Just as devastating (as it was to many other American labels) was the second event: the onslaught of the British Invasion in 1964/1965, which dramatically changed the tastes of the American record buying public. In a 2021 retrospective, Ken Barnes, analyzing the hit acts of 1963, noted that Cameo-Parkway acts were among the hardest hit by the Invasion, with most acts associated with them suffering permanent career damage; Barnes also cited the Bandstand move and the rise of Motown Records as other factors in Cameo-Parkway's downfall. Cameo tried to keep pace by licensing a handful of early British beat group singles, including the first two singles by the Kinks, but none made the US charts.

The third and final event was that Bernie Lowe had become increasingly disenchanted with the business side of record making and, suffering from nervous exhaustion and bouts of depression, he sold his stake in the company in 1964. Mann and Appel soon followed. By mid-1965 none of Cameo-Parkway's founding trio were associated with the label, and their biggest stars (Bobby Rydell and Chubby Checker) had also left. Cameo's new management was unable to replicate its success with artists such as Jo Ann Campbell, Maynard Ferguson, Clark Terry, the instrumental group LeRoy & His Rockin' Fellers, and Clint Eastwood and Merv Griffin.

In mid-1966, 23-year-old Neil Bogart was made the label's new head of artists and repertoire (A&R). Turning to Midwestern garage bands and orchestrated soul productions (including the distribution of Curtis Mayfield's "Windy C" label), Bogart managed to shepherd in a brief Cameo-Parkway renaissance. The last major hits for the label were "96 Tears" by Question Mark and the Mysterians (picked up from independent Pa-Go-Go Records), which went to No. 1 in late 1966, a novelty remake of "Wild Thing" by comedian Bill Minkin imitating Robert F. Kennedy under the name Senator Bobby (1966), and "Beg, Borrow and Steal" by the Ohio Express (originally on the Attack label as by The Rare Breed) (1967). Bogart also signed Bob Seger to his first recording contract, and Cameo-Parkway issued Seger's first five singles, which were all regional hits in Michigan but failed nationally.

In mid-1967, Cameo-Parkway entered into a short-lived distribution pact with MGM Records and released four more albums (two on Cameo, one on Parkway and one on Vando), and three more singles (one on Parkway and two on Vando). Cameo's final single, "Billy Sunshine" by Evie Sands (KC-2002), was originally released with the red and yellow "CP" label and then reissued with the new MGM-designated label. For the first time both label names appeared on the record labels, although neither the Cameo or Parkway name was emphasized, and the two series continued to use separate catalog numbering systems. That suggests that a gradual merger of the two labels was in progress, but it was never completed. By late 1967, after financial problems worsened, the Cameo-Parkway company was sold to Allen Klein, and renamed ABKCO Records, with Bell Records acquiring its remaining subsidiary, Vando label. Cameo Parkway Records was shut down in September 1967. Bogart went to the newly formed Buddah Records, founded by former MGM Records executive Art Kass, and brought along the former Cameo Parkway promotion staff.

== Label variations ==
=== Cameo ===
- 1957–1960: Orange label with CAMEO and "cameo" logo, both in black, at top
- 1960–1966: Red and black label with CAMEO and new "gold cameo locket" logo at left side
- 1966–1967: Red label with broken orange circle and new CAMEO "CP" logo at top
- 1967 MGM distribution label: Pink and white label with CAMEO in dark blue w/pink outline and "cameo" logo inside the "O"

Cameo albums also used the above label variations, plus:

- Early mono albums: Black label with silver print, same CAMEO and "cameo" logo as orange label singles
- Early stereo albums: Black label with gold print, same CAMEO and "cameo" logo as orange label singles

=== Parkway ===
- 1958–1960: Orange label with PARKWAY in black "jumbled" letters between two lyre logos at top
- 1960–1966: Orange and yellow label with PARKWAY RECORDS in white letters between two lyre logos at top (Some of these labels do not include the lyres)
- 1966–1967: Yellow label with a broken orange octagon and the new PARKWAY "CP" logo at top
- 1967 MGM distribution label: brown label with new "Parkway" logo at top. The logo includes a large black letter "P" with white arrow inside its perimeter, resembling a highway.

Parkway albums also used all of the above label variations

== Subsidiary labels ==
Wyncote Records was a budget label started in 1964. It released compilation albums of material by Cameo and Parkway artists as well as new albums of soundtrack and easy listening music. These records were mainly distributed in drug, book and department stores, usually through rack jobbers.

Other related labels, mostly independently owned but distributed by Cameo-Parkway, included

- Audio Arts!: The first two singles were released under Cameo/Parkway before the label was sold to Amy / Mala / Bell
- Chariot: At least five singles were released under Cameo/Parkway before the label was sold to Amy / Mala / Bell
- Cheltenham: At least four singles released from 1965–1966
- Cotton: At least three singles released in 1962
- Fairmount, featuring Lonnie Youngblood: At least 27 singles have been released on this label
- Ivanhoe: At least one single was distributed under Cameo/Parkway
- Key-Loc: At least one single was distributed under Cameo/Parkway by Sunny and the Sunliners
- Lucky Eleven, based in Flint, Michigan, featuring Terry Knight and the Pack, which eventually transformed into Grand Funk Railroad
- Sentar: Owned by the families of pop group the New Colony Six (the label's only group), four singles and one album were released under Sentar's Cameo/Parkway distribution
- Showplace, featuring the Yellow Payges (at least two singles distributed)
- Tomorrow: Originally distributed by Atco, then by Cameo/Parkway. At least two singles were distributed under C/P
- Vando: Owned by Van McCoy, five singles and one album were released under the label's C/P distribution, mostly by Chris Bartley
- Winchester: Only two singles were released under this label, one by the Tymes and the other by the Spokesmen
- Windy C: Owned by Curtis Mayfield, eight singles and one album were released on this label, mostly by the Five Stairsteps

=== Philadelphia connection ===
Several C/P labels were based on hometown suburbs, highways and landmarks, including...

- Parkway: Benjamin Franklin Parkway
- Fairmount: Fairmount Park; there is also a Fairmount Ave. north of the Philadelphia Museum of Art
- Wyncote: Northern suburb of Philadelphia where C/P founder Bernie Lowe resided and set up office for C/P
- Cheltenham: Cheltenham Avenue; there is also a Cheltenham High School in suburban Wyncote

== Reissues ==
ABKCO reissued Cameo-Parkway recordings in the early 1970s, but allowed them to fall out of print after that time. Virtually all Cameo-Parkway recordings, including all of their numerous chart hits, were officially unavailable in any format for about 30 years, from 1975 to 2005. In May 2005 ABKCO revived the Cameo-Parkway name for reissues only, and released a multi-CD box set of the labels' most notable output: Cameo-Parkway: 1957-1967. In October 2005 it began to issue various single-artist "best of" CD compilations, including Charlie Gracie, Bobby Rydell, Chubby Checker, Dee Dee Sharp, the Dovells, the Orlons, the Tymes and Question Mark & the Mysterians. A variety of artists' CD titled Cameo-Parkway: The Greatest Hits was also issued, as well as two digital-only compilations: Holiday Hits From Cameo Parkway and Original Northern Soul Hits From Cameo Parkway.

ABKCO has also begun to license its repertoire out to other labels, allowing Universal Music Group to license some songs for its Complete Introduction to Northern Soul box set in 2008, and allowing Collectors' Choice Music to reissue several albums in 2010. Despite these reissues, many more obscure Cameo-Parkway recordings, and even a few of their lesser hits, remain unavailable.

== See also ==
- List of record labels
