= Kal Mann =

American rock and roll lyricist (1917–2001)

- Born: Kalman Cohen; May 6, 1917; Philadelphia, Pennsylvania, U.S.
- Died: November 28, 2001 (aged 84) Pompano Beach, Florida, U.S.
- Genres: Rock and roll; popular music
- Occupations: Lyricist; songwriter
- Years active: 1950s–1960s

Kal Mann (born Kalman Cohen; May 6, 1917 – November 28, 2001) was an American lyricist. He is best known for penning the words to Elvis Presley's "Teddy Bear", plus "Butterfly", a hit for both Charlie Gracie and Andy Williams, and "Let's Twist Again", sung by Chubby Checker, which won the 1962 Grammy Award for Best Rock & Roll Recording.

== Biography ==
Born in Philadelphia, Pennsylvania, Mann began his career in entertainment as a comedy writer for Danny Thomas and Red Buttons, until a friend, songwriter Bernie Lowe, encouraged him to try writing lyrics for the music industry. Mann co-wrote songs with Lowe and Dave Appell, yielding a number of major rock and roll hits such as Charlie Gracie's "Butterfly," which sold more than two million copies and also become a million seller for the crooner, Andy Williams, and also a minor hit for Bob Carroll, whose cover version peaked at #61. In addition he co-wrote Elvis Presley's "Teddy Bear," Bobby Rydell's "Wild One" and "The Cha-Cha-Cha", and Chubby Checker's "Let's Twist Again" and "Limbo Rock." Mann wrote a number of songs for Checker, including "Popeye the Hitchhiker" and "Slow Twistin'" plus Pat Boone's "Remember You're Mine", and the much covered "You Can't Sit Down". He also wrote "Bristol Stomp" for The Dovells with David Appell.

"Fabulous", another Charlie Gracie track (and in 1999 covered by Paul McCartney) sold nearly one million copies upon release.

Some songs such as "Limbo Rock" were credited under the pseudonym of Jon Sheldon. This enabled him to be affiliated with both ASCAP and BMI.

== Record label ==
Mann and Lowe teamed up to form Cameo-Parkway Records in 1956.

== Death ==
Kal Mann died in 2001 from Alzheimer's disease, at the age of 84.
