= List of Billboard Hot 100 top-ten singles in 1962 =

This is a list of singles that have peaked in the top 10 of the Billboard Hot 100 during 1962.

Elvis Presley, Chubby Checker, Ray Charles, Dion, and Connie Francis each had four top-ten hits in 1962, tying them for the most top-ten hits during the year.

== Top-ten singles ==
- (#) – 1962 Year-end top 10 single position and rank

Top ten entry date	Single	Artist(s)	Peak	Peak date	Weeks in top ten
Singles from 1961
December 4	"The Twist" (#9)	Chubby Checker	1	January 13	13
December 11	"Happy Birthday, Sweet Sixteen"	Neil Sedaka	6	January 6	6
December 18	"Peppermint Twist - Part 1"	Joey Dee and the Starliters	1	January 27	11
December 25	"Can't Help Falling in Love"	Elvis Presley	2	February 3	8
Singles from 1962
January 6	"When I Fall in Love"	The Lettermen	7	January 27	3
January 6	"Unchain My Heart"	Ray Charles	9	January 13	2
January 13	"I Know (You Don't Love Me No More)"	Barbara George	3	January 27	6
January 13	"When the Boy in Your Arms"	Connie Francis	10	January 13	1
January 20	"Norman"	Sue Thompson	3	February 24	7
January 27	"The Wanderer"	Dion	2	February 24	7
January 27	"Baby It's You"	The Shirelles	8	February 3	2
February 3	"Duke of Earl"	Gene Chandler	1	February 17	8
February 3	"Break It to Me Gently"	Brenda Lee	4	March 3	7
February 10	"A Little Bitty Tear"	Burl Ives	9	February 10	2
February 10	"Dear Lady Twist"	Gary U.S. Bonds	9	February 24	3
February 17	"Crying in the Rain"	The Everly Brothers	6	March 3	5
February 24	"Hey! Baby"	Bruce Channel	1	March 10	8
March 3	"Midnight in Moscow"	Kenny Ball and His Jazzmen	2	March 17	7
March 3	"Chip Chip"	Gene McDaniels	10	March 3	1
March 10	"Don't Break the Heart That Loves You"	Connie Francis	1	March 31	6
March 10	"Let Me In" (#8)	The Sensations	4	March 17	4
March 10	"Her Royal Majesty"	James Darren	6	March 17	3
March 10	"What's Your Name"	Don and Juan	7	March 17	4
March 17	"Percolator (Twist)"	Billy Joe and the Checkmates	10	March 17	1
March 24	"Dream Baby"	Roy Orbison	4	March 31	3
March 24	"Slow Twistin'"	Chubby Checker	3	April 14	7
March 24	"Twistin' the Night Away"	Sam Cooke	9	March 24	2
March 31	"Johnny Angel" (#6)	Shelley Fabares	1	April 7	9
March 31	"Good Luck Charm"	Elvis Presley	1	April 21	7
April 7	"Young World"	Rick Nelson	5	April 21	4
April 7	"Love Letters"	Ketty Lester	5	April 14	3
April 7	"Mashed Potato Time" (#3)	Dee Dee Sharp	2	May 5	9
April 14	"Lover Please"	Clyde McPhatter	7	April 21	4
April 21	"Soldier Boy" (#10)	The Shirelles	1	May 5	8
April 21	"Shout"	Joey Dee and the Starliters	6	May 5	4
April 21	"Stranger on the Shore" (#1)	Mr. Acker Bilk	1	May 26	11
April 28	"Twist, Twist Senora"	Gary U.S. Bonds	9	May 12	3
May 5	"P.T. 109"	Jimmy Dean	8	May 26	3
May 12	"She Cried"	Jay and the Americans	5	May 19	3
May 12	"Old Rivers"	Walter Brennan	5	May 26	4
May 12	"Shout! Shout! (Knock Yourself Out)"	Ernie Maresca	6	May 19	3
May 19	"Everybody Loves Me But You"	Brenda Lee	6	May 26	3
May 19	"Funny Way of Laughin'"	Burl Ives	10	May 19	1
May 26	"I Can't Stop Loving You" (#2)	Ray Charles	1	June 2	11
May 26	"Lovers Who Wander"	Dion	3	June 9	4
June 2	"The One Who Really Loves You"	Mary Wells	8	June 9	3
June 2	"(The Man Who Shot) Liberty Valance"	Gene Pitney	4	June 16	5
June 9	"It Keeps Right on A-Hurtin'"	Johnny Tillotson	3	June 16	6
June 9	"Second Hand Love"	Connie Francis	7	June 9	3
June 9	"Palisades Park"	Freddy Cannon	3	June 23	7
June 9	"Playboy"	The Marvelettes	7	June 23	5
June 16	"The Stripper" (#5)	David Rose and His Orchestra	1	July 7	9
June 23	"Cindy's Birthday"	Johnny Crawford	8	June 23	2
June 23	"That's Old Fashioned"	The Everly Brothers	9	June 23	1
June 30	"Roses Are Red (My Love)" (#4)	Bobby Vinton	1	July 14	10
June 30	"Al Di La"	Emilio Pericoli	6	July 7	3
July 7	"Wolverton Mountain"	Claude King	6	July 21	4
July 7	"Snap Your Fingers"	Joe Henderson	8	July 7	1
July 7	"Johnny Get Angry"	Joanie Sommers	7	July 21	2
July 14	"The Wah-Watusi"	The Orlons	2	July 21	6
July 14	"Sealed with a Kiss"	Brian Hyland	3	July 28	6
July 14	"Gravy (For My Mashed Potatoes)"	Dee Dee Sharp	9	July 14	3
July 21	"Speedy Gonzales"	Pat Boone	6	July 28	5
July 28	"Breaking Up Is Hard to Do"	Neil Sedaka	1	August 11	7
July 28	"Ahab the Arab"	Ray Stevens	5	August 4	5
August 4	"The Loco-Motion" (#7)	Little Eva	1	August 25	7
August 4	"Theme from Dr. Kildare (Three Stars Will Shine Tonight)"	Richard Chamberlain	10	August 4	1
August 11	"You'll Lose a Good Thing"	Barbara Lynn	8	August 11	1
August 11	"Things"	Bobby Darin	3	August 25	5
August 18	"You Don't Know Me"	Ray Charles	2	September 8	5
August 18	"Little Diane"	Dion	8	August 18	3
August 25	"Sheila"	Tommy Roe	1	September 1	6
August 25	"Party Lights"	Claudine Clark	5	September 1	3
August 25	"She's Not You"	Elvis Presley	5	September 8	5
September 1	"Vacation"	Connie Francis	9	September 1	2
September 8	"Ramblin' Rose"	Nat "King" Cole	2	September 22	8
September 8	"Teen Age Idol"	Rick Nelson	5	September 22	4
September 15	"Sherry"	The Four Seasons	1	September 15	7
September 15	"Green Onions"	Booker T. & the M.G.'s	3	September 29	6
September 15	"Patches"	Dickey Lee	6	October 6	7
September 15	"Rinky Dink"	Dave "Baby" Cortez	10	September 15	1
September 22	"Let's Dance"	Chris Montez	4	October 6	5
September 22	"You Belong to Me"	The Duprees	7	September 22	2
September 22	"You Beat Me to the Punch"	Mary Wells	9	September 22	2
September 29	"Monster Mash"	Bobby "Boris" Pickett and the Crypt-Kickers	1	October 20	7
September 29	"Alley Cat"	Bent Fabric	7	September 29	3
October 6	"Venus in Blue Jeans"	Jimmy Clanton	7	October 6	1
October 6	"I Remember You"	Frank Ifield	5	October 13	4
October 13	"Do You Love Me"	The Contours	3	October 20	5
October 13	"If I Had a Hammer"	Peter, Paul and Mary	10	October 13	1
October 20	"He's a Rebel"	The Crystals	1	November 3	7
October 20	"Only Love Can Break a Heart"	Gene Pitney	2	November 3	4
October 27	"All Alone Am I"	Brenda Lee	3	November 10	7
October 27	"Gina"	Johnny Mathis	6	November 17	5
November 3	"Big Girls Don't Cry"	The Four Seasons	1	November 17	10
November 3	"Limbo Rock"	Chubby Checker	2	December 22	12
November 3	"Next Door to an Angel"	Neil Sedaka	5	November 17	5
November 3	"Return to Sender"	Elvis Presley	2	November 17	10
November 10	"Popeye the Hitchhiker"	Chubby Checker	10	November 10	1
November 17	"Bobby's Girl"	Marcie Blane	3	December 1	8
November 17	"Don't Hang Up"	The Orlons	4	December 8	6
November 17	"The Cha-Cha-Cha"	Bobby Rydell	10	November 17	1
November 24	"Ride!"	Dee Dee Sharp	5	December 8	4
December 1	"The Lonely Bull"	The Tijuana Brass	6	December 8	3
December 8	"Telstar"	The Tornados	1	December 22	8
December 8	"Release Me"	"Little Esther" Phillips	8	December 22	4
December 22	"You Are My Sunshine"	Ray Charles	7	December 29	2
December 22	"Love Came to Me"	Dion	10	December 22	1

=== 1961 peaks ===
List of Billboard Hot 100 top ten singles in 1962 which peaked in 1961
Top ten entry date	Single	Artist(s)	Peak	Peak date	Weeks in top ten
November 20	"Goodbye Cruel World"	James Darren	3	December 4	7
December 4	"Walk on By"	Leroy Van Dyke	5	December 11	8
December 11	"The Lion Sleeps Tonight"	The Tokens	1	December 18	8
December 11	"Run to Him"	Bobby Vee	2	December 25	6

=== 1963 peaks ===
List of Billboard Hot 100 top ten singles in 1962 which peaked in 1963
Top ten entry date	Single	Artist(s)	Peak	Peak date	Weeks in top ten
December 15	"Go Away Little Girl"	Steve Lawrence	1	January 12	9
December 29	"Hotel Happiness"	Brook Benton	3	January 19	4
December 29	"Zip-a-Dee-Doo-Dah"	Bob B. Soxx & the Blue Jeans	8	January 12	3

== See also ==
- 1962 in music
- List of Billboard Hot 100 number ones of 1962
- Billboard Year-End Hot 100 singles of 1962
