= Billboard Year-End Hot 100 singles of 1962 =

Ranking of recorded music

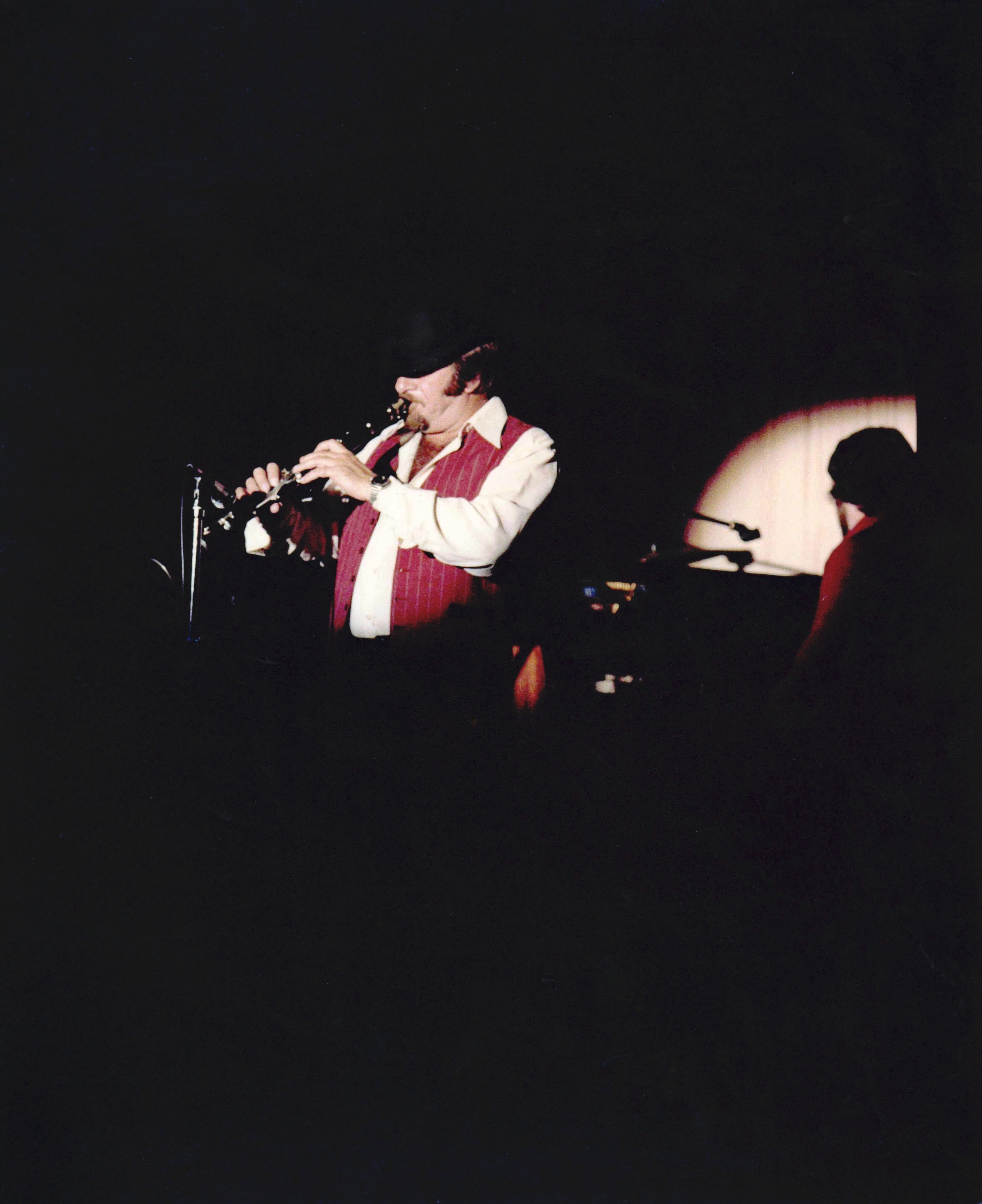
"Stranger on the Shore" by Acker Bilk was the number one song of 1962.

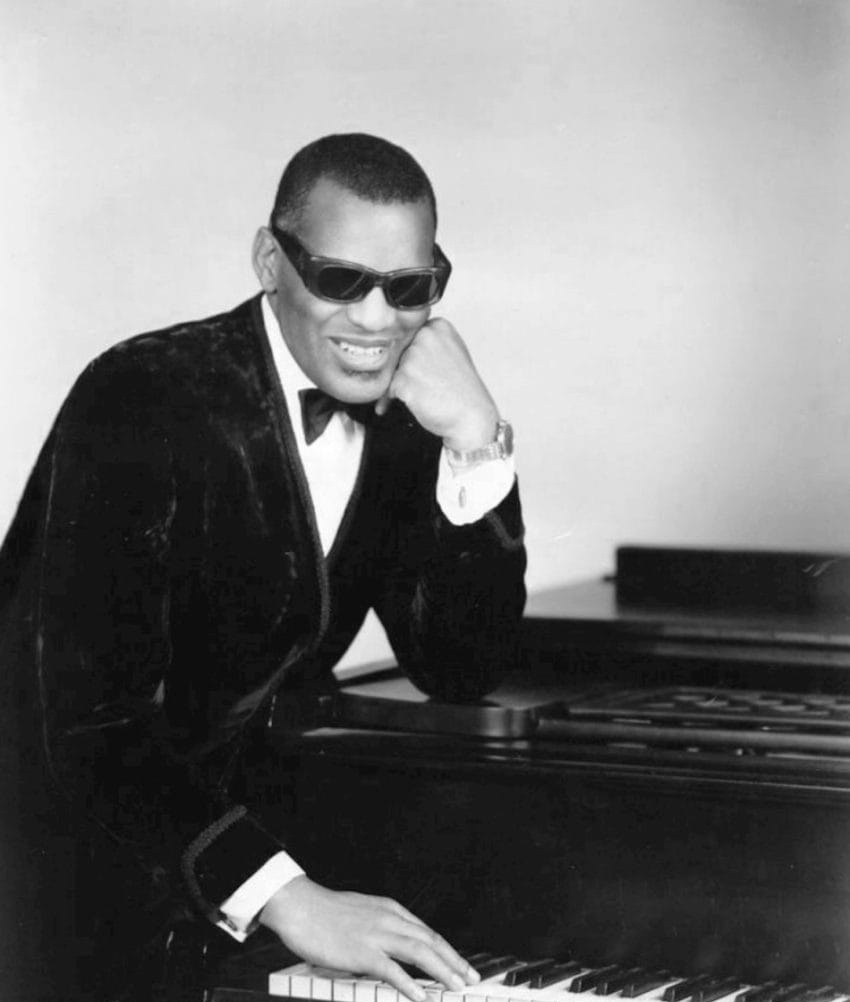
Ray Charles had three songs on the Year-End Hot 100.

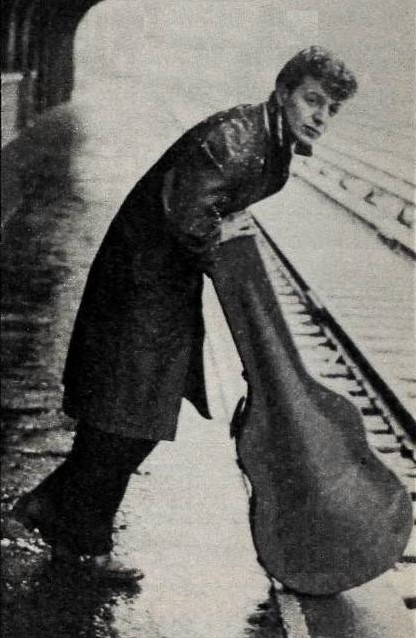
Dion had three songs on the Year-End Hot 100.

This is a list of Billboard magazine's Top Hot 100 songs of 1962. The Top 100, as revealed in the year-end edition of Billboard dated December 29, 1962, is based on Hot 100 charts from the issue dates of January 1 through October 31, 1962.

| № | Title | Artist(s) |
|---|---|---|
| 1 | "Stranger on the Shore" | Acker Bilk |
| 2 | "I Can't Stop Loving You" | Ray Charles |
| 3 | "Mashed Potato Time" | Dee Dee Sharp |
| 4 | "Roses Are Red (My Love)" | Bobby Vinton |
| 5 | "The Stripper" | David Rose |
| 6 | "Johnny Angel" | Shelley Fabares |
| 7 | "The Loco-Motion" | Little Eva |
| 8 | "Let Me In" | The Sensations |
| 9 | "The Twist" | Chubby Checker |
| 10 | "Soldier Boy" | The Shirelles |
| 11 | "Hey! Baby" | Bruce Channel |
| 12 | "The Wanderer" | Dion |
| 13 | "Duke of Earl" | Gene Chandler |
| 14 | "Palisades Park" | Freddy Cannon |
| 15 | "Breaking Up Is Hard to Do" | Neil Sedaka |
| 16 | "Wolverton Mountain" | Claude King |
| 17 | "Slow Twistin'" | Chubby Checker & Dee Dee Sharp |
| 18 | "It Keeps Right On a-Hurtin'" | Johnny Tillotson |
| 19 | "The One Who Really Loves You" | Mary Wells |
| 20 | "Good Luck Charm" | Elvis Presley |
| 21 | "Midnight in Moscow" | Kenny Ball |
| 22 | "Sheila" | Tommy Roe |
| 23 | "Twistin' the Night Away" | Sam Cooke |
| 24 | "The Wah-Watusi" | The Orlons |
| 25 | "Peppermint Twist" | Joey Dee and the Starliters |
| 26 | "Break It to Me Gently" | Brenda Lee |
| 27 | "Playboy" | The Marvelettes |
| 28 | "Ramblin' Rose" | Nat King Cole |
| 29 | "Sealed with a Kiss" | Brian Hyland |
| 30 | "She Cried" | Jay and the Americans |
| 31 | "Don't Break the Heart That Loves You" | Connie Francis |
| 32 | "Dear Lady Twist" | Gary U.S. Bonds |
| 33 | "Norman" | Sue Thompson |
| 34 | "Love Letters" | Ketty Lester |
| 35 | "Party Lights" | Claudine Clark |
| 36 | "Cotton Fields" | The Highwaymen |
| 37 | "Alley Cat" | Bent Fabric |
| 38 | "Twist and Shout" | The Isley Brothers |
| 39 | "Theme from Dr. Kildare (Three Stars Will Shine Tonight)" | Richard Chamberlain |
| 40 | "Tuff" | Ace Cannon |
| 41 | "Lover Please" | Clyde McPhatter |
| 42 | "I Know (You Don't Love Me No More)" | Barbara George |
| 43 | "Young World" | Ricky Nelson |
| 44 | "Baby It's You" | The Shirelles |
| 45 | "Speedy Gonzales" | Pat Boone |
| 46 | "A Little Bitty Tear" | Burl Ives |
| 47 | "Crying in the Rain" | The Everly Brothers |
| 48 | "Al di là" | Emilio Pericoli |
| 49 | "Shout! Shout! (Knock Yourself Out)" | Ernie Maresca |
| 50 | "What's Your Name" | Don and Juan |
| 51 | "Smoky Places" | The Corsairs |
| 52 | "Having a Party" | Sam Cooke |
| 53 | "Green Onions" | Booker T. & the M.G.'s |
| 54 | "You Don't Know Me" | Ray Charles |
| 55 | "Sherry" | The Four Seasons |
| 56 | "Johnny Get Angry" | Joanie Sommers |
| 57 | "Can't Help Falling in Love" | Elvis Presley |
| 58 | "Shout" | Joey Dee and the Starliters |
| 59 | "Rinky Dink" | Dave "Baby" Cortez |
| 60 | "Moon River" | Henry Mancini |
| 61 | "Ahab the Arab" | Ray Stevens |
| 62 | "Things" | Bobby Darin |
| 63 | "(The Man Who Shot) Liberty Valance" | Gene Pitney |
| 64 | "You Belong to Me" | The Duprees |
| 65 | "Dream Baby (How Long Must I Dream)" | Roy Orbison |
| 66 | "Snap Your Fingers" | Joe Henderson |
| 67 | "Lovers Who Wander" | Dion |
| 68 | "Let's Dance" | Chris Montez |
| 69 | "Cindy's Birthday" | Johnny Crawford |
| 70 | "You Beat Me to the Punch" | Mary Wells |
| 71 | "You'll Lose a Good Thing" | Barbara Lynn |
| 72 | "Uptown" | The Crystals |
| 73 | "Everybody Loves Me But You" | Brenda Lee |
| 74 | "Patches" | Dickey Lee |
| 75 | "Venus in Blue Jeans" | Jimmy Clanton |
| 76 | "Love Me Warm and Tender" | Paul Anka |
| 77 | "Teen Age Idol" | Rick Nelson |
| 78 | "She's Got You" | Patsy Cline |
| 79 | "Dear One" | Larry Finnegan |
| 80 | "Her Royal Majesty" | James Darren |
| 81 | "Old Rivers" | Walter Brennan |
| 82 | "Funny Way of Laughin'" | Burl Ives |
| 83 | "A Swingin' Safari" | Billy Vaughn |
| 84 | "Tell Me" | Dick and Dee Dee |
| 85 | "PT-109" | Jimmy Dean |
| 86 | "Little Diane" | Dion |
| 87 | "Percolator (Twist)" | Billy Joe and the Checkmates |
| 88 | "Twist, Twist Senora" | Gary U.S. Bonds |
| 89 | "Twistin' Matilda" | Jimmy Soul |
| 90 | "Gravy (For My Mashed Potatoes)" | Dee Dee Sharp |
| 91 | "Walk on the Wild Side" | Jimmy Smith |
| 92 | "Soul Twist" | King Curtis |
| 93 | "I'll Never Dance Again" | Bobby Rydell |
| 94 | "I'm Blue (The Gong-Gong Song)" | The Ikettes |
| 95 | "Where Have All the Flowers Gone?" | The Kingston Trio |
| 96 | "(Girls, Girls, Girls) Made to Love" | Eddie Hodges |
| 97 | "Town Without Pity" | Gene Pitney |
| 98 | "If I Had a Hammer" | Peter, Paul and Mary |
| 99 | "I Wish That We Were Married" | Ronnie & the Hi-Lites |
| 100 | "Surfin' Safari" | The Beach Boys |

== See also ==
- 1962 in music
- List of Billboard Hot 100 number-one singles of 1962
- List of Billboard Hot 100 top-ten singles in 1962
