= List of twist songs =

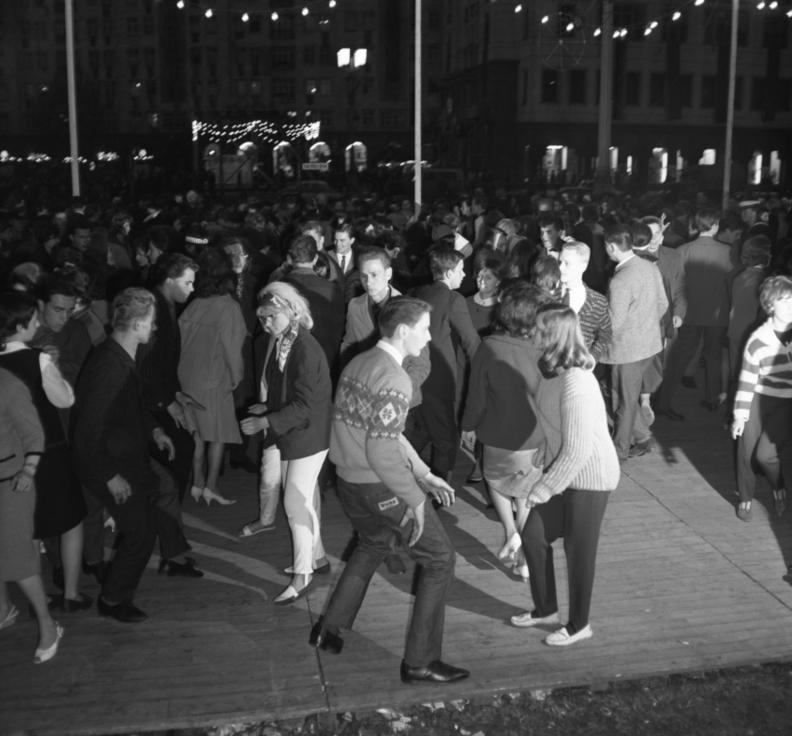
Dancing the Twist, East Berlin, 17 May 1964

The following songs, in alphabetical order by year, are associated with the dance "The Twist" and the associated cultural craze:

== 1959 ==
- "The Twist" (Hank Ballard) – originally released by Hank Ballard and the Midnighters as a B-side, but going to No. 1 in the US upon being covered by Chubby Checker (released 1959, charted in 1960 and 1962), who would become the artist most associated with the Twist phenomenon. The song was subsequently covered numerous times, often by Checker himself, including a duet with the Fat Boys in 1988.

== 1960 ==
- "Kissin' and Twistin'" (Don Kirshner-Al Nevins) – Fabian
- "Teen Twist" – Buddy Miller (Doyle Stone)
- "Twistin' The Night Away" – Sam Cooke
- "Twistin' USA" (Kal Mann) – Danny and the Juniors, released as a b-side by Chubby Checker in 1961.

== 1961 ==
- "Dear Lady Twist" (Frank Guida) – Gary "U.S." Bonds
- "Florida Twist" (Caruso-Pomilli) – Bill Haley & His Comets
- "Let's Twist Again" (Kal Mann and Dave Appell) – Chubby Checker
- "Mama Don't Want No Twistin'" (H. Glover-C. Vaccaro) – Jo Ann Campbell
- "Oliver Twist"/"Celebrity Twist" (Gladys Shelley-Rod McKuen) – Rod McKuen
- "Peppermint Twist" (Joey Dee-Henry Glover) – Joey Dee and the Starliters, reached No. 1 in the US (displacing Chubby Checker's "The Twist"), subsequently covered by Sweet in 1974.
- "The Peppermint Twist (Danny Lamego) - Danny Peppermint and The Jumping Jacks Reached Billboard #54 in December 1961.
- "Rock-A-Hula Baby ("Twist" Special)"" (Wise, Weisman, Fuller) – Elvis Presley
- "Spanish Twist" (Bradford) – Bill Haley & His Comets; released as a B-side by the Isley Brothers in 1962; also known as "Twist Español" on some international releases.
- "Twist All Night" – Louie Prima
- "Umgowa Twist" – The Ravens
- "Xmas Twist" – The Twistin’ Kings
- "Merry Twist-Mas" - The Marcels
- "Tequila Twist" (Chuck Rio) – The Champs
- "Twist and Shout" (Phil Medley-Bert Russell) – originally recorded by the Top Notes, then covered by the Isley Brothers in 1962 and the Beatles in 1963 (with John Lennon on the lead vocals); followed by numerous subsequent cover versions.

Note: These last two are compound sequel songs, with "Tequila Twist" serving not only as a sequel to "The Twist", but also as a sequel to the Champs' 1958 hit "Tequila", and "Twist and Shout" serving as a sequel to both "The Twist" and the Isley Brothers' 1959 hit "Shout".

== 1962 ==
- "The Alvin Twist" (Ross Bagdasarian, Sr.) – The Chipmunks
- "Arkansas Twist" (B.L. Trammell) – Bobby Lee Trammell
- "The Basie Twist" (Benny Carter) – Count Basie
- "Big Bo's Twist" (W. Thomas) – Big Bo and the Arrows
- "Bristol Twistin' Annie" (Lewis-Styles) – The Dovells (No. 27)
- "Do You Know How To Twist?" (Ballard-Redd-Nath) – Hank Ballard and the Midnighters (No. 87)
- "Everybody's Twistin'" (Koehler-Bloom) – Frank Sinatra (originally released as "Ev'rybody's Twistin'")
- "Double Twist" (Freddy Fowell, Derry Wilkie) – Howie Casey & The Seniors
- "Dry Bones Twist" (Rudy Toombs) – The Drivers
- "Hey, Let's Twist" (Glover-Dee-Levy) – Joey Dee & the Starliters (No. 20)
- "Jungle Twist" (Miller-Jackson) – Camil & Sylvia
- "La Leçon De Twist" (Danyel Gérard, Lucien Morisse, Giuseppe Mengozzi) – Dalida (France release)
- "La Leçon Du Twist" and "Le twist du canotier" were released in 1962 by French rock and roll band Les Chaussettes Noires
- "Let Me Do My Twist" (Henry Glover-Joey Dee-Morris Levy) – Jo Ann Campbell with Joey Dee & The Starliters
- "Mama Don't Allow No Twistin' Here" (Connie St. John)/"Twistin' At The Waldorf" (D. Meehan) – Don Meehan
- "Mama Don't Allow No Twistin'" – Barbara Dane (no songwriter credit; "Arranged and Adapted by Barbara Dane" on label)
- "Mister Twister" (C. Mapel), "Teach Me How to Twist" (E. Curtis), and "Kissin' Twist (Kiss 'n' Twist)" (Michael Canosa) – Connie Francis (multiple international releases) - all from her album Do the Twist!
- "Muleskinner Twist" – (Rodgers) Ray Kannon & The Corals
- "Oliver Twist" (Gladys Shelley, Rod McKuen) – Rod McKuen
- "Percolator (Twist)" (Bideau-Freeman) – Billy Joe & the Checkmates (No. 10)
- "Pop'eye Twist" (Caddy) – The Tornados
- "Raunchy Twist" (Justice, Manker) – The G-Men
- "Santa's Doing The Horizontal Twist" (Jess Hotchkiss) – Kay Martin
- "Sister Twister" (Otis Blackwell) – Carl Perkins
- "Slow Twistin'" (Jon Sheldon)/"La Paloma Twist" (Kal Mann) – Chubby Checker (Dee Dee Sharp credited on "Slow Twistin'" on album version only)
- "Soul Twist" – King Curtis
- "Transylvania Twist" (B. Pickett, G. Paxton & J. MacRae) – Bobby (Boris) Pickett and The Crypt-Kickers
- "Twist Enos Twist" (J. Testa, H. York) – The Page-Boys
- "Twist Fever" (Alan O'Day) – Arch Hall, Jr. & the Archers (appeared in the 1962 film Wild Guitar, but remained unreleased as a recording until appearing on the 2005 album of the same name; also on the album was "Guitar Twist" (also written by O'Day).)
- "Twist Lackawanna" (Walker, Fuqua, White) – Jr. Walker
- "Twist-Her" (B. Black) – Bill Black's Combo (No. 26)
- "Twist, Twist Senora" (Anderson-Barge-Guida) – Gary U.S. Bonds
- "Twistin' All Night Long" (Slay-Crewe) – Danny and the Juniors with Freddy Cannon
- "When The Saints Go Twistin' In" – Danny and the Juniors
- "Twistin' and Kissin'" (M. Weiss-E. Lewis) – Ronnie & the Hi-Lites
- "Twistin' Postman" (Bateman-Holland-Stevens) – The Marvelettes
  Note: This record also served as a compound sequel, referencing not only "The Twist", but also the Marvellettes' 1961 number-one hit "Please, Mr. Postman"
- "Twistin' Matilda (and the Channel)" (Norman Span) – Jimmy Soul (No. 22)
- "Twistin' the Night Away" – written and originally released by Sam Cooke (No. 9), with a charting cover by Rod Stewart (No. 59, 1973 and 1987) and additional covers by the Marvelettes (1962) and Divine (1985)
- "Twistin' with Linda" (R. Isley-R. Isley-O. Isley) – The Isley Brothers
- "Twisting Bells" (Farina-Farina-Farina) – Santo and Johnny
- "Twisting in the Jungle" (Earl Gary-Van Aloda)/"Twistology" – Buddy Bow (Belgium release)
- "Twisting Time" – King Curtis
- "Twisting with the King" – King Curtis
- "Whole Lotta Twistin' Goin' On" (Dave "Curlee" Williams, Big Ed Hoyt) – Jerry Lee Lewis
- "Land of 1000 Dances" originally released in 1962 by Chris Kenner mentions the twist as well as other 50's & 60's popular dances. Most famously covered by Wilson Pickett in 1966.

== 1963 ==
- "Do the Twist" (Dale Hawkins) – The Isley Brothers (from the album Twisting and Shouting)
- "Home on the Range Twist"/"Spaghetti Twist" – The Fortune Tellers (Japan release)
- "Twist It Up" (K. Mann-D. Appell) – Chubby Checker
- "Twist Train (Night Train)" (Washington, Lipkins, J. Forest) – The Brain Twist
- "The Twister" (E. McDaniel) – Bo Diddley (UK release)
- "Twisting & Shaking" – (J. T. Ratliff) J. T. Ratliff
- "Wesoły Twist (The Gay Twist)" (F. Leszczyńska, H. Rostworowski) – Helena Majdaniec (Poland release)

== 1964–present ==
- "Whole Lotta Twistin'" – Professor Longhair 1959–62 (date range of reissues on 1995's New Orleans Twist Party)
- "Ai Ai Twist" – Tan Sri P. Ramlee (1965)
- "Your Sister Can't Twist (But She Can Rock 'n Roll)" – Elton John (1973)
- "Success" – Iggy Pop (1977) [Lyrics "I'm gonna do the twist (I'm gonna do the twist)"]
- "Baby, Let's Twist" – The Dictators (1978)
- "I Won't Be Twisting This Christmas" – Father Guido Sarducci (1980)
- "Twist & Crawl" – The Beat (1980)
- “The Twist” - Klaus Nomi (1981)
- "Twisting by the Pool" – Dire Straits (1983)
- "Twisting" – They Might Be Giants (1990)
- "The Wilbury Twist" – The Traveling Wilburys (1991)
- "Aneurysm" – Nirvana (1991)
- "Ultra Twist" – The Cramps (1994)
- "Can You (Point Your Fingers and Do the Twist?)" – The Wiggles (1995)
- "Twist" - Korn (1996)
- "Bomb the Twist" – The 5.6.7.8's (1996)
- "Twist" – Phish (2000)
- "The Denial Twist" – The White Stripes (2005)
- "Then I Go Twisting" – Erasure (2011)
- "Gummy Twist" - Gummibär (2015)

== Dance litany songs ==
Several pop songs have referenced the Twist among several other songs, sometimes calling on listeners/dancers to change their dance step when the singer calls out the name of a different dance.

- "Do You Love Me" – The Contours (1962). Covered by The Dave Clark Five (1964) and many others.
- "Land of a Thousand Dances" – Chris Kenner (1963). Covered by many acts, including most notably by Cannibal & the Headhunters (1965) and Wilson Picket (1967).
- "Papa's Got a Brand New Bag" – James Brown (1965)
- "Do the Strand" – Roxy Music (1973)
- "Shake a Tail Feather" – Ray Charles (1980). While listed above as a song that merely references "The Twist", the Charles version that he performed in the 1980 film The Blues Brothers added additional lyrics in which Charles additionally calls for the Twist, the Monkey, the Frug and the Mashed Potato, to be performed by a crowd gathered outside Ray's Music Exchange.

== See also ==
- Twist (dance)#Twist hits on Billboard
- The Continental Twist (1961)
- Twist Around the Clock (1961)
- Hey, Let's Twist! (1961)
- Don't Knock the Twist (1962)
