= Show Time (Ry Cooder album) =

- Cover of the original US pressing, 1977

Live album by Ry Cooder
- Released: January 1977
- Recorded: 14–15 December 1976
- Venue: The Great American Music Hall, San Francisco, California
- Genre: Americana, roots rock, blues, country, Tex-Mex
- Length: 43:04
- Label: Warner Bros.
- Producer: Ry Cooder

Ry Cooder chronology
Chicken Skin Music (1976)	Show Time (1977)	Jazz (1978)

Alternate cover
- The alternative cover used on subsequent reissues

Professional ratings
Review scores
Source	Rating
Allmusic	3.5/5 stars

Show Time is the sixth album and first live album by guitarist Ry Cooder, produced by Cooder and released on the Warner Bros. record label in January 1977.

== Track listing ==
Side A

1. "School Is Out" (Frank Guida, Gary Anderson, Gene Barge, Joseph Royster) – 2:37
2. "Alimony" (Brenda Lee Jones, Robert Higginbotham, Welton Young) – 4:44
3. "Jesus on the Mainline" (Traditional; adapted by Ry Cooder) – 5:27
4. "The Dark End of the Street" (Chips Moman, Dan Penn) – 6:43

Side B

1. "Viva Seguin/Do Re Mi" (Santiago Jiménez, Woody Guthrie) – 5:24
2. "Volver, Volver" (Ray Maldonado) – 4:49
3. "How Can a Poor Man Stand Such Times and Live?" (Blind Alfred Reed) – 6:40
4. "Smack Dab in the Middle" (Charles E. Calhoun) – 8:00

== Personnel ==
=== Musicians ===
- Ry Cooder – electric guitar, vocals, arrangements
- Flaco Jiménez – accordion
- Bobby King – vocals
- Terry Evans – vocals
- Eldridge King – vocals
- Pat Rizzo – alto saxophone
- Jesse Ponce – bajo sexto
- Henry "Big Red" Ojeda – bass
- Isaac Garcia – drums
