= Playing for Keeps =

Playing for Keeps may refer to:

== Film and television ==
- Playing for Keeps (1986 film), a comedy film by Bob and Harvey Weinstein
- Playing for Keeps (2012 film), a romantic comedy film starring Gerard Butler
- Playing for Keeps (TV series), an Australian drama TV series that aired from 2019
- Gambler V: Playing for Keeps, a 1994 TV movie starring Kenny Rogers
- Playing for Keeps, a 2009 Canadian TV movie based on the Blue Edwards child-custody case
- "Playing for Keeps" (Diagnosis Murder), an episode of the TV series Diagnosis: Murder

== Music ==
- Playing for Keeps (Eddie Money album), 1980
- Playing for Keeps (Big Twist and the Mellow Fellows album), 1983
- "Playing for Keeps" (song), a 1956 hit song by Elvis Presley
- "Playing for Keeps", a song from Elle King's 2012 EP The Elle King EP
- "Playing for Keeps", a 2019 song by D-Block Europe featuring Dave, from the album PTSD

== Literature ==
- Playing for Keeps (novel), a 2007 book about superheroes by Mur Lafferty
- Playing for Keeps, a 1999 book about basketball player Michael Jordan by David Halberstam
