= List of Cash Box Top 100 number-one singles of 1962 =

These are the songs that reached number one on the Top 100 Best Sellers chart in 1962 as published by Cash Box magazine.

Issue date	Song	Artist
January 6	The Twist	Chubby Checker
January 13	The Twist	Chubby Checker
January 20	The Twist	Chubby Checker
January 27	The Twist	Chubby Checker
February 3	Duke of Earl	Gene Chandler
February 10	Duke of Earl	Gene Chandler
February 17	Duke of Earl	Gene Chandler
February 24	Duke of Earl	Gene Chandler
March 3	Duke of Earl	Gene Chandler
March 10	Hey! Baby	Bruce Channel
March 17	Hey! Baby	Bruce Channel
March 24	Hey! Baby	Bruce Channel
March 31	Hey! Baby	Bruce Channel
April 7	Slow Twistin'	Chubby Checker with Dee Dee Sharp
April 14	Good Luck Charm	Elvis Presley
April 21	Johnny Angel	Shelley Fabares
April 28	Mashed Potato Time	Dee Dee Sharp
May 5	Soldier Boy	The Shirelles
May 12	Soldier Boy	The Shirelles
May 19	Stranger on the Shore	Mr. Acker Bilk
May 26	I Can't Stop Loving You	Ray Charles
June 2	I Can't Stop Loving You	Ray Charles
June 9	I Can't Stop Loving You	Ray Charles
June 16	I Can't Stop Loving You	Ray Charles
June 23	I Can't Stop Loving You	Ray Charles
June 30	The Stripper	David Rose & Orchestra
July 7	The Stripper	David Rose & Orchestra
July 14	Roses Are Red (My Love)	Bobby Vinton
July 21	Roses Are Red (My Love)	Bobby Vinton
July 28	Roses Are Red (My Love)	Bobby Vinton
August 4	Roses Are Red (My Love)	Bobby Vinton
August 11	Breaking Up Is Hard to Do	Neil Sedaka
August 18	The Loco-Motion	Little Eva
August 25	The Loco-Motion	Little Eva
September 1	The Loco-Motion	Little Eva
September 8	Sherry	The Four Seasons
September 15	Sherry	The Four Seasons
September 22	Sherry	The Four Seasons
September 29	Sherry	The Four Seasons
October 6	Sherry	The Four Seasons
October 13	Sherry	The Four Seasons
October 20	Sherry	The Four Seasons
October 27	Monster Mash	Bobby (Boris) Pickett & Crypt-Kickers
November 3	Monster Mash	Bobby (Boris) Pickett & Crypt-Kickers
November 10	Monster Mash	Bobby (Boris) Pickett & Crypt-Kickers
November 17	Big Girls Don't Cry	The Four Seasons
November 24	Big Girls Don't Cry	The Four Seasons
December 1	Big Girls Don't Cry	The Four Seasons
December 8	Big Girls Don't Cry	The Four Seasons
December 15	Return to Sender	Elvis Presley
December 22	Limbo Rock	Chubby Checker
December 29	Telstar	The Tornadoes

== See also ==
- 1962 in music
- List of Hot 100 number-one singles of 1962 (U.S.)
