= Come See About Me (Neil Sedaka album) =

Studio album by Neil Sedaka
- Released: 1984
- Recorded: 1984
- Genre: Pop
- Label: Curb, MCA
- Producer: Dan Hartman

Neil Sedaka chronology
Is Anybody Gonna Miss You? (1982)	Come See About Me (1984)	The Good Times (1986)

Come See About Me is a 1984 album by American pop singer Neil Sedaka. It was released in the US on the Curb label and in Europe on the MCA label.

The album consists almost entirely of cover versions of other artists' hits from former times. Neil's daughter Dara appears in two of the songs, Mary Wilson of The Supremes and Gary U.S. Bonds join Sedaka in duet on other tracks. It was arranged by Neil Sedaka and Dan Hartman.

== Track listing ==
=== Side One ===
1. "Come See About Me" with Mary Wilson (Holland-Dozier-Holland) – 4:33
2. "Your Precious Love" with Dara Sedaka (Nickolas Ashford, Valerie Simpson) – 3:38
3. "Rhythm of the Rain" (John Gummoe) – 3:58
4. "Tears on My Pillow" (Sylvester Bradford, Al Lewis) – 3:03
5. "It's All In The Game" (Carl Sigman, Gen. Charles G. Dawes) – 2:37

=== Side Two ===
6. "New Orleans" with Gary U.S. Bonds (Frank Guida, Joseph Royster) – 3:06
7. "Searchin'" (Jerry Leiber, Mike Stoller) – 4:24
8. "Earth Angel (Will You Be Mine)" (Curtis Williams, Gaynel Hodge, Jesse Belvin) – 3:49
9. "Cathy's Clown" with Dara Sedaka (Don Everly) – 3:40
10. "Stagger Lee" (Lloyd Price, Harold Logan) – 4:07

== Singles ==
Curb Records released two singles from this album:

- "Your Precious Love" (#15 on the US Adult Contemporary charts) with "Searchin'" as its B-side
- "New Orleans" (w/ Gary U.S. Bonds), with "Rhythm of the Rain" as the B-side. In a rare instance, the B-side charted, reaching #37 on the US Adult Contemporary chart.

== CD re-issue from vinyl ==
In 2012, a bootleg album was released on CD in selected European Union countries, from vinyl.
