= New Orleans (Gary U.S. Bonds song) =

- 1960 45-rpm release by Gary U.S. Bonds (first pressing)

Single by Gary U.S. Bonds

from the album Dance 'Til Quarter to Three with U.S. Bonds
- B-side: "Please Forgive Me"
- Released: September 1960
- Genre: R&B, rock and roll
- Length: 2:44
- Label: Legrand
- Songwriters: Frank Guida, Joseph Royster
- Producer: Frank Guida

Gary U.S. Bonds singles chronology
"New Orleans" (1960)	"Not Me" (1961)

"New Orleans" is a song written by Frank Guida and Joseph Royster and performed by Gary U.S. Bonds. It was featured on his 1961 album Dance 'Til Quarter to Three with U.S. Bonds. Frank Guida also produced the track. Backing was provided by Gene Barge's group The Church Street Five. Bonds's version was reportedly a favorite of British musician and member of The Beatles, John Lennon.

== Chart performance ==
"New Orleans" reached No. 5 on the U.S. R&B chart, No. 6 on the U.S. pop chart, and #16 on the UK Singles Chart in 1960.

== Other charting versions ==
- Bern Elliott and the Fenmen - a single, in 1964, which reached #24 on the UK Singles Chart.
- Eddie Hodges - a single, in 1965, which reached #44 on the U.S. pop chart.
- The Chartbusters - a single, in 1965, which reached #134 on the U.S. pop chart.
- Steve Alaimo - a single, in 1967, which reached #126 on the U.S. pop chart.
- Neil Diamond - a single, in 1968, which reached #51 on the U.S. pop chart.
- Anthony Armstrong Jones, as the B-side to his 1969 single "And Say Goodbye". It reached #28 on the U.S. country chart.
- Harley Quinne, in 1972, reaching #19 in the UK Charts
- King Biscuit Boy - a single, in 1975, which reached #68 in Canada.
- Gillan - a single, in 1981, which reached #17 on the UK Singles Chart.

== Other versions ==
- Dave Myers and The Surftones, on their 1963 album The Winners of the 18 Band Surf Battle!
- The Ventures, on their 1963 album Let's Go!
- The Strangeloves, on their 1965 album I Want Candy.
- Dick and Dee Dee, on their 1966 album Songs We've Sung on Shindig.
- Wilson Pickett, on his 1967 album The Wicked Pickett.
- Paul Revere & the Raiders, on their 1966 album Just Like Us!
- The Kingsmen, on their 1964 album The Kingsmen Volume II and on their 1966 album 15 Great Hits.
- Bill Haley and His Comets, recorded January 1966 and released on Whisky a Go-Go album for Orfeon Records., plus live renditions on later albums.
- Travis Wammack, as a single in 1973, but it did not chart.
- Dr. John, on his 1975 album Dr. John and His New Orleans Congregation.
- Neil Sedaka, featuring Bonds, on his 1984 album Come See About Me.
- Joan Jett and The Blackhearts, on their 1984 album Glorious Results of a Misspent Youth.
- Robbie Coltrane, as a single in 1988 in the UK, but it did not chart.
- Teresa Brewer, on her 1991 compilation album 16 Most Requested Songs.
- Ray Stevens, on his 2007 album New Orleans Moon.
- The Grateful Dead performed the song live twice in 1969, three times in 1970, and once in 1984 along with members of The Band.
- The song was performed in the 1998 movie Blues Brothers 2000 by the Blues Brothers Band and "The Louisiana Gator Boys". It was also included in the movie's soundtrack album.
