= List of Billboard Hot 100 number ones of 1962 =

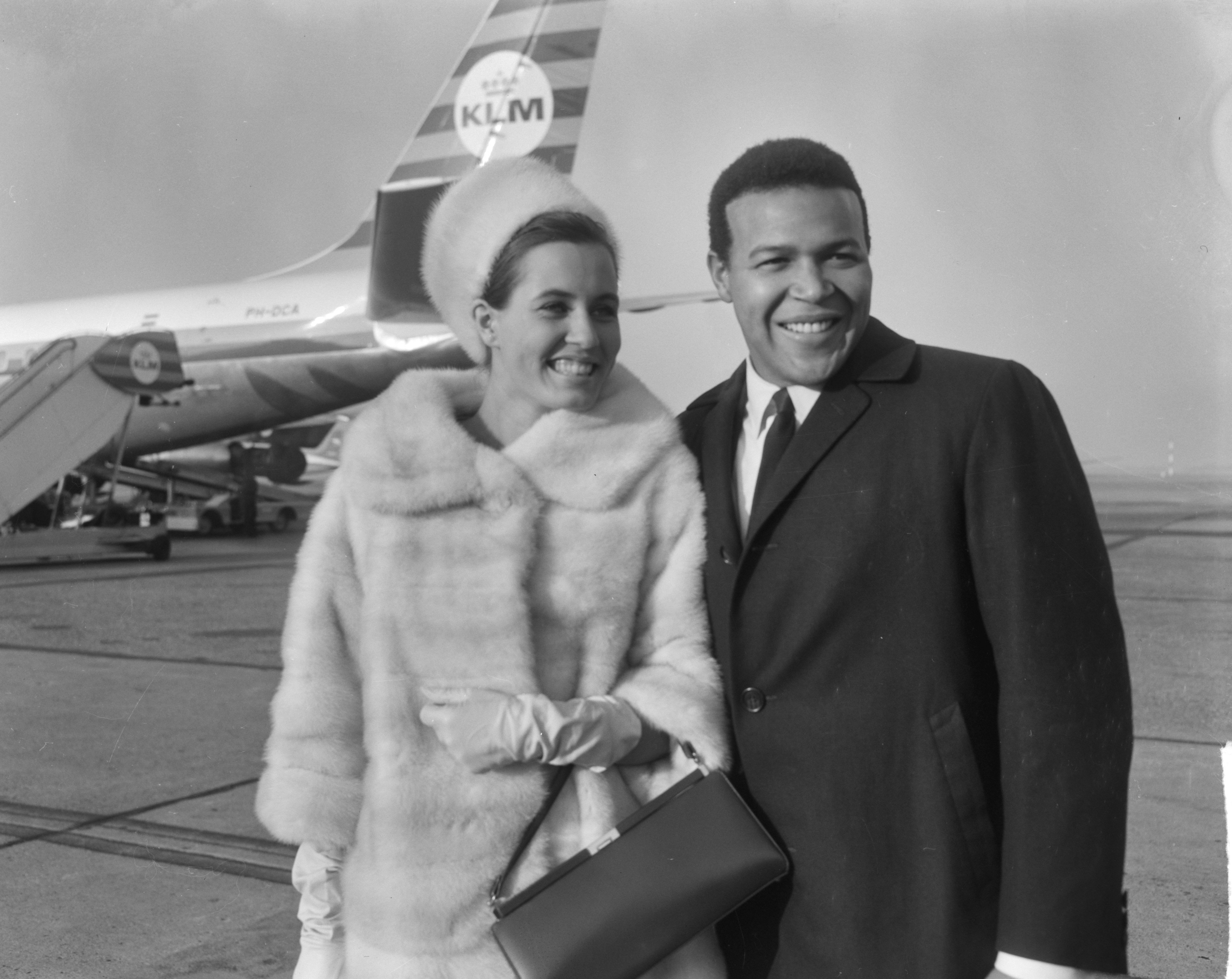
Chubby Checker (pictured with his wife Catharina Lodders in 1964) took his song "The Twist", a number one in 1960, back to the top spot in 1962.

The Billboard Hot 100 is a chart published since August 1958 by Billboard magazine which ranks the best-performing singles in the United States. In 1962, it was compiled based on a combination of sales and airplay data sourced from surveys of retail outlets and playlists submitted by radio stations respectively, and 21 different singles spent time at number one.

On the chart dated January 6, "The Lion Sleeps Tonight" by the Tokens was at number one, retaining its position from the previous week. A week later, Chubby Checker took the top spot with "The Twist". The single had topped the Hot 100 in September 1960, but had been re-released following a fresh surge in the popularity of the twist, the dance craze for which it was named. It was the first time that a single which had previously reached number one returned to the top spot as part of a second distinct chart run; this did not occur again until 2020. Two weeks later, Checker's song was displaced from the top spot by another twist-related song, "Peppermint Twist" by Joey Dee and the Starliters. Dee's single was followed in the top spot by "Duke of Earl" by Gene Chandler and "Hey! Baby" by Bruce Channel; all three were the first and only number one for their act. Shelley Fabares, one of the stars of TV's The Donna Reed Show, gained her sole number one in April with "Johnny Angel", which was featured on an episode of the ABC show. In May, the jazz clarinettist Mr. Acker Bilk topped the chart with "Stranger on the Shore"; it was his first U.S number one and the first Hot 100 chart-topper by a British act. (Note: In the pre-rock and roll era, the British singer Vera Lynn (accompanied by the Soldiers and Airmen of Her Majesty's Forces and the Johnny Johnston Singers) reached number one in 1952 on the separate sales, airplay, and jukebox play charts published by Billboard before the creation of the Hot 100.) A second British act, the Tornados, reached number one for the first time in December with "Telstar".

Eight consecutive number ones between July and November were by first time chart-toppers. In July, the composer and orchestra leader David Rose, who had charted in the pre-Hot 100 era as early as 1944, gained his first number one with "The Stripper", his final chart entry; in contrast Bobby Vinton reached number one with his first charting single, "Roses Are Red (My Love)". Neil Sedaka, Little Eva, and Tommy Roe all topped the chart for the first time in August and September. The Four Seasons had their first number one in September with "Sherry", which spent five weeks at number one. Just a month after the song exited the top spot, they were back at number one with "Big Girls Don't Cry", which also spent five weeks atop the Hot 100. The two songs tied with "I Can't Stop Loving You" by Ray Charles for the year's longest-running number one. The Four Seasons were the only act with more than one number one in 1962 and their total of 10 weeks in the top spot was the most achieved by any act. Between the Four Seasons' two number ones, Bobby "Boris" Pickett and the Crypt-Kickers gained their only chart-topper with the Halloween-themed novelty song "Monster Mash" and the Crystals topped the chart for the first time with "He's a Rebel". Despite the credit on the label, none of the members of the Crystals actually performed on the song. Their producer, Phil Spector, decided to rush-release a version of the song after learning of the impending release of a competing version but, with the group unavailable, used session singers the Blossoms while still crediting the single to the Crystals. Both "I Can't Stop Loving You" and "He's a Rebel" have been included in Rolling Stone magazine's list of the 500 Greatest Songs of All Time.

== Chart history ==
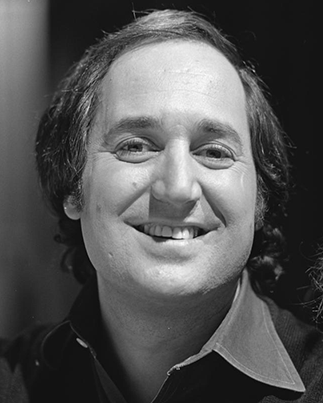
Neil Sedaka (pictured in 1971) had his first chart-topper with "Breaking Up Is Hard to Do".

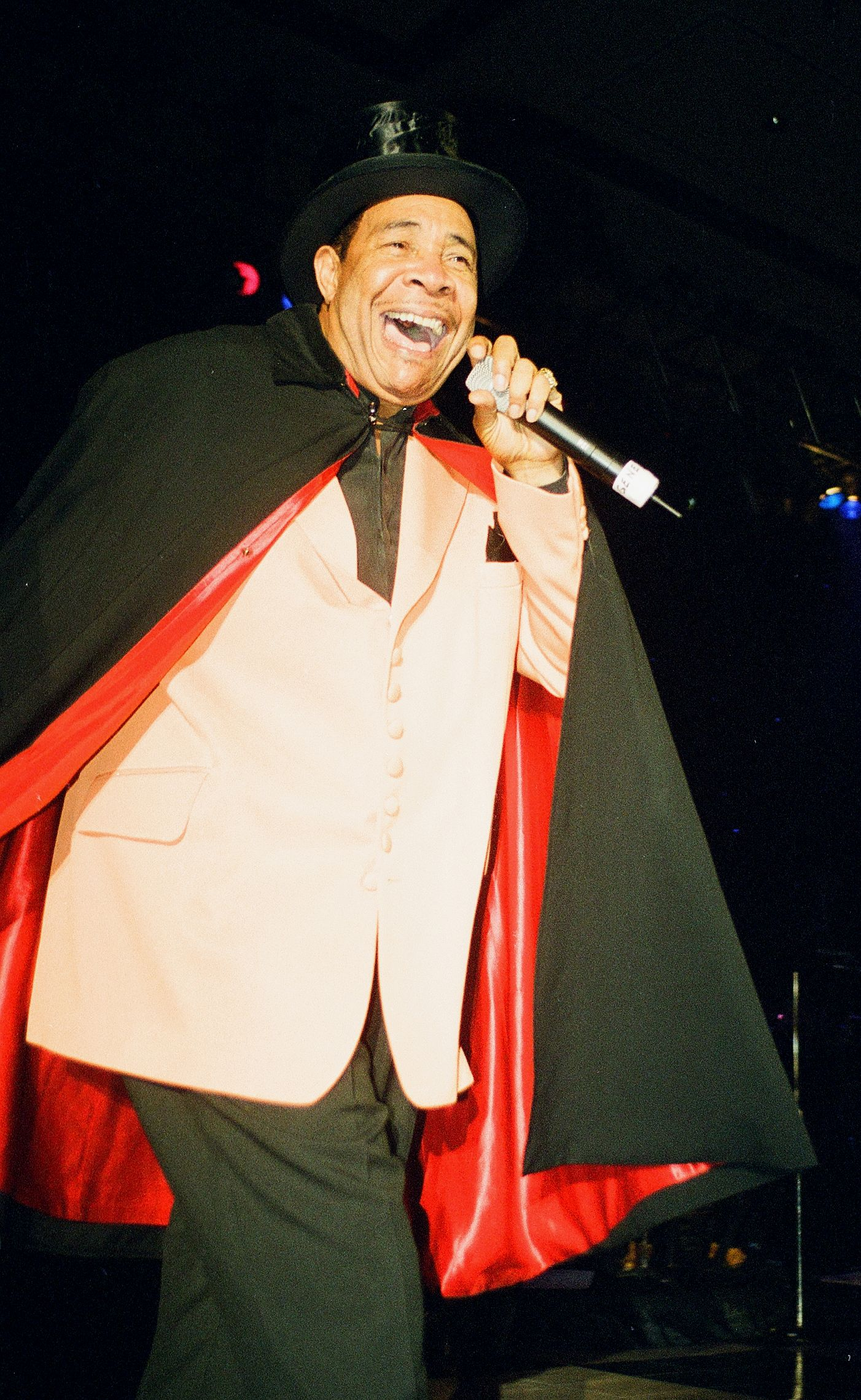
"Duke of Earl" was the first number one for Gene Chandler (pictured in 1997).

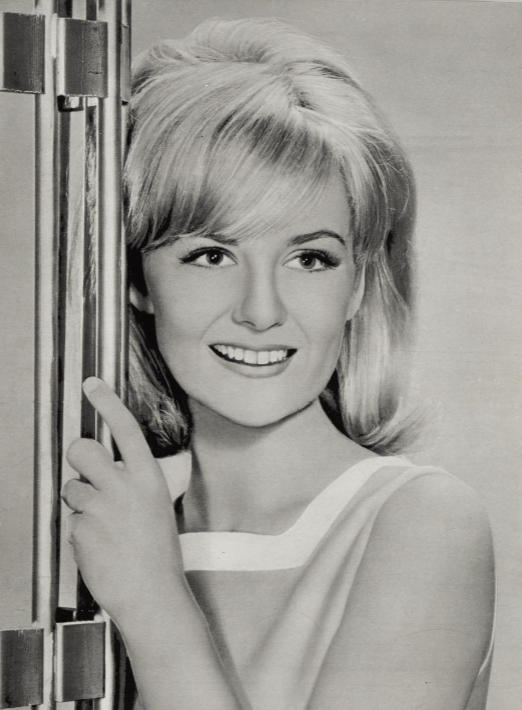
Shelley Fabares reached number one with "Johnny Angel".

Chart history
No. (Note: The "No." column indicates the numerical sequence of number ones in Hot 100 history. "Re" indicates a single returning to number one.)	Issue date	Title	Artist(s)	Ref.
63	January 6	"The Lion Sleeps Tonight"	The Tokens	
35 (re)	January 13	"The Twist"	Chubby Checker	
35 (re)	January 20	"The Twist"	Chubby Checker	
64	January 27	"Peppermint Twist"	Joey Dee and the Starliters	
64	February 3	"Peppermint Twist"	Joey Dee and the Starliters	
64	February 10	"Peppermint Twist"	Joey Dee and the Starliters	
65	February 17	"Duke of Earl"	Gene Chandler	
65	February 24	"Duke of Earl"	Gene Chandler	
65	March 3	"Duke of Earl"	Gene Chandler	
66	March 10	"Hey! Baby"	Bruce Channel	
66	March 17	"Hey! Baby"	Bruce Channel	
66	March 24	"Hey! Baby"	Bruce Channel	
67	March 31	"Don't Break the Heart That Loves You"	Connie Francis	
68	April 7	"Johnny Angel"	Shelley Fabares	
68	April 14	"Johnny Angel"	Shelley Fabares	
69	April 21	"Good Luck Charm"	Elvis Presley	
69	April 28	"Good Luck Charm"	Elvis Presley	
70	May 5	"Soldier Boy"	The Shirelles	
70	May 12	"Soldier Boy"	The Shirelles	
70	May 19	"Soldier Boy"	The Shirelles	
71	May 26	"Stranger on the Shore"	Mr. Acker Bilk	
72	June 2	"I Can't Stop Loving You"	Ray Charles	
72	June 9	"I Can't Stop Loving You"	Ray Charles	
72	June 16	"I Can't Stop Loving You"	Ray Charles	
72	June 23	"I Can't Stop Loving You"	Ray Charles	
72	June 30	"I Can't Stop Loving You"	Ray Charles	
73	July 7	"The Stripper"	David Rose	
74	July 14	"Roses Are Red (My Love)"	Bobby Vinton	
74	July 21	"Roses Are Red (My Love)"	Bobby Vinton	
74	July 28	"Roses Are Red (My Love)"	Bobby Vinton	
74	August 4	"Roses Are Red (My Love)"	Bobby Vinton	
75	August 11	"Breaking Up Is Hard to Do"	Neil Sedaka	
75	August 18	"Breaking Up Is Hard to Do"	Neil Sedaka	
76	August 25	"The Loco-Motion"	Little Eva	
77	September 1	"Sheila"	Tommy Roe	
77	September 8	"Sheila"	Tommy Roe	
78	September 15	"Sherry"	The Four Seasons	
78	September 22	"Sherry"	The Four Seasons	
78	September 29	"Sherry"	The Four Seasons	
78	October 6	"Sherry"	The Four Seasons	
78	October 13	"Sherry"	The Four Seasons	
79	October 20	"Monster Mash"	Bobby "Boris" Pickett and the Crypt-Kickers	
79	October 27	"Monster Mash"	Bobby "Boris" Pickett and the Crypt-Kickers	
80	November 3	"He's a Rebel"	The Crystals	
80	November 10	"He's a Rebel"	The Crystals	
81	November 17	"Big Girls Don't Cry"	The Four Seasons	
81	November 24	"Big Girls Don't Cry"	The Four Seasons	
81	December 1	"Big Girls Don't Cry"	The Four Seasons	
81	December 8	"Big Girls Don't Cry"	The Four Seasons	
81	December 15	"Big Girls Don't Cry"	The Four Seasons	
82	December 22	"Telstar"	The Tornados	
82	December 29	"Telstar"	The Tornados	

== Number-one artists ==
List of number-one artists by total weeks at number one
Weeks at No. 1	Artist
10	The Four Seasons
5	Ray Charles
4	Bobby Vinton
3	Joey Dee and the Starliters
3	Gene Chandler
3	Bruce Channel
3	The Shirelles
2	Chubby Checker
2	Shelley Fabares
2	Elvis Presley
2	Neil Sedaka
2	Tommy Roe
2	Bobby "Boris" Picket and the Crypt-Kickers
2	The Crystals
2	The Tornados
1	The Tokens
1	Connie Francis
1	Mr. Acker Bilk
1	David Rose
1	Little Eva

== See also ==
- 1962 in music
- List of Billboard number-one singles
- List of Billboard Hot 100 top-ten singles in 1962
- List of Billboard Hot 100 number-one singles from 1958 to 1969
