= Street Party (The Mellow Fellows album) =

Studio album by the Mellow Fellows
- Released: 1990
- Studio: Dr. Caw
- Genres: R&B, blues
- Label: Alligator
- Producers: Gene Barge, Peter Special

The Mellow Fellows chronology
| Live from Chicago! – Bigger Than Life!! (1987) | Street Party (1990) |

Street Party is an album by the American band the Mellow Fellows, released in 1990. It was the band's first album since the March 1990 death of frontman Big Twist. The Mellow Fellows supported the album with a North American tour. Street Party was a success on radio stations throughout Illinois.

== Production ==
The album was recorded at Dr. Caw Recording, in Northbrook, Illinois. It was the band's first studio album with early bandmember Martin Allbritton. The Mellow Fellows wrote five of Street Party's songs. The bandmembers strove to play more as an ensemble rather than as a backup band. "Feels Like Rain" is a cover of the John Hiatt song. "We'll Be Friends" is a tribute to Big Twist. "Since I Fell for You" was written by Buddy Johnson. "Don't Turn Your Heater Down" was cowritten by Steve Cropper.

== Critical reception ==
Professional ratings
Review scores
| Source | Rating |
|---|---|
| AllMusic | 4/5 stars |
| Calgary Herald | B |
| MusicHound Blues: The Essential Album Guide | 2/5 stars |
| The Penguin Guide to Blues Recordings | 3/4 stars |
| Record-Journal | A |
| The Virgin Encyclopedia of R&B and Soul | 3/5 stars |

The Calgary Herald deemed Street Party "an album solidly anchored in the journeyman work ethic." The Chicago Reader labeled it "a gutty, powerful album that shows a band restless to explore new directions as they retain their patented good-time roots." The Kingston Whig-Standard considered it "a treatment of classic rhythm and blues, the likes of which haven't been heard in a long time."

The Washington Post determined that "Allbritton is a real find—a soul-shouter cum blues-belter who sings with both passion and authority, precisely the combination a lot of these songs demand." The Morning Call deemed the album "hot and brassy, a joyride of '60s-era Chicago R&B." The Record-Journal wrote that "Allbritton's gut-wrenching vocals wail, shriek and generally haul emotion all the hell over the place."

AllMusic called Allbritton "a melismatic and undeniably more powerful vocalist than the finesse-oriented Twist."

== Track listing ==
| No. | Title | Length |
|---|---|---|
| 1. | "I've Got to Find a Way" |
| 2. | "Street Party" |
| 3. | "I've Got a Feeling" |
| 4. | "Feels Like Rain" |
| 5. | "Driving Wheel" |
| 6. | "We'll Be Friends" |
| 7. | "Don't Turn Your Heater Down" |
| 8. | "Since I Fell for You" |
| 9. | "Last Night" |
| 10. | "Me and My Woman" |
| 11. | "Broad Daylight" |
