= Twist (dance) =

Dance inspired by rock and roll music

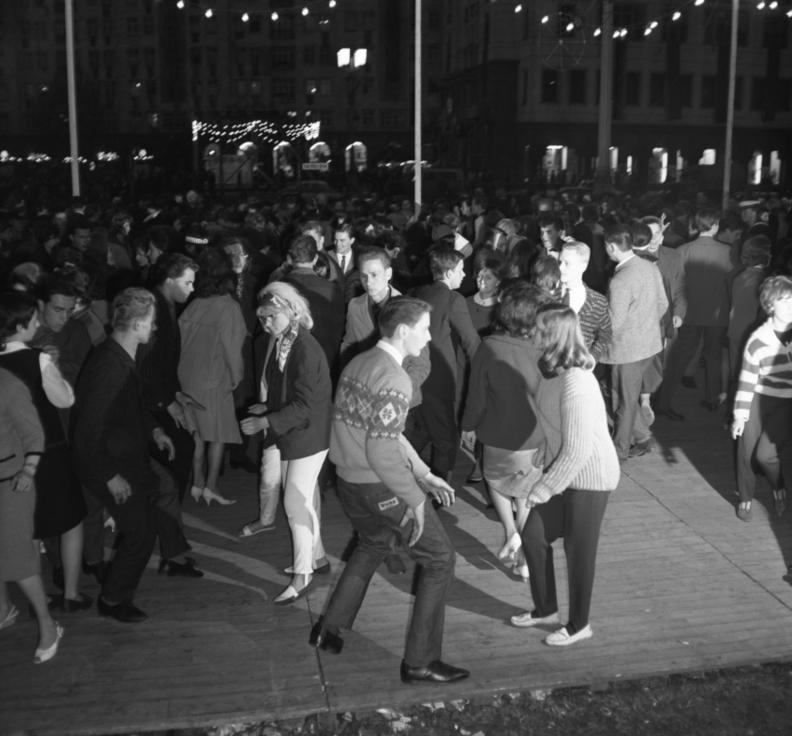
Dancing the twist, East Berlin, May 17, 1964

The twist (Note: Google Books counts 643, 50, and 8 sources using the terms "the twist dance", "the dance twist", and "the dance the twist" as of October 23, 2015. A full-page ad in Billboard following the release of the single used "'The Twist' dance".) is a dance that was inspired by rock and roll music. From 1959 to the early sixties it became a worldwide dance craze, enjoying immense popularity while drawing controversies from critics who felt it was too provocative. It inspired dances such as the Jerk, the Pony, the Watusi, the Mashed Potato, the Monkey, and the Funky Chicken, but none were as popular.

Having seen teenagers in Tampa, Florida, doing the dance, Hank Ballard wrote "The Twist", which became the B-side of Hank Ballard and the Midnighters' 1959 single "Teardrops on Your Letter". Dick Clark, having noticed the dance becoming popular among teenagers, recommended to Cameo Records that the more wholesome Chubby Checker rerecord the song, which was released in 1959 and became a number one hit in 1960. The dance became passé among teenagers as it became acceptable among adults and the song was re-released, becoming a number one hit again in 1962.

A world record was set in DeLand, Florida, on October 11, 2012, when Chubby Checker sang the song live and the crowd danced. An estimated 4,000 people twisted along with Checker, surpassing the previous Guinness World Record for most people twisting in the streets at once.

== Steps ==
The twist is performed by standing with the feet approximately shoulder width apart. The torso may be squared to the knees and hips, or turned at an angle so one foot is farther forward than the other. The arms are held out from the body, bent at the elbow. The hips, torso, and legs rotate on the balls of the feet as a single unit, with the arms staying more or less stationary. The feet grind back and forth on the floor, and the dance can be varied in speed, intensity, and vertical height as necessary. Occasionally one leg is lifted off the floor for styling, but generally the dance posture is low and with the feet in contact with the floor with very little vertical motion. The moves include the mashed potato, swimming, drowning, twisting, arm swing and single leg twist.

Another description of the moves popularized by Chubby Checker:

1. STANCE: Prizefighter position, one leg extended forward, and arms extended forward from the elbow.

2. MOVEMENT: Hips swivel from side to side as if rubbing oneself with a towel. Knees are bent slightly. As hips move left, arms move to the right, and vice versa.

3. FOOT MOVEMENT: Twist feet as if putting out a cigarette. Entire body moving forward and back and from side to side.

According to Time magazine, "the dancers barely ever touch each other or move their feet. Everything else, however, moves. The upper body sways forward and backward and the hips and shoulders twirl erotically, while the arms thrust in, out, up and down with the pistonlike motions of baffled bird keepers fighting off a flock of attack blue jays."

== Etymology ==
The use of the name "twist" for dancing goes back to the nineteenth century. According to Marshall and Jean Stearns in Jazz Dance, a pelvic dance motion called the twist came to America from the Congo during slavery. One of the hit songs of early blackface minstrelsy was banjo player Joel Walker Sweeney's "Vine Twist". One of the early black dance crazes of the early twentieth century was the "Mess Around", described by songwriter Perry Bradford in his 1912 hit "Messin' Around" as: "Now anybody can learn the knack, put your hands on your hips and bend your back; stand in one spot nice and tight, and twist around, twist around with all of your might". But the twist at this point was basically grinding the hips. Blues singer Bo Carter recorded "Twist It Babe" in 1931, the reference in the lyrics apparently being a metaphor for sex. In his "Winin' Boy Blues" in the late 1930s, Jelly Roll Morton sang, "Mama, mama, look at sis, she's out on the levee doing the double twist". In the 1953 song "Let the Boogie Woogie Roll", Clyde McPhatter and the Drifters sang, "When she looked at me her eyes just shined like gold, and when she did the twist she bopped me to my soul".

But the simple dance that we now know as the Twist originates in the late fifties among teenagers, and was popularized by Chubby Checker in his preparation to debut the song to a national audience on August 6, 1960, on The Dick Clark Show, a Saturday night program that, unlike disc jockey Clark's daytime American Bandstand, was a stage show with a sitting audience.

== Origin ==
Dick Clark was a powerhouse in music at the time, thanks to American Bandstand, which ran five times a week in the afternoons, showcasing local dancers and visiting performers who lip-synched along with their recordings. Clark saw the song's potential when he heard Hank Ballard's original version, but Ballard and his group, whose greatest hit had been "Work With Me Annie" in 1954, was considered too raunchy to appeal to Clark's teenage audience. He urged Philadelphia record label Cameo/Parkway to record a new version of "The Twist" with young, wholesome Chubby Checker, who had displayed his talent for copying other artists on an earlier novelty hit, "The Class". Released in summer 1960, Checker's rendition of "The Twist" became number one on the singles chart in the United States in 1960 and then again in 1962.

In 1961, at the height of the craze, patrons at New York City's Peppermint Lounge on West 45th Street were twisting to the house band, a local group from New Jersey, Joey Dee and the Starliters. Their song, "Peppermint Twist (Part 1)" became number one in the United States for three weeks in January 1962. In 1962 Bo Diddley released his album Bo Diddley's a Twister. He recorded several twist tracks, including "The Twister", "Bo's Twist", and "Mama Don't Allow No Twistin'", which referenced the objections many parents had to the pelvic motions of the dance.

In Latin America, the twist caught fire in the early 1960s, fueled by Bill Haley & His Comets. Their recordings of "The Spanish Twist" and "Florida Twist" were successes, particularly in Mexico. Haley, in interviews, credited Checker and Ballard. Coincidentally, Checker appeared in two musicals that took their titles from films Haley made in the 1950s: Twist Around the Clock (after Rock Around the Clock) and Don't Knock the Twist (after Don't Knock the Rock).

== Twist hits on Billboard ==
- "The Twist" by Hank Ballard and the Midnighters (No. 28, 1959)
- "The Twist" by Chubby Checker (No. 1, 1960; No. 1, 1962)
- "Let's Twist Again" by Chubby Checker (No. 8, 1961)
- "Twistin' U.S.A." by Danny & the Juniors (No. 20, 1961)
- "Slow Twistin'" by Chubby Checker (No. 3, 1962)
- "Peppermint Twist – Part 1" by Joey Dee and the Starliters (No. 1, 1962)
- "Hey, Let's Twist" by Joey Dee and the Starliters (No. 20, 1962)
- "Dear Lady Twist" by Gary U.S. Bonds (No. 9, 1962)
- "Twist, Twist Senora" by Gary U.S. Bonds (No. 9, 1962)
- "Twistin' Postman" by the Marvelettes (No. 34, 1962)
- "Twistin' the Night Away" by Sam Cooke (No. 9, 1962)
- "Twist and Shout" by the Isley Brothers (No. 17, 1962)
- "Twist-Her" by Bill Black's Combo (No. 26, 1962)
- "Soul Twist" by King Curtis & His Noble Knights (No. 17, 1962)
- "Bristol Twistin" Annie" by the Dovells (No. 27, 1962)
- "Percolator (Twist)" by Billy Joe & the Checkmates (No. 10, 1962)
- "Do You Know How To Twist" by Hank Ballard and the Midnighters (No. 87, 1962)
- "Twist It Up" by Chubby Checker (No. 25, 1963)
- "Twist and Shout" by the Beatles (No. 2, 1964)

== Twist films ==
- Twist Around the Clock (1961) – with Chubby Checker
- Don't Knock the Twist (1961) – with Chubby Checker
- Hey, Let's Twist! (1961) – with Joey Dee
- The Continental Twist (1961)
- The Twist (1992)

== In popular culture ==
=== Monkey ===
The monkey is a similar novelty dance, most popular in 1963. The dance was popularized by two R&B records: Major Lance's "The Monkey Time" and the Miracles' "Mickey's Monkey" both Top 10 pop hits released during the summer of 1963. A comical story about "A cat named Mickey from out of town" (William "Mickey" Stevenson) who "spread his new dance all around", the latter song helped popularize The Monkey as a national dance craze in the early 1960s.

The monkey is often referenced in the American animated comedy television series Johnny Bravo (in every theme song in addition to many times in the actual show), although it may be a completely different dance. The TV series The Simpsons also referenced the dance at least twice (in seasons 4 and 8). The thrash metal band Exodus reference the dance in their song "The Toxic Waltz" (from Fabulous Disaster) with the lyric "Used to do the monkey, but now it's not cool". Characters in the anime series Overman King Gainer do the monkey in the opening animation and in the show itself.

=== Twist ===
In 1962 Dell Comics produced a one-shot comic called The Twist that fictionalized the Peppermint Lounge dance craze. Several television shows parodied the dance in the early 1960s. An episode of The Alvin Show showed a parody of the Twist called The Alvin Twist. "The Flintstones" version was called the Twitch and aired in 1962, as did "The Dick Van Dyke Show"'s Twizzle. The same year, it was featured in an episode of Leave It to Beaver called "Beaver Joins a Record Club". It was also mentioned in the Amazing Spider-Man issue number 2, where Jameson tells Peter Parker to buy "twist records" with his money.

The craze was even referenced by the United States Federal Open Market Committee (FOMC) when actions in 1961 were dubbed "Operation Twist". In 2011 the FOMC revived Operation Twist.

By the mid-1960s the dance reached the Soviet Union and was popularized in a 1967 movie called Kidnapping, Caucasian Style. The dance moves were described – and visualized – in the same manner as Chubby Checker described them, by putting out cigarettes with the balls of the feet.

The dance would come to be seen as emblematic of the early 1960s in later years, with popular songs, television shows, and movies likely to reference it when they wanted to convey the spirit of that time period. In 1978 rock band the B-52's included the line, "Twisting round the fire", in their song of 1960s beach party film references, "Rock Lobster".

"The Twist" was one of the inspirations for the Exodus song "The Toxic Waltz", from their 1989 album Fabulous Disaster.

The band Nirvana's song "Aneurysm", first released in 1991 on the "Smells Like Teen Spirit" single, prominently features a mention of the spirited dance in the first line of each verse, prompting its listeners to, "Come on over, and do the twist."

In 1993, a film by Ron Mann called Twist was a documentary about the craze. Quentin Tarantino's 1994 film Pulp Fiction featured John Travolta and Uma Thurman dancing the Twist to Chuck Berry's "You Never Can Tell" as part of the Jack Rabbit Slim's Twist Contest. In Spider-Man 3 (2007), Harry Osborn and Mary Jane Watson dance to "The Twist". In a Season One episode of Mad Men ("The Hobo Code"), Peggy Olsson and several other employees of Sterling Cooper dance to Chubby Checker's "The Twist". Season One takes place in 1960, when Checker's version first became a hit.

In 1995 Faber & Faber published The Twist: The Story of the Song and Dance That Changed the World by Jim Dawson, ISBN 978-0-571-19852-8. In 2009 a version of the Twist was performed by Lady Gaga and her backup dancers in the official video for the song "Bad Romance". The Twist was also a pivotal part of the book The Strange Case of Origami Yoda (2010), in which an origami puppet made to resemble Yoda gives out advice.

In 2016, the Seattle band Naked Giants released their EP R.I.P., which included the song "Twist", which includes references to the eponymous dance. The introduction of the song features two overlaid tracks, including one of a man recounting how "back in my day, we used to do the twist every night, 'till the neighbors complained", overlaid with a girl named Suzie being asked to do the twist. Later, the lead singer tells the listener "I wanna see you twist".

== See also ==
- Fad dances
