= Nothing Left to Lose (Gary U.S. Bonds album) =

Studio album by Gary U.S. Bonds
- Released: 1996
- Genre: Pop, Soul, R&B
- Length: 39:42
- Label: VitaPro
- Producer: Yank Barry

Gary U.S. Bonds chronology
Standing in the Line of Fire (1984)	Nothing Left to Lose (1996)	Back in 20 (2004)

Nothing Left to Lose is an album released by Gary U.S. Bonds on the VitaPro label in 1996. It was produced by Yank Barry as a promotion for the Global Village Market initiative. The track "Young Blood" features a duet with Ben E. King, while "1950s Kind of Mood" appeared again on Bonds's live album From the Front Row... Live! in 2003. The liner notes do not contain any information about the musicians. The album had only a very limited release on CD and has not been reissued.

== Track listing ==
- All songs written by Gary U.S. Bonds.
1. "Nothing Left to Lose" - 4:42
2. "Give Me the Love" - 4:22
3. "Can't Win for Losing" - 4:39
4. "1950s Kind of Mood" - 4:11
5. "Souvenirs" - 4:54
6. "Young Blood" - 3:40
7. "I Don't Need More Than That" - 4:40
8. "Search & Seize Her" - 3:59
9. "Vagabond Man" - 4:45

== Personnel ==
Musicians:

- Gary U.S. Bonds - lead vocals
- Ben E. King - vocals ("Young Blood")
- Bob Cohen- guitar
- Jeff Smallwood-guitar

Production:

- Yank Barry - producer
- Gary U.S. Bonds - producer
