= Let Them Talk (Gary U.S. Bonds album) =

Studio album by Gary U.S. Bonds
- Released: 2009
- Genre: R&B, Soul
- Label: Freedom Records
- Producer: Gary U.S. Bonds; Laurie Anderson

Gary U.S. Bonds chronology
Back In 20 (2004)	Let Them Talk (2009)

Let Them Talk is a 2009 album by Gary U.S. Bonds.

== Track listing ==
1. "Whine" (Laurie C. Anderson, Gary "U.S." Bonds, Mark Leimbach)
2. "Pour Me" (Anderson, Bonds, Leimbach)
3. "If I Live Through This" (Pam Reynolds)
4. "Let Them Talk" (Sonny Thompson)
5. "Get It Together" (Danny Kean)
6. "Have Mercy" (Leimbach)
7. "I'm Gone" (Kean)
8. "She's a Woman" (Anderson, Bonds)
9. "I Got Love" (Kean)
10. "I Forgot How Bad My Good Woman Could Be" (James Timothy Du Bois, Arnold Goldstein, Jim Hurt)
11. "Burden" (Anderson, Bonds)
12. "Shake a Hand" (Joe Morris)
