= Back in 20 =

Studio album by Gary U.S. Bonds
- Released: June 1, 2004
- Genres: R&B, rock, soul
- Length: 45:54
- Label: M.C. Records
- Producers: Gary U.S. Bonds; Laurie Anderson

Gary U.S. Bonds chronology
Nothing Left To Lose (1995)	Back in 20 (2004)	Let Them Talk (2009)

Professional ratings
Review scores
Source	Rating
AllMusic	3.5/5 stars

Back in 20 is a rock album released by Gary U.S. Bonds in 2004 on the M.C. Records label. The album features guest appearances by Bruce Springsteen, Southside Johnny, Dickey Betts, and Phoebe Snow. The title of the album is a reference to Bonds' sporadic croppings of popularity: in the early 1960s, then the early 1980s, and finally the early 2000s.

== Track listing ==
1. "Can't Teach an Old Dog New Tricks" (Laurie Anderson, Gary U.S. Bonds) - 4:24
2. "Murder in the First Degree" (Bonds, Mark Leimbach) - 3:13
3. "Take Me Back" (Leimbach) - 3:25
4. "She Just Wants to Dance" (Georgina Graper, Kevin Moore) - 3:09
5. "Fanny Mae" (Waymon Glasco, Morris Levy, Clarence L. Lewis) - 3:39
6. "Bitch/Dumb Ass" (Anderson, Bonds) - 4:05
7. "I've Got Dreams to Remember" (Otis Redding, Zelma Redding, Joe Rock) - 4:36
8. "Nothing But Blue" (Anderson, Bonds) - 4:17
9. "She Chose to Be My Lady" (Bonds) - 3:30
10. "Too Much, Too Little, Too Late" (Anderson, Bonds, Leimbach) - 3:47
11. "Every Time I Roll the Dice" (Max Barnes, Troy Seals) - 4:29
12. "Don't You Do It Here" (Anderson, Bonds, Leimbach) - 3:39

== Personnel ==
=== Musicians ===
- Gary U.S. Bonds - lead vocals
- Bruce Springsteen - guitar ("Can't Teach an Old Dog New Tricks), background vocals ("Can't Teach an Old Dog New Tricks)
- Southside Johnny - harmonica ("Can't Teach an Old Dog New Tricks", "Take Me Back"), vocals ("Fannie Mae")
- Dickey Betts - guitar ("She Just Wants to Dance", "Bitch/Dumb Ass")
- Phoebe Snow - vocals ("Bitch/Dumb Ass")
- Joey Stann - saxophone
- Mark Leimbach - guitar
- Dan Cipriano - saxophone
- Jeff Kazee - keyboards
- Hal Selzer - bass
- Lance Hyland Stark - drums
- Jim Wacker - piano, keyboards
- Walter Smith - background vocals

=== Production ===
- Gary U.S. Bonds - producer, engineer, horn arrangements
- Laurie Anderson - producer, engineer, photography
- Bruce Springsteen - engineer
- John Paul Cavanaugh - photography
- Dan Cipriano - horn arrangements
- Chris Musgrave - engineer
- Glen Robinson - engineer
- Toby Scott - engineer
- Phoebe Snow - engineer
- Joey Stann - horn arrangements
