= This Little Girl =

- US single picture sleeve

Single by Gary U.S. Bonds

from the album Dedication
- B-side: "Way Back When"
- Released: April 1981
- Genre: Pop
- Label: EMI America
- Songwriter: Bruce Springsteen
- Producers: Bruce Springsteen & Steven Van Zandt

Gary U.S. Bonds singles chronology
"Copycat" (1962)	"This Little Girl" (1981)	"Jole Blon" (1981)

"This Little Girl" is a song written by Bruce Springsteen. A version by Gary U.S. Bonds was listed on music charts in 1981.

== History ==
"This Little Girl" was written by Bruce Springsteen and has its origins in the 1978 outtake "Ain't Good Enough For You" from the Darkness on the Edge of Town sessions.

The song was notably recorded by Gary U.S. Bonds for his album, Dedication. It was the first of two single releases from the album. During production, Bob Clearmountain remixed Bonds's recording. Clarence Clemons performed a saxophone for the recording.

Bonds's version became a hit in spring 1981, reaching number eleven in the US Billboard Hot 100 and also charting well in Canada and New Zealand. It peaked at number 43 in the UK Singles Chart.

Bonds performed the song during a guest appearance at a Springsteen River Tour concert on July 9, 1981.

As reported by Casey Kasem on the American Top 40 program of June 20, 1981, the song was born of a collaboration between Bonds and Springsteen after the two spent a few hours together commiserating about their stalled careers. As a thank-you gift for contributing to the song, Bonds gave Springsteen a 1963 Chevrolet Impala.

Dion DiMucci's same-titled Hot 100 #21 record from late May 1963 bears no resemblance.

== Charts ==
=== Weekly charts ===
Chart (1981)	Peak position
Canadian RPM Top Singles	7
New Zealand	11
UK Singles (Official Charts)	43
US Billboard Hot 100	11
US Mainstream Rock Airplay (Billboard)	5
US Cash Box Top 100	7

=== Year-end charts ===
Chart (1981)	Rank
Canada	96
US Cash Box Top 100	47
US Top Pop Singles (Billboard)	58
