= On the Line (Gary U.S. Bonds album) =

Studio album by Gary U.S. Bonds
- Released: June 1982
- Recorded: 1982
- Studio: Power Station, New York City
- Genre: Rock, pop
- Length: 40:29
- Label: EMI America, Razor & Tie, BGO
- Producer: Steven Van Zandt, Bruce Springsteen

Gary U.S. Bonds chronology
Dedication (1981)	On the Line (1982)	Standing in the Line of Fire (1984)

Singles from On the Line
- 1. "Out of Work" Released: June 1982

Professional ratings
Review scores
Source	Rating
Allmusic	3.5/5 stars

On the Line is an album released by Gary U.S. Bonds in 1982, the second of two on which he collaborated with Bruce Springsteen & the E Street Band, the first being Dedication, released the previous year, 1981.

== Background ==
The musicians accompanying Bonds on the album include many members of the E Street Band. The album includes seven songs written by Springsteen, one written by Steven Van Zandt, and two written by Bonds himself ("Turn the Music Down", "Bring Her Back"), and features a duet with Steven Van Zandt on the track "Angelyne". The album produced one single, "Out of Work" which peaked at #21 on the Billboard Pop Singles charts.

According to the liner notes on the Razor & Tie reissue, after recording the album, Columbia Records had Bruce Springsteen remove his vocals from the tracks, specifically from the track "Angelyne", so Van Zandt stepped up to record the duet instead. Because of this, although Springsteen can still be heard on several of the tracks, he is not credited in the original liner notes. Additionally, the liner notes state that three other songs were recorded for the album but not present on the final release including Springsteen's "Action in the Street", "Lion's Den", and "Savin' Up". Springsteen's studio version of "Lion's Den" and a live version of "Rendezvous" were eventually released in 1998 on his boxset Tracks, and "Savin' Up" appeared on Clarence Clemons' first solo album Rescue (1983); "Action in the Street" remains unreleased. Springsteen's studio version of "Rendezvous" was finally released in 2010 on The Promise.

The album was re-released in 1992 on the Razor Edge label of Razor & Tie music, and then again in 2009 on BGO Records paired with Dedication.

== Track listing ==
All songs written by Bruce Springsteen unless otherwise stated.

Side 1
No.	Title	Length
1.	"Hold On (To What You Got)"	3:05
2.	"Out of Work"	2:53
3.	"Club Soul City"	3:36
4.	"Soul Deep" (Wayne Carson)	3:16
5.	"Love's on the Line"	3:38
6.	"Turn the Music Down" (Gary L. Anderson)	3:37

Side 2
No.	Title	Length
7.	"Rendezvous"	2:41
8.	"Angelyne"	4:03
9.	"All I Need"	5:10
10.	"Bring Her Back" (Gary L. Anderson)	3:45
11.	"Last Time" (Steven Van Zandt)	4:45

== Personnel ==
=== Musicians ===
- Gary U.S. Bonds – lead vocals
- Bruce Springsteen – background vocals (uncredited)
- Steven Van Zandt – guitar (solo "Last Time"), background vocals (duet "Angelyne")
- Roy Bittan – keyboards
- Clarence Clemons – saxophone (solo "Angelyne" & "Out of Work"), background vocals
- Danny Federici – keyboards (solo "Club Soul City"), accordion
- Max Weinberg – drums
- Garry Tallent – bass

=== Additional musicians ===
- Chuck Jackson – background vocals ("Club Soul City")
- J.T. Bowen – background vocals ("Out of Work")
- Rusty Cloud – keyboards (solo "Bring Her Back"), background vocals
- Bill Derby – guitar (solo "Turn the Music Down"), background vocals
- Joe Martin – guitar, background vocals
- Mike Micara – drums
- George Ruiz – bass, background vocals
- Joey Stann – saxophone (solo "Bring Her Back" & "Love's On the Line"), background vocals

=== Technical ===
- Bruce Springsteen – producer
- Steven Van Zandt – producer
- Neil Dorfsman – engineer, mixing on "Club Soul City" and "Last Time"
- Gary Rindfuss – assistant engineer
- Josh Abbey – assistant engineer
- Toby Scott – mixing
- Dana Brisbee – assistant mixing
