= Out of Work (song) =

Single by Gary U.S. Bonds

from the album On the Line
- B-side: "Bring Her Back"
- Released: June 1982
- Length: 2:53
- Label: EMI America
- Songwriter: Bruce Springsteen
- Producer: Bruce Springsteen

Gary U.S. Bonds singles chronology
"It's Only Love" (1981)	"Out of Work" (1982)	"Soul Deep" (1982)

"Out of Work" is a 1982 song by American singer Gary U.S. Bonds, from his album On the Line. The song was written by Bruce Springsteen and became a moderate hit in the United States.

In 2020, Bonds released an online version of the song tailored to the COVID-19 pandemic.

== Chart performance ==
"Out of Work" reached No. 21 on the Billboard Hot 100 in August 1982. It also reached No. 10 on the Billboard Rock Tracks chart and No. 82 on the R&B chart. In Canada, the song reached #22.

== Reception ==
Writing in The Boston Phoenix, Sally Cragin said that "Out of Work harkens most conventionally to early protest song history. With a spirited lift-your-burdens R&B beat, the song has an admirable plainspokedness. -- Bonds isn't angry so much as energized."
