= Playing for Keeps (Big Twist and the Mellow Fellows album) =

Studio album by Big Twist and the Mellow Fellows
- Released: 1983
- Recorded: 1983
- Genre: Blues, R&B, soul
- Label: Alligator
- Producer: Gene Barge, Pete Special

Big Twist and the Mellow Fellows chronology
One Track Mind (1982)	Playing for Keeps (1983)	Live from Chicago! Bigger Than Life !! (1987)

Playing for Keeps is the third album by the American band Big Twist and the Mellow Fellows, released in 1983. They supported it with a North American tour.

== Production ==
The album was produced by Gene Barge and the band's guitarist, Pete Special. The Mellow Fellows had spent January 1983 auditioning new band members rather than relying on studio musicians. "300 Pounds of Heavenly Joy" was written by Willie Dixon. "Polk Salad Annie" is a cover of the Tony Joe White standard. "Just One Woman" employed an ensemble of female backing singers.

== Critical reception ==
Professional ratings
Review scores
Source	Rating
The Albuquerque Tribune	A
All Music Guide to the Blues	4/5 stars
The Encyclopedia of Popular Music	3/5 stars
Lincoln Journal Star	4/5 stars
MusicHound Blues: The Essential Album Guide	3/5 stars
The Penguin Guide to Blues Recordings	2.5/4 stars
The Philadelphia Inquirer	3/5 stars
Valley Advocate	4/5 stars

The Philadelphia Inquirer said that Twist "sings with big, bellowing enthusiasm as his Mellow Fellows rock out a swinging, horn-heavy bluster of rhythm and blues." The Journal News likened the band to "Howlin' Wolf meets a heavily-chopped r&b outfit." The Tucson Citizen praised the "gravelly quality" and "sly wink" of Twist's voice.

The Lincoln Journal Star called Playing for Keeps "a good, pushy soul LP." The Albuquerque Tribune noted the "dynamite" horn section. The Valley Advocate stated that "the ensemble work is very tight". The Boston Globe admired "the menacing funk" of "I Brought the Blues on Myself".

== Track listing ==
No.	Title	Length
1.	"300 Pounds of Heavenly Joy"
2.	"Flip Flop"
3.	"I Want Your Love"
4.	"Polk Salad Annie"
5.	"Pouring Water on a Drowning Man"
6.	"I Got a Problem"
7.	"I Brought the Blues on Myself"
8.	"We're Gonna Make It"
9.	"Just One Woman"
