= Quarter to Three =

Single by Gary U.S. Bonds

from the album Dance 'Til Quarter To Three With U.S. Bonds
- B-side: "Time Ole Story"
- Released: May 1961
- Genre: Rock and roll
- Length: 2:31
- Label: Legrand
- Songwriters: Gene Barge; Frank J. Guida; Joseph F. Royster; Gary Anderson
- Producer: Frank J. Guida

Gary U.S. Bonds singles chronology
"Not Me" (1961)	"Quarter to Three" (1961)	"School Is Out" (1961)

"Quarter to Three" is a popular song, adapted and expanded from "A Night with Daddy 'G' – Part 1" (Legrand LEG 1004), an instrumental by the Church Street Five, which was written by Gene Barge, Frank Guida and Joseph Royster, and sung by Gary U.S. Bonds. "Quarter to Three" appears on The Rock and Roll Hall of Fame's 500 Songs that Shaped Rock and Roll list.

== Background ==
The 45 rpm single of "A Night with Daddy 'G'" identifies the composers by their last names only – Barge, Guida, Royster – and identifies the music publisher as Pepe Music (BMI). The Legrand Records 45 release of the vocal "Quarter to Three" version adds "Anderson" to the author credits (on some record releases), since that was Bonds' birthname and he supplied the vocal arrangement.

The single was recorded with very rough sound quality (compared to other records at the time). Producer Frank Guida has been quoted on subsequent CD reissues that his production sound was exactly what he wanted it to sound like. Noted British producer and columnist Jack Good felt compelled to devote his entire Disc magazine column to praising the "fuzzy, muzzy, and distorted" sound of the U.S. Bonds hit release. The article was subtitled "This record could never have been made in Britain". There have been books written, such as those of the series Rock On: The Illustrated Encyclopedia of Rock N' Roll by Norm N. Nite, that have stated that this record was recorded "accidentally" (that no one knew the tape recorder was on at a session). In actuality, it was recorded at Sewell's Point Studio in Norfolk, Virginia and the background was completely intentional.

Members of the Church Street Five (otherwise known as Gene Barge's band) played on this and all of the other Legrand and S.P.Q.R releases, including Jimmy Soul's sides. Members of this group included Ron "Junior" Farley on bass, Willie Burnell on piano, Leonard Barks on trombone, Emmet Shields on drums, and Gene Barge on sax. Eric Shauls and Wayne Beckner also played guitar on this record and various other records produced by Frank Guida (Earl Swanson played the sax solo on this side as well).

== Chart performance ==
The song became a number-one hit on the Billboard Hot 100 in the United States on June 26, 1961, and remained there for two weeks. On the Hot R&B Sides chart it went to number 3. The UK release on Top Rank International JAR 575 reached number 7 in the UK chart on September 2, 1961. In this release and the original release in the United States, the record's B-side is "Time Ole Story" (Beckner).

== Later versions ==
- Bill Wyman of the Rolling Stones included the song on his 1976 solo album Stone Alone.
- The song was sung regularly by Bruce Springsteen as a show closer on the Born to Run tours and the Darkness Tour appearing on the Hammersmith Odeon London '75 concert document and, as performed in 1979, the No Nukes film.
- Clarence Clemons performed the song with Ringo Starr & His All-Starr Band in 1989. His recording of the song appears on the album A Night with Mr. C, released in 1989.

== Song influence ==
- In his book The Wanderer, Dion DiMucci stated that "Quarter to Three" was the inspiration for his hit "Runaround Sue", which was written by Dion and Ernie Maresca and which also peaked at #1 on the Hot 100.
- The lyric "Where else can you do a half a million things all at a Quarter to Three?" from the Huey Lewis and the News song The Heart of Rock & Roll was inspired by "Quarter to Three".
- The melody from "Dear Future Husband", a 2015 hit by Meghan Trainor, is inspired by the melodies from both "Quarter to Three" and "Runaround Sue".
- The song is referenced in the Ernie Maresca solo hit "Shout! Shout! (Knock Yourself Out)" (1962).

== See also ==
- List of Hot 100 number-one singles of 1961 (U.S.)
