= Big Twist and the Mellow Fellows =

American blues and R&B group

- Genres: Rhythm and blues
- Years active: 1970s - 1980s
- Labels: Flying Fish Records, Red Lightnin', Alligator Records, Sonet Records
- Spinoffs: Chicago Rhythm and Blues Kings

Big Twist and the Mellow Fellows was an American blues and rhythm and blues group.

== Background ==
The frontman was singer, drummer and harmonica player Lawrence "Big Twist" Nolan (né Lawrence Millard Nolan; 23 September 1937, Terre Haute, Indiana – 14 March 1990, Broadview, Illinois). He began singing in church at the age of six. In the mid to late 1950s he moved to Colp, Illinois and began singing and played drums in a bar band, the Mellow Fellows, performing everything from R & B, blues and country music. At the beginning of the 1970s he joined with guitarist Pete Special and tenor saxophonist Terry Ogolini, and the band put out albums on Flying Fish Records and Alligator Records. Over the decade, the group earned a loyal following and moved from private parties to the big stages. Big Twist and the Mellows success led them to appear on national television programs, including having their music videos for “300 Pounds of Heavenly Joy” and “Too Much BBQ” appear on the USA network and MTV. Big Twist toured with the Band, B.B. King, Muddy Waters and many other notable acts. The band's repertoire was a mixture of soul, rhythm and blues, and rock, a mixture that was equally popular among young and old.

The group was managed by Ron Kaplan.

== Career ==
Bu May 1982, the group's "One Track Mind album had been released in the UK on Red Lightenin' RL 0040.

Saxophonist Gene Barge joined the group after he toured with the Rolling Stones in Europe during 1982.

It was reported by Billboard in the magazine's 1 October 1983 issue that Alligator Records had launched their first video clip. It was filmed at the Crystal Ballroom of Chicago's Blackstone Hotel. The production and direction of the clip was overseen by Michael Dawson. In the clip, Big Twist and the band changed the vibe of what appeared to be a stuffy cocktail event into a party of r&b fanatics. The clip was "300 Pounds of Heavenly Joy", which was from the group's Playing for Keeps album.

The group recorded the single, "300 Pounds of Heavenly Joy" bw "Pouring Water on a Drowning Man". By January 1984, it was released in the UK on Sonet SON 2262.

The group's fourth album, Live from Chicago!, Bigger Than Life was released in 1987. It was reviewed in the November issue of Down Beat, where it received four stars. The reviewer said that it was possibly their best album. Nelson George of Billboard called it a Good house-rocking record and said that the band wasn't original but it was fun, giving "300 Pounds Of Heavenly Joy" as an example of that fun.

Big Twist & The Mellow Fellows and another act, The Van Dorens played at the Celebrate Brooklyn festival on 17 July 1988.

It was reported in the 20 November 1992 issue of Cash Box that Big Twist & The Mellow Fellows were one of the nominees for the 15th annual NAACP Image Awards.

== Later years and legacy ==
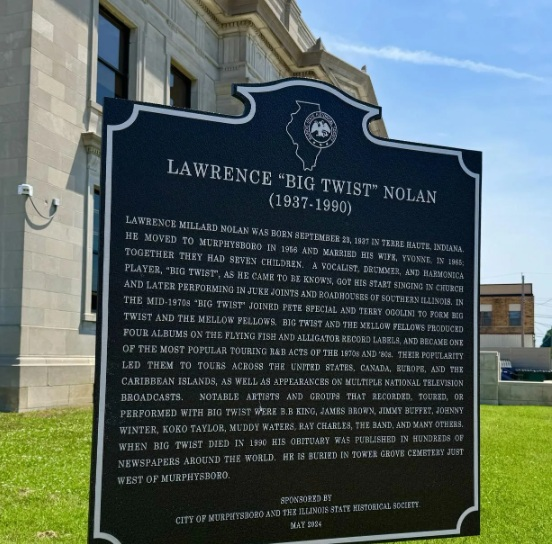
Historic Marker for Lawrence Big Twist Nolan in Murphysboro Illinois

Big Twist (no one who actually knew him ever called him "Larry"; according to a former BTMF Stage Manager, bassist Tango West - his nephew - called him "Uncle Twist") died in March 1990 of a heart attack. The Illinois State Historic Association placed a marker dedicated to the life of Big Twist on the Court House Lawn in Murphysboro, Illinois. The group played on, with new singer Martin Allbritton, from Carbondale, Illinois. The saxophonist and producer Gene "Daddy G" Barge often appeared as a guest vocalist. After the founding member Peter Special left the band, they called themselves the Chicago Rhythm And Blues Kings, and remain a popular band in Illinois.

== Members ==
- Gene Barge
- Tim Caron
- Melvin Crisp
- Larry "Big Twist" Nolan
- Terry Ogolini
- Bob Pina
- Pete Special
- Jon Stocklin

== Discography ==
- 1980 Big Twist & The Mellow Fellows (Flying Fish Records)
- 1982 One Track Mind (Flying Fish Records)
- 1983 Playing for Keeps (Alligator Records)
- 1987 Live from Chicago! - Bigger Than Life !! (Alligator Records)
- 1990 Street Party (Alligator Records)
