= School Is Out =

Song written by Gary U.S. Bonds and Gene Barge

Single by Gary U.S. Bonds

from the album Dance 'Til Quarter to Three with U. S. Bonds
- B-side: "One Million Tears"
- Released: July 1961
- Genre: R&B, rock & roll
- Length: 2:36
- Label: Legrand
- Songwriters: Gary U.S. Bonds, Gene Barge

Gary U.S. Bonds singles chronology
"Quarter to Three" (1961)	"School Is Out" (1961)	"School Is In" (1961)

"School Is Out" is a song written by Gary U.S. Bonds and Gene Barge and performed by Bonds. It reached #5 on the U.S. pop chart and #12 on the U.S. R&B chart in 1961. It was featured on his 1961 album Dance 'Til Quarter to Three with U. S. Bonds.

The song ranked #54 on Billboard magazine's Top 100 singles of 1961.

The song is referenced in the Ernie Maresca song "Shout! Shout! (Knock Yourself Out)" (1962).

== Other versions ==
- Ray Ellis and His Orchestra released a version of the song on their 1961 album Ray Ellis Plays the Top 20.
- Ry Cooder released a version of the song on his 1977 album Show Time.
- Tonio K. released a version of the song on his 1981 EP School Is Out.
