= Dedication (Gary U.S. Bonds album) =

Studio album by Gary U.S. Bonds
- Released: April 1981
- Recorded: 1980
- Genre: Rock, pop
- Length: 41:30
- Label: EMI America Records; Razor & Tie; BGO Records
- Producer: Steven Van Zandt; Bruce Springsteen; Gary U.S. Bonds; Rob Parissi

Gary U.S. Bonds chronology
Twist Up Calypso (1962)	Dedication (1981)	On the Line (1982)

Singles from Dedication
- 1. "This Little Girl" Released: April 1981; 2. "Jolé Blon" Released: July 1981; 3. "Your Love" Released: Oct 1981

Dedication is a 1981 album by American singer Gary U.S. Bonds.

The album was a critical and commercial success, marking a comeback for Bonds after several years out of the limelight. Dedication was the first of two albums on which he collaborated with Bruce Springsteen & the E Street Band, the second being On the Line, released the following year, 1982. The musicians accompanying Bonds on the album include many members of the E Street Band and the Asbury Jukes. The album includes three songs written by Bruce Springsteen, one written by Steven Van Zandt, and several covers of songs from the Beatles, Bob Dylan, Jackson Browne, and others. It also features a duet between Bonds and Springsteen on the track "Jolé Blon". Bonds' early 1960s sound had been a major influence on both Springsteen and Van Zandt. The songs written by Springsteen, as well as the cover of "Jolé Blon", were originally intended for his 1980 album, The River, but he felt they fit better with Bonds and his versions of them have never been released although he has performed most of them live, often featuring Bonds as a special guest.

The album produced several singles. The Springsteen-penned "This Little Girl" was a major success, peaking at No. 7 in Cash Box and at No. 11 on the Billboard pop chart. It also reached No. 5 on the mainstream rock chart, as well as the Cajun traditional "Jolé Blon", which garnered some album-oriented rock airplay. The album itself reached No. 27 on the pop album chart and No. 34 on the R&B album chart.

The album was re-released in 1994 on the Razor Edge label of Razor & Tie music, and then again in 2009 on BGO Records, paired with On the Line.

In a 2016 career retrospective interview with Pods & Sods, Bonds revealed that a few additional songs and outtakes recorded during this time may eventually be released.

== Critical reception ==
Professional ratings
Review scores
Source	Rating
AllMusic	3.5/5 stars
Christgau's Record Guide	C+
The Rolling Stone Record Guide	4/5 stars

Music writer Dave Marsh called Dedication "one of the most successful comeback albums in rock & roll history".

== Track listing ==
No.	Title	Length
1.	"Jolé Blon" (Traditional; arranged by Moon Mullican)	3:25
2.	"This Little Girl" (Bruce Springsteen)	3:42
3.	"Your Love" (Springsteen)	3:28
4.	"Dedication" (Springsteen)	3:11
5.	"Daddy's Come Home" (Steven Van Zandt)	6:22
6.	"It's Only Love" (John Lennon, Paul McCartney)	3:04
7.	"The Pretender" (Jackson Browne)	6:12
8.	"Way Back When" (Gary U.S. Bonds, George Bruno)	3:58
9.	"From a Buick 6" (Bob Dylan)	4:25
10.	"Just Like a Child" (Bonds, John Clemente, Lou Conte)	3:43

== Personnel ==
Musicians:

- Gary U.S. Bonds – lead vocals
- Bruce Springsteen – guitars, backing vocals (solo "Jolé Blon")
- Steven Van Zandt – bass, fuzz bass, guitar, bongos, backing vocals
- Roy Bittan – keyboards
- Clarence Clemons – saxophone, backing vocals
- Danny Federici – accordion, keyboards
- Garry Tallent – bass
- Max Weinberg – drums
- Additional musicians:
  - Chuck Jackson & Ben E. King – vocals
  - Ellie Greenwich, Carol Williams, Ula Hedwig, Brenda Hilliard, Carole Sylvan, Brenda Joyce Hillard, & Mikie Harris – backing vocals
  - John Clemente – bass
  - Rusty Cloud – keyboards
  - Lou Conte & Rob Parissi – guitar
  - Rick Gazda – trumpet, backing vocals
  - Richie Rosenberg – trombone
  - Eddie Manion – tenor saxophone
  - Mike Micara – drums
  - Michael Spengler – trumpet
  - Joey Stann – baritone saxophone, backing vocals

Production:

- Gary U.S. Bonds, Bruce Springsteen, Steven Van Zandt, Rob Parissi, Lanny Lambert – producers
- Garry Tallent – producer, associate producer
- Larry Alexander, Tony Bongiovi, Bob Clearmountain, Neil Dorfsman, Bill Scheniman – engineers
- Raymond Willhard, Dave Greenberg, Jeffry Hendirkcson, Garry Rindfuss – assistant engineers
- Larry Emerine & Stephen Marcussen – mastering
- Jimmy Wachtel – design, photography
- Gloria Von Jansky – hand lettering
- Dane Lawing – art direction
