= Chicken Skin Music =

Studio album by Ry Cooder
- Released: 1976
- Studio: Warner Bros. Recording Studios, North Hollywood; "Yellow Roses" and "Chloe" recorded in Hawaii
- Genre: Americana; roots rock; blues; country; Tex-Mex
- Length: 39:37
- Label: Reprise
- Producer: Ry Cooder

Ry Cooder chronology
Paradise and Lunch (1974)	Chicken Skin Music (1976)	Show Time (1977)

Singles from Chicken Skin Music
- 1. "He'll Have to Go / The Bourgeois Blues" Released: 1976

Song sample
- "Yellow Roses" sample: file; help

Professional ratings
Review scores
Source	Rating
Allmusic	link
Christgau's Record Guide	B
Rolling Stone	(favorable) link

Chicken Skin Music is Ry Cooder's fifth studio album, released in 1976, on the Reprise label.

== Reception ==
Reviewing the album for AllMusic, Brett Hartenbach said: "Even more than usual, Cooder refuses to recognize borders – geographical or musical – presenting "Stand By Me" as a gospel song with a norteño arrangement, or giving the Jim Reeves country-pop classic, "He'll Have to Go," a bolero rhythm, featuring the interplay of Flaco Jimenez's accordion and Pat Rizzo's alto sax. [...] This is not merely eclecticism for its own sake. Chicken Skin Music is probably Ry Cooder's most eccentric record since his first, but it's also one of his most entertaining."

Writing for ZigZag magazine in November 1976, Andy Childs said: "Apart from the obvious quality of his music, there's something about his total detachment from the very formalised and generally uninspiring rock'n'roll circus that I find very appealing. ... There's so much music here, so much fascinating and enlightening music. How many so-called artists can really claim to make albums that are truly both educational and so immensely enjoyable?" Time magazine once said that "Ry Cooder makes America come together in its music...well, now he's stretching his musical horizons to other shores, and the results, even though he's probably just begun, are just as cohesive...a pure joy – a work of art even."

== Track listing ==
Side one
No.	Title	Writer(s)	Length
1.	"The Bourgeois Blues"	Lead Belly	3:22
2.	"I Got Mine"	Traditional; based on Pink Anderson's version	4:28
3.	"Always Lift Him Up/Kanaka Wai Wai"	Blind Alfred Reed/Traditional	6:01
4.	"He'll Have to Go"	Joe Allison, Audrey Allison	5:07

Side two
No.	Title	Writer(s)	Length
5.	"Smack Dab in the Middle"	Charles E. Calhoun	3:18
6.	"Stand by Me"	Ben E. King, Jerry Leiber, Mike Stoller	3:38
7.	"Yellow Roses"	Ken Devine, Sam Nichols	6:11
8.	"Chlo-e" (instrumental)	Gus Kahn, Neil Moret	3:00
9.	"Goodnight, Irene"	Lead Belly, John Lomax	4:32

== Personnel ==
=== Musicians ===
- George Bohanon – baritone horn and horn arrangement on "I Got Mine"
- Oscar Brashear – cornet on "I Got Mine"
- Red Callender – upright bass
- Ry Cooder – bajo sexto, mandolin, mandola, bottleneck guitar, French accordion, electric guitar, slack-key guitar, tiple, Hawaiian guitar, vocals
- Chris Ethridge – bass guitar
- Jimmy Adams – vocals
- Terry Evans – vocals
- Cliff Givens – vocals
- Laurence Fishburne – vocals
- Hugo Gonzales – bajo sexto on "Good Night Irene"
- Milt Holland – percussion, drums
- Atta Isaacs – slack-key and acoustic guitar on "Chloe"
- Fred Jackson Jr. – tenor saxophone on "I Got Mine"
- Flaco Jiménez – accordion on "He'll Have to Go", "Stand By Me" and "Goodnight Irene"
- Herman E. Johnson – vocals
- Jim Keltner – drums
- Bobby King – vocals
- Henry Ojeda – bass on "Good Night Irene"
- Gabby Pahinui – steel guitar on "Yellow Roses" and "Chloe"
- Benny Powell – trombone on "I Got Mine"
- Pat Rizzo – alto saxophone on "He'll Have to Go"
- Russ Titelman – bajo sexto on "Stand By Me"
- Frank Villarreal – alto saxophone on "Good Night Irene"
- Isaac Garcia – drums on "Good Night Irene"

=== Technical ===
- Ry Cooder – producer
- Judy Maizel, Trudy Portch – production coordination
- Lee Herschberg – engineer, mixing
- Lloyd Cruft – engineer
- Bobby Hata, John Neal – assistant engineers
- Chet Himes, John Ingle – engineering
- Kenny Price – album cover, design and painting
- Susan Titelman – photography
- Noel Newbolt – production assistance

== Releases ==
- CD Chicken Skin Music Reprise 1988
- Cassette Chicken Skin Music Reprise 1990
- CD Chicken Skin Music Reprise 1990
- CD Chicken Skin Music WEA 2007
- CD Chicken Skin Music Reprise 2008

== Singles ==
- "He'll Have To Go" / "The Bourgeois Blues", Reprise: K 14457 (UK)
- "Goodnight Irene" / "Chloe", Reprise: K REP14473 (Netherlands)

== Charts ==
=== Album ===
Year	Chart	Peak
1976	Australian (Kent Music Report)	80
1976	Billboard Pop Albums	177
