= Frank Guida =

Sicilian-American songwriter and music producer (1922–2007)

- Born: May 26, 1922; Palermo, Sicily, Italy
- Died: May 19, 2007 (aged 84) Virginia Beach, Virginia, U.S.
- Occupations: Songwriter; music producer; retailer
- Labels: LeGrand; SPQR (among others)
- Spouse(s): Carmela "Millie" Guida (1942–2007)

Frank Joseph Guida (May 26, 1922 – May 19, 2007) was an Italian-American songwriter and independent music producer credited with creating what he dubbed the “Norfolk Sound." The “Norfolk Sound” was an amalgam of Guida’s roots in Calypso music, rhythm and blues, novel production techniques, an entirely original double-bass drumbeat, overmodulated party sound, and talented musicians steeped in jazz and rhythm and blues traditions. The distinct sound he created has been credited as influencing such major songwriters and producers as Bruce Springsteen, Phil Spector, The Beatles, and Motown. Two of Guida’s hits, “New Orleans” and “Quarter to Three” were favorites of John Lennon’s. Guida’s recordings have been used in such films as Mask, Mermaids, Jaded, Chances Are, Clean and Sober, The Fabelmans, and Bikeriders.

== Early life and education ==
Guida was born in Palermo, Sicily on May 26, 1922. At age two, he immigrated with his family to The Bronx neighborhood of New York City where he grew up. He married his wife, Carmela (“Millie”) in 1942 in New York City prior to his enlistment in the U.S. Army for World War II. He was stationed at Port of Spain, Trinidad, where he became interested in calypso music and performed as the “Calypso Kid” in the USO.

== Early career ==
After the war, he returned to New York City and continued his singing career performing at calypso clubs in New York’s Harlem neighborhood. The Guidas moved to Norfolk, Virginia in 1953 and opened Frankie’s Birdland, a popular record store featuring jazz, R&B, and pop music records that became one of the most prominent retailers in the region. Guida also became active in the local music scene promoting and managing musical acts. He had a Friday night radio show on local station WLOW and hosted Frankie’s Jazz Workshop on WTOV-TV Channel 27.

== Later career: Songwriting and production ==
Not content merely selling records, Guida decided to start making them as well. “I decided that if I was going to make a success it would have to be by productions that make other people a success,” he told a music historian.

It was a former backing musician for Gene Vincent, Tommy Facenda who performed Guida’s first hit with the novelty record “High School USA.” Guida cut twenty-eight different regional versions of the song, each mentioning a different local high school. The gimmick worked and the record made the national Top 30 in November 1959.

The following year Guida bought his own studio and established a cast of regular session men, including tenor saxman Gene “Daddy G” Barge, who would form the backbone of what became known as “The Norfolk Sound”.

Guida discovered and recorded a Norfolk singer, Gary Anderson, and, noticing a poster urging Americans to buy U.S. bonds, changed the vocalist’s name to U.S. Bonds as a gimmick to get disk jockeys to play the recording on air. With a song that Guida had co-written with Joseph Royster called “New Orleans,” and with a studio technique that created what Professor Terry Pender, technical director of the Columbia University Computer Music Centre, has called “a strange outdoor sound featuring double-tracked vocals squeezed to the hilt with compression”, Guida was rewarded with a Top 10 hit. “New Orleans” reached #5 on the Billboard Hot 100 in the summer of 1960.

Further hits followed. In 1961, Guida had his first #1 hit with “Quarter to Three” by Bonds. “Quarter to Three” is listed by the Rock and Roll Hall of Fame Museum as one of the 500 songs that shaped rock and roll. That recording was cowritten by Guida, Royster, Barge, and Anderson. Guida and Bonds (Anderson) had several more billboard hits in 1961-1962, including School Is Out, Dear Lady Twist, and Twist, Twist Senora.

Guida again had a #1 hit in 1963 with “If You Wanna Be Happy” co-written by Joe Royster and Guida's wife Millie Guida. In making this record, Guida looked back on his music experience in Trinidad with singer James McLeese (whom he renamed Jimmy Soul).

Following those successes, he continued to record what he termed “black pop” by artists such as Lenis Guess, Barbara Redd, and Oliver Christian, who was known as “the Soul Cop.”

Guida released more than four hundred records on various labels until the 1980s and lived to see his records become pop music standards. Springsteen’s interest in the music also helped to rekindle Gary U.S. Bond’s career and many of Guida’s productions were reissued on CD in the U.S. and U.K.

Guida also owned a number of record labels, including Legrand and SPQR.

== Personal life ==
Guida and his wife, Carmela (“Millie”) were married for almost 65 years until his death. Millie also grew up in New York City and graduated from Evander Childs High School. While in school, she attracted the attention of her teachers for her extraordinary singing voice and was strongly encouraged to study voice at New York’s Juilliard School. However, World War II and marriage put her on a different path. Guida and his wife had three children. He died in Virginia Beach, Virginia in 2007.

== Other career highlights ==
He was an advocate for the local and national Italian American community, a business leader, and at times an outspoken business representative at Norfolk’s City Council meetings. For his work in promoting cultural and business ties between the United States and Italy, he was awarded the title of “Cavaliere” by the Italian Republic, the equivalent of a knighthood.

In addition to Birdland, Guida Also owned a second popular record shop, “Frankie’s Got It”, on Granby Street in Norfolk, Virginia from the late 1960’s to 1989. He is also honored with a star on the “Legends of Music Walk of Fame” on Granby Street in downtown Norfolk across the street from the former location of “Frankie’s Got It.
