= The Continental Twist =

1961 film

- Directed by: William J. Hole, Jr.
- Starring: Louis Prima; June Wilkinson
- Distributed by: American International Pictures (US)
- Release date: 1961
- Country: USA
- Language: English

The Continental Twist (also known as Twist All Night) is a 1961 film featuring the twist dance.

== Plot ==
A group of musicians are concerned when it appears that they will be evicted from their nightclub. Musician Louis Evans and girlfriend Jenny Watson accidentally encounter a group of art thieves.

== Cast ==
- Louis Prima as Louis Evans
- June Wilkinson as Jenny
- Gertrude Michael as Letitia
- Sam Butera as himself
