= Playing for Keeps (song) =

Single by Elvis Presley
- A-side: "Too Much"
- Released: January 4, 1957
- Recorded: September 1, 1956
- Genre: Ballad
- Length: 2:50
- Songwriter: Stan Kesler

Elvis Presley singles chronology
"Love Me Tender" / "Anyway You Want Me" (1957)	"Too Much" / "Playing for Keeps" (1957)	"All Shook Up" (1957)

Professional ratings
Review scores
Source	Rating
Billboard	"Spotlight" pick, "This Week's Best Buys" pick

"Playing for Keeps" is a song originally recorded by Elvis Presley. Its first release on record was on January 4, 1957, on a single with "Too Much" on the other side. "Playing for Keeps" reached number 34 in the United States, while "Too Much" spent 3 weeks at number 1. In 1959, the song was included on Elvis's album For LP Fans Only (an unusual album for Presley because all the songs on it had been already released one to almost five years prior).

== Writing and recording history ==
The song was written by Sun Studio house band steel guitar and bass player Stan Kesler (words and lyrics), who wrote or co-wrote five songs in total for Elvis Presley: "I'm Left, You're Right, She's Gone", "I Forgot to Remember to Forget", "Thrill of Your Love", "Playing for Keeps", and "If I'm a Fool (For Loving You)". Elvis recorded it on September 1, 1956, at the Radio Recorders Studio in Hollywood, California (at the studio sessions for RCA Victor that were held at Radio Recorders on September 1–3). The master recording of "Playing for Keeps" is a splice of two takes: take 7 with the ending from take 18.

== Commercial performance and critical reception ==
Preorders for the single "Too Much" / "Playing For Keeps" reached almost 500,000 copies. Billboard picked the single "Two Much"/"Playing for Keep" for its "Spotlight" section and then (in its January 19, 1957, issue) as one of "This Week's Best Buys":

Advance orders put this disk in the best seller class even before it was generally available. [...] It doesn't take genius to see that this will be a chart record shortly. At this early stage, it is hard to determine which side rates top listing. The Presley fans are giving both tunes quite a whirl; both are propelling it forward.

Mike Eder states his opinion of the side "Playing for Keeps" in his book Elvis Music FAQ: All That's Left to Know About the King's Recorded Works:

"Playing for Keeps" is one of the few early single sides that wasn't worthy of the spotlight it was given. He tries too hard at putting feeling into the track, pushing his voice into an awkward whine. Elvis didn't yet possess the kind of big voice he wanted for ballads like this, but you can't blame him for trying to go beyond his comfort zone.

== Track listings ==
7-inch single (RCA 47–6800, 4 January 1957)

1. "Too Much"
2. "Playing for Keeps"

7-inch EP Playing for Keeps (RCA EPA 9561, Germany)

1. "Playing for Keeps"
2. "Too Much"
3. "Wear My Ring Around Your Neck"
4. "Doncha' Think It's Time"

7-inch EP All Shook Up (RCA 75.405, France)

1. "All Shook Up"
2. "That's When Your Heartaches Begin"
3. "Too Much"
4. "Playing for Keeps"

== Charts ==
Chart (1957)	Peak position
"Playing for Keeps"
U.S. Billboard Most Played by Jockeys	21
U.S. Billboard Top 100	34
U.S. Cash Box Magazine Top Singles	33
"Too Much" / "Playing for Keeps"
U.S. Billboard Most Played C&W in Juke Boxes	8
U.S. Billboard Best Sellers in Stores	1
U.S. Billboard Most Played in Juke Boxes	1

== See also ==
- List of Billboard number-one singles of 1957
