= Twist, Twist Senora =

Single by Gary U.S. Bonds

from the album Twist Up Calypso
- B-side: "Food of Love"
- Released: March 1962
- Genre: Calypso, R&B
- Length: 2:35
- Label: Legrand
- Songwriters: Frank Guida, Gene Barge, Joseph Royster
- Producer: Frank Guida

Gary U.S. Bonds singles chronology
"Dear Lady Twist" (1961)	"Twist, Twist Senora" (1962)	"Seven Day Weekend" (1962)

"Twist, Twist Senora" is a song written by Frank Guida, Gene Barge, and Joseph Royster and performed by Gary U.S. Bonds. It reached #9 on the U.S. pop chart in 1962. It was featured on his 1962 album Twist Up Calypso.

The song took its inspiration from the calypso song "Jump in the Line (Shake, Señora)".

The song was produced by Frank Guida.

The song ranked #88 on Billboard magazine's Top 100 singles of 1962.

== Other versions ==
- A version by Burt Blanca was released on the 2008 various artists album Rock N France: Platinum Collection.
