= Joe Henderson (gospel singer) =

American R&B and gospel singer (1937–1964)

Joe Henderson (April 24, 1937 – October 25, 1964) was an American R&B and gospel singer, best known for his 1962 recording of "Snap Your Fingers".

Henderson was born in Como, Mississippi, United States, and raised in Gary, Indiana. After working in gospel music, he signed with Todd Records in 1958. In 1962, he recorded "Snap Your Fingers" which became a big hit on both the pop and R&B chart. He charted three other sides within the next two years, "Big Love" [Todd 1077, 1962], "The Searching Is Over" [Todd 1079, 1962], and "You Take One Step (I'll Take Two) [Todd 1096, 1964]. In between the latter two, he continued recording without further chart success.

== Death ==
Henderson died on October 25, 1964, of a heart attack at the age of 27, at his apartment in Nashville, Tennessee.

His roommate, singer Arthur Alexander, found Henderson's body after returning from a stageshow in Athens, Georgia.

Henderson had recently signed with Ric Records, which issued a posthumous single ("River or the Railroad Track / I Ain't Never") in November 1964 and another in 1965.

== Studio album ==
Snap Your Fingers, which contains the one-hit wonder of the same name and Big Love, was Henderson's only studio album.

Snap Your Fingers

Studio album by Joe Henderson
- Released: 1962
- Recorded: 1962
- Genre: R&B
- Label: 28:31
- Producer: Paul Cohen

Singles from Snap Your Fingers
- 1. "Snap Your Fingers" Released: April 28, 1962; 2. "Big Love" Released: August 13, 1962

Side one

1. "Snap Your Fingers" – 2:55
2. "Sad Teardrops at Dawn" – 2:20
3. "Three Steps" – 2:30
4. "Cause We're in Love" – 2:31
5. "Baby Don't Leave Me" – 2:35
6. "Just Call Me" – 3:04

Side two

1. "Big Love" – 2:05
2. "After Loving You" – 2:57
3. "Love Me" – 2:13
4. "You Can't Lose" – 2:20
5. "If You See Me Cry" – 2:31
6. "Right Now" – 2:30

== See also ==
- 27 Club
