= Snap Your Fingers =

1962 single by Joe Henderson

Single by Joe Henderson

from the album Snap Your Fingers
- B-side: "If You See Me Cry"
- Released: 1962
- Genre: R&B
- Length: 2:55
- Label: Todd
- Songwriters: Grady Martin; Alex Zanetis
- Producer: Paul Cohen

Joe Henderson singles chronology
"Right Now" (1961)	"Snap Your Fingers" (1962)	"Big Love" (1962)

"Snap Your Fingers" is a song written by Grady Martin and Alex Zanetis. It was originally recorded by gospel singer Joe Henderson in 1962, whose version peaked at No. 2 on the R&B charts, and at No. 8 on the Hot 100. "Snap Your Fingers" also peaked at No. 5 on the Adult Contemporary chart.

== Other versions ==
Following Henderson's original version, two renditions charted on the Hot Country Songs charts in the 1970s. The first was by Dick Curless, who took a version to number 40 in 1971. Three years later, a rendition by Don Gibson peaked at number 12.

== Ronnie Milsap recording ==
"Snap Your Fingers"

Single by Ronnie Milsap

from the album Heart and Soul
- B-side: "This Time Last Year"
- Released: 1987
- Genre: Country
- Length: 3:03
- Label: RCA Victor
- Producers: Rob Galbraith, Kyle Lehning

Ronnie Milsap singles chronology
"How Do I Turn You On" (1986)	"Snap Your Fingers" (1987)	"Make No Mistake, She's Mine" (1987)

In 1987, Ronnie Milsap's version was his 32nd number one on the country chart as a solo artist. His rendition appears on his album Heart and Soul.
