= Ronnie & the Hi-Lites =

1960s doo-wop group

Ronnie & The Hi-Lites were an American doo-wop musical group, formed in Jersey City, New Jersey, United States, in the early 1960s. The group was originally called the Cascades, not to be confused with a different group of the same name. Initially consisting of tenors Sonny Caldwell and John Whitney, bass singer Kenny Overby and baritone Stanley Brown, the group added 12-year-old Ronnie Goodson as their lead singer. They were soon introduced to songwriter/producer team Marion and Hal Weiss, who offered them "I Wish That We Were Married".

On March 31, 1962, "I Wish That We Were Married", a slow ballad sung from the point of view of a young boy expressing his wishes that he and his sweetheart would stay together, charted and rose to number 16 on the Billboard Hot 100 chart, spending twelve weeks on the chart. Selling over half a million copies, the song put the band on the map, paving the way for performances alongside Stevie Wonder, Major Lance and Ronnie's girlfriend Eva Boyd, better known as Little Eva. They subsequently appeared on American Bandstand, at The Apollo and numerous venues throughout the east coast. "I Wish That We Were Married" is perhaps known for Ronnie's emotional sobbing, adding to the theme of the song.

The small independent record label, Joy Records, picked up the group's recording and renamed the ensemble Ronnie & the Hi-Lites. They subsequently released the single and the group went on to record fifteen more singles, none reaching the charts.

Ronnie Goodson died in his sleep, from a brain tumor, at the age of 33 on November 4, 1980.
