= Dear Lady Twist =

Single by Gary U.S. Bonds

from the album Twist Up Calypso
- B-side: "Havin' So Much Fun"
- Released: November 1961
- Genre: Calypso, R&B
- Length: 2:24
- Label: Legrand
- Songwriter: Frank Guida
- Producer: Frank Guida

Gary U.S. Bonds singles chronology
"School Is In" (1961)	"Dear Lady Twist" (1961)	"Twist, Twist Senora" (1962)

"Dear Lady Twist" is a song written and produced by Frank Guida, and performed by Gary U.S. Bonds. It reached #5 on the U.S. R&B chart and #9 on the U.S. pop chart in 1962. It was featured on his 1962 album Twist Up Calypso.

The song ranked #32 on Billboard magazine's Top 100 singles of 1962.

== Background ==
This song begins with a brief spoken dialogue, as Gary US Bonds asks a lady to dance the Twist with him, in which she replies that she does not know how to do it; the song itself becomes his reply. This song is also noted for the male backup singers repeating the phrase "Get up from your chair". The record was first released as "Dear Lady" in late 1961, but after the market frenzy associated with Chubby Checker's "The Twist", it was retitled "Dear Lady Twist" and re-released with that title in early 1962.

== Other versions ==
- Chubby Checker released a version of the song on his 1961 album, For 'Teen Twisters Only.
- Rod McKuen released a version of the song on his 1961 album Mr. Oliver Twist.
- Duane Eddy released a version of the song on his 1962 album Twistin' 'N' Twangin'.

== Popular culture ==
- This song's title and lyric line are referenced in the song "Mashed Potato Time" (1962) by Dee Dee Sharp.
