= Peppermint Twist =

1961 song by Joey Dee and the Starliters

- Dutch release picture sleeve

Single by Joey Dee and the Starliters

from the album Doin' the Twist at the Peppermint Lounge
- B-side: "Peppermint Twist (Part 2)"
- Released: 1961
- Genre: Rock and roll
- Length: 4:05 (Parts 1 and 2 combined)
- Label: Roulette
- Songwriters: Joey Dee, Henry Glover

Joey Dee and the Starliters singles chronology
"Face of an Angel" (1960)	"Peppermint Twist" (1961)	"Shout" (1962)

"Peppermint Twist" is a song written by Joey Dee and Henry Glover, recorded and released by Joey Dee and the Starliters in 1961. Capitalizing on the Twist dance craze and the nightclub in which Dee performed ("The Peppermint Lounge"), the song hit No.1 on the U.S. Billboard Hot 100 in early 1962. It replaced Chubby Checker's "The Twist", the song that sparked the Twist fad, at the No. 1 position.

It should not be confused with "The Peppermint Twist", which is a different song written by Danny Lamego, whose group Danny Peppermint and the Jumping Jacks had a #54 Billboard hit with it in December 1961. Danny Peppermint performed at that time at The Peppermint Lounge in Manhattan, after which both songs are named, as did Joey Dee And The Starliters who went on to have the bigger hit.

== Background ==
The lead singer in the Starliters' version is David Brigati, whose brother, Eddie Brigati, was a singer for 1960s rock band the (Young) Rascals.

The original recording of the song was considered too long for release on a 45 rpm single, so it was split into two parts. It was this first part, "Peppermint Twist (Part 1)", with a length of 2:03, which became the No.1 hit; the mostly instrumental second half of the recording is rarely heard today.

== Chart performance ==
Chart (1962)	Peak position
Canada CHUM Chart	3
New Zealand lever hit parade	1
UK Singles (The Official Charts Company)	33
US Billboard Hot 100	1
US Billboard Hot R&B Sides	8
US Cashbox Top 100 Singles	2

== Personnel ==
- David Brigati - lead vocals
- Billy Butler - guitar
- Don Martin - drums
- Carlton Lattimore - organ
- Jerome Richardson - sax

== The Sweet version ==
"Peppermint Twist"

Single by The Sweet

from the album Sweet Fanny Adams
- B-side: "Rebel Rouser"
- Released: 1974
- Recorded: January 1974
- Studio: Audio International Studios, London; Advision Studios, London
- Genre: Glam rock; bubblegum
- Length: 3:27
- Label: RCA
- Songwriters: Joey Dee, Henry Glover

The Sweet singles chronology
"Turn It Down" (1974)	"Peppermint Twist" (1974)	"Fox on the Run" (1975)

The song was covered by English glam rock band the Sweet on their second studio album Sweet Fanny Adams. It was released as a single in 1974, but only in Australia, New Zealand and Japan, reaching No. 4 on the weekly chart and No. 26 on the 1975 year end chart in the former.

A pop song with swirly vocal harmonies, "Peppermint Twist" is the last example of the band's early bubblegum sound. It has been criticized as out of place on Sweet Fanny Adams, a hard rock album.

=== Chart performance ===
Chart (1974)	Peak position
Australia (Kent Music Report)	4

=== Personnel ===
- Brian Connolly – lead vocals, handclaps^, tambourine^
- Steve Priest – bass guitar and 6-string bass^
- Mick Tucker – vocals, timpani^, tubular bells^, gong^, effects^ (drums is uncredited)
- Andy Scott – guitars, piano^, cello^

^credited only (uncredited)

== See also ==
- Twist songs
