= The Stripper =

Instrumental song

Single by David Rose & His Orchestra
- A-side: "Ebb Tide"
- B-side: "The Stripper"
- Released: May 1962
- Recorded: 1958
- Genre: Jazz
- Length: 1:57
- Label: MGM
- Songwriter: David Rose

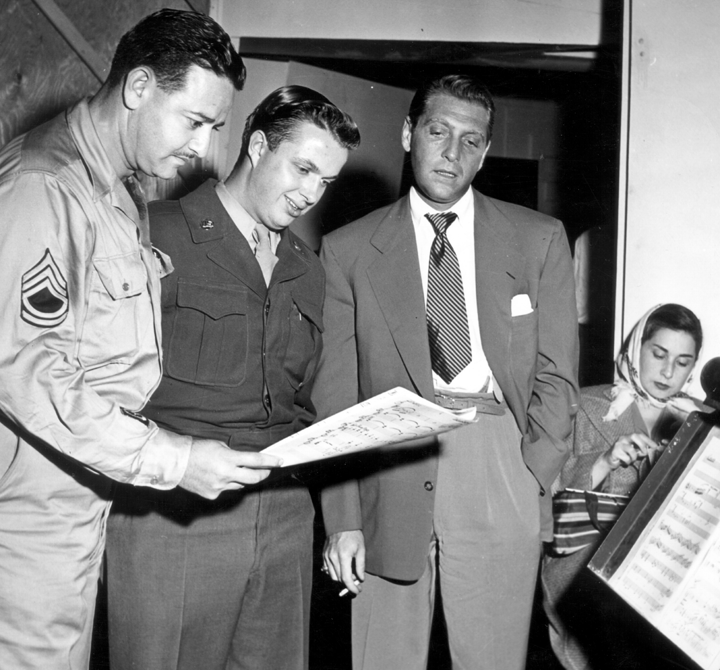
David Rose (standing on the right) in AFRS Radio Show, c. 1946

"The Stripper" is an instrumental composed by David Rose, recorded in 1958 and released four years later. It evinces a jazz influence with especially prominent trombone slides, and evokes the feel of music used to accompany striptease artists.

"The Stripper" reached No. 1 on Billboard's Hot 100 chart in July 1962. It became a gold record. Billboard ranked the record as the No. 5 song of 1962.

== Legacy ==
The piece was the theme melody in the Swedish record sales list Kvällstoppen in the 1960s. It also became known as the background music for a contemporary Noxzema Shaving Cream commercial, featuring Swedish model Gunilla Knutsson, and for key scenes in the films Scarecrow (1973) and Slap Shot (1977). The piece also features in the films The Full Monty (1997) and Wallace & Gromit: The Curse of the Were-Rabbit (2005). It was used on BBC Television in 1976 by the British comedians Morecambe and Wise in their "Breakfast Sketch" routine, where they perform a dance using various kitchen utensils and food items. It was also used on Match Game when Gene Rayburn or one of the panelists began "getting antsy". The band Mötley Crüe used The Stripper to introduce the show on their 1987's Girls, Girls, Girls-Tour as well as at the Moscow Music Peace Festival in 1989.

The comedy troupe Monty Python used the song in two skits on their show Monty Python's Flying Circus:

- A beachgoer (Terry Jones) is trying to change into a bathing suit on the beach, only to be exposed as he begins taking his clothes off. His last attempt finds him in front of an audience, to whom he gives a show. As the song ends, the words "It's a man's life, taking your clothes off in public" appear onscreen, echoing the episode's running gag about infringing on the British Army's recruitment slogan.
- An economic minister (Terry Jones) gives a report on the British economy while doing a striptease to the song.

The song was put into regular use for ITV's children's series SMTV Live from 1998 to 2003, most particularly during the "Strippin' Vicar" and "Chums" sketches when the vicars such as one of the hosts Ant McPartlin and one of the guests Frank Skinner destroy the set.

It was also used once on CBS-ABC game show Match Game which host Gene Rayburn and one of the celebrity panelists Betty White had a showdown.

Lyrics were added to the song in the Family Guy episode "The Peanut Butter Kid." In a cutaway gag, Peter Griffin's great-aunt, Queen of Burlesque Griffin, a stripper who performed circa the 1920s-1950s, sings anachronistically of how men's carnal desires were unsatisfied in the days before pornography was widely available.
