= Gary U.S. Bonds =

American R&B and rock and roll singer (born 1939)

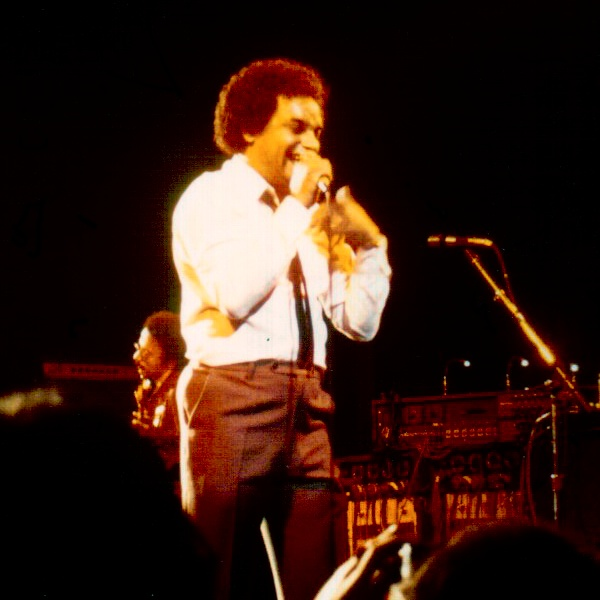
- Gary U.S. Bonds performing in 1981

Background information
- Born: Gary Levone Anderson; June 6, 1939 (age 87); Jacksonville, Florida, U.S.
- Genres: R&B; rock and roll; pop rock
- Occupations: Musician; singer; songwriter
- Instrument: Vocals
- Years active: 1956–present
- Labels: Legrand; Top Rank; Stateside; Razor & Tie; EMI; Sue
- Website: garyusbonds.com

Gary U.S. Bonds (born Gary Levone Anderson; June 6, 1939) is an American rhythm and blues and rock and roll singer, known for his hits "New Orleans" and "Quarter to Three".

== Career ==
Born in Jacksonville, Florida, Bonds lived in Norfolk, Virginia, in the 1950s when he began singing publicly in church and with a group called the Turks. He joined record producer Frank Guida's small Legrand Records label where Guida chose Anderson's stage name, U.S. Bonds, in hopes that it would be confused with a public service announcement advertising the sale of government bonds and thereby garner more DJ attention. In the October 24, 1960, edition of Billboard magazine, it states his name is "U.S. (Ullysses Samuel) Bonds". His first three singles and first album, Dance 'Til Quarter to Three, were released under the U.S. Bonds name, but people assumed it was the name of a group. To avoid confusion, subsequent releases, including his second album Twist Up Calypso, were made under the name Gary (U.S.) Bonds. The parentheses were discarded in the 1970s.

"Quarter to Three" sold one million records, earning a gold disc. Subsequent hits, under his modified name, included "School Is Out" (No. 5), "Dear Lady Twist" (No. 9), "School Is In" (No. 28) and "Twist, Twist Senora" (No. 9) in the early 1960s. His hits featured solos by the saxophonist Gene Barge.

"Quarter to Three" appears on The Rock and Roll Hall of Fame's 500 Songs that Shaped Rock and Roll list.

In the early 1980s, Bonds had a career resurgence with two albums, both of them recorded with Bruce Springsteen, Steven Van Zandt, and the E Street Band. Dedication was released in 1981, and On the Line followed in 1982. The albums spawned several hits including "This Little Girl" (his comeback hit in 1981, which reached No. 11 on the pop chart in Billboard and No. 5 on the mainstream rock chart), "Jolé Blon" and "Out of Work".

Bonds released an album in 2004 called Back in 20, the title referencing his repeated sporadic pop-ups of popularity (his first hits were in the 1960s, then again in the 1980s, and another significant album in the early 2000s, each 20-odd years apart). The album features guest appearances by Springsteen and Southside Johnny.

In 2009, he released a new album, Let Them Talk, and toured the UK as a special guest of Bill Wyman's Rhythm Kings. In 2010, Bonds contributed duet vocals on the song "Umbrella in My Drink" on Southside Johnny's album Pills and Ammo.

While Bonds is mostly known for achievements within rhythm and blues and rock and roll, some of his songs are equally at home in other genres; for example, "She's All I Got", co-written by Jerry Williams, Jr. (better known as Swamp Dogg), was nominated for the Country Music Association's "Song of the Year" in 1972 when it was a big hit for Johnny Paycheck. (Freddie North also charted his only pop hit with a soul cover of the same song.) Bonds is also a 1997 honoree of the Rhythm & Blues Foundation. He is an accomplished golfer and often played in celebrity PGA Tour events.

== Discography ==
=== Studio albums ===
Year	Album	Chart positions			
Year	Album	US	US R&B	AUS	UK
1961	Dance 'Til Quarter to Three with U.S Bonds	6	—	—	—
1962	Twist Up Calypso	—	—	—	—
1981	Dedication	27	34	27	43
1982	On the Line	52	—	92	55
1984	Standing in the Line of Fire	—	—	—	—
1996	Nothing Left to Lose	—	—	—	—
2004	Back in 20	—	—	—	—
2009	Let Them Talk	—	—	—	—
"—" denotes releases that did not chart.

=== Singles ===
Year	Title	Chart positions				Album
Year	Title	US Pop	US R&B	US Rock	UK	Album
1960	"New Orleans"	6	5	―	16	Dance 'Til Quarter to Three with U.S. Bonds
1961	"Not Me"	116	—	—	—	Dance 'Til Quarter to Three with U.S. Bonds
1961	"Quarter to Three"	1	3	―	7	Dance 'Til Quarter to Three with U.S. Bonds
1961	"School Is Out"	5	12	―	―	Dance 'Til Quarter to Three with U.S. Bonds
1961	"School Is In"	28	―	―	―	non-album single
1962	"Dear Lady Twist"	9	5	―	―	Twist Up Calypso
1962	"Twist, Twist Senora"	9	―	―	―	Twist Up Calypso
1962	"Seven Day Weekend"	27	―	―	―	non-album single
1962	"Copy Cat"	92	―	―	―	non-album single
1962	"Mixed Up Faculty"	―	―	―	―	non-album single
1962	"Where Did That Naughty Little Girl Go"	―	―	―	―	non-album single
1963	"I Don't Wanta Wait"	―	―	―	―	non-album single
1963	"No More Homework"	―	―	―	―	non-album single
1963	"Perdido (Parts I & II)"	―	―	―	―	non-album single
1963	"My Sweet Ruby Rose"	―	―	―	―	non-album single
1964	"Miss You America"	―	―	―	―	non-album single
1964	"Ella Is Yella"	―	―	―	―	non-album single
1964	"Oh Yeah - Oh Yeah"	―	―	―	―	non-album single
1965	"You Oughta See My Sarah"	―	―	―	―	non-album single
1965	"Do the Bumpsie"	―	―	―	―	non-album single
1966	"Take Me Back to New Orleans"	121	―	―	―	non-album single
1966	"Slow Motion"	―	―	―	―	non-album single
1967	"Send Her to Me"	―	―	―	―	non-album single
1967	"Call Me for Christmas"	―	―	―	―	non-album single
1968	"Sarah Jane"	―	―	―	―	non-album single
1968	"I'm Glad You're Back"	―	―	―	―	non-album single
1969	"The Star"	―	―	―	―	non-album single
1970	"One Broken Heart"	―	―	―	―	non-album single
1971	"Joy to the World"	―	―	―	―	non-album single
1974	"My Love Song"	―	―	―	―	non-album single
1975	"Grandma's Washboard Band"	―	―	―	―	non-album single
1981	"This Little Girl"	11	―	5	43	Dedication
1981	"Jolé Blon"	65	―	29	51	Dedication
1981	"It's Only Love"	―	―	―	43	Dedication
1982	"Soul Deep"	―	―	―	59	On the Line
1982	"Out of Work"	21	82	10	―	On the Line
1984	"Standing in the Line of Fire"	―	―	―	―	Standing in the Line of Fire
1985	"Summertime Fun" / "Dance to the Beat"	―	―	―	―	non-album single
"—" denotes releases that did not chart.
