= Gene Barge =

American musician and composer (1926–2025)

- Also known as: Daddy G.
- Born: James Gene Barge Jr. August 9, 1926; Norfolk, Virginia, U.S.
- Died: February 2, 2025 (aged 98) Chicago, Illinois, U.S.
- Genres: Rhythm and blues, rock and roll
- Occupations: Musician; composer; producer
- Instruments: Tenor saxophone, alto saxophone
- Labels: Legrand Records; Cadet records; Chess Records; Checker Records
- Formerly of: The Church Street Five, Big Twist and the Mellow Fellows

James Gene Barge Jr. (August 9, 1926 – February 2, 2025) was an American tenor and alto saxophonist in several bands in addition to being a composer. Known as "Daddy G", he collaborated with Gary "U.S." Bonds on the 1961 hit "Quarter to Three" and worked as a musician, producer and arranger for Chess Records in the 1960s. He co-produced Natalie Cole's Grammy Award-winning single "Sophisticated Lady" and toured with the Rolling Stones in the early 1980s. He also worked as a character actor, with roles in films including Above the Law, The Package and The Fugitive.

== Career ==
Born in Norfolk, Virginia, on August 9, 1926, he was a founding member of the 1960s band The Church Street Five, which recorded for the locally based label, Legrand Records. Frank Guida owned Legrand Records. The band included Gene Barge (sax), Ron "Junior" Farley (bass), Willie Burnell (piano), Leonard Barks (trombone), and Emmet Shields (drums).

Barge played the saxophone on Chuck Willis’ “C.C. Rider”, recorded on January 31, 1957 and released in March 1957.

In 1961, The Dovells were number 2 on the Billboard Hot 100 with a song called "Bristol Stomp", which refers to Bristol, Pennsylvania east of Philadelphia. The song contains the line "We ponied and twisted and we rocked with Daddy G". Since Gene Barge had earlier co-written "A Night With Daddy 'G' - Part 1" and "A Night With Daddy 'G' - Part 2" (Legrand LEG 1004), many applied the pseudonym 'Daddy G' to him. It is not known whether the 'Daddy G' of that 1961 song lyric was intended to be Gene Barge or Bishop 'Daddy' Grace, a Norfolk evangelist whose church address was the inspiration for the naming of the group.

The lyrics to Gary U.S. Bonds' 1961 hit on Legrand, "Quarter To Three", which were added to the original Church Street Five instrumental, mention the Church Street Five and Daddy G. It has the lyrics "With the help last night, of Daddy G" and the exhortation "Blow, Daddy!" Barge moved from Virginia to Chicago in the early 1960s to widen his music and acting careers. He worked with Chess Records during the 1960s, playing on recording sessions and providing arrangements along with production work. In the 1970s, he continued to produce as well as arrange records, including work on Natalie Cole's early hits. He toured and played with such notables as Fats Domino, Bo Diddley, Big Joe Turner, LaVern Baker, Ray Charles, Chuck Willis, the Rolling Stones, Gary U.S. Bonds, and Natalie Cole; and he had roles in major movies starring Gene Hackman, Chuck Norris, Harrison Ford, and Steven Seagal. Barge toured under the pseudonym 'Daddy G.' He also acted in a handful of films, including Under Siege and The Fugitive.

In 1982, Barge was invited to go on tour in Europe with The Rolling Stones. After that tour, he joined the band, Big Twist and the Mellow Fellows. The lead singer, Larry "Big Twist" Nolan died in 1990. The band continued for a period of time with Barge doing some of the vocals. In 1993, the Mellow Fellows co-founder Pete Special left. This prompted Barge and two other members to launch the group, Chicago Rhythm & Blues Kings. Because he knew all of the songs, he was pushed into the front man position. As of 2021, he was still fronting the band.

Barge died at his home in the Bronzeville neighborhood on the South Side of Chicago, on February 2, 2025. He was 98.

== Discography ==
- Dance With Daddy "G" (Checker 2994) 1965

With Bo Diddley

- The London Bo Diddley Sessions (Chess, 1973)

With Jack McDuff

- Gin and Orange (Cadet, 1969)

With Malachi Thompson

- Blue Jazz (Delmark, 2003) with Gary Bartz and Billy Harper

With Muddy Waters

- Muddy, Brass & the Blues (Chess, 1966)

== Sources ==
- The History Makers
