= List of pre-fame band departures =

While many notable bands go through several lineup changes throughout their careers, this list of artists who left right before their bands became famous only lists members who quit or were fired from a band shortly before the band achieved mainstream commercial success.

Artists who were only meant to be temporary stand-ins in their bands should not be included in this list. The bands the listed artists left must be notable, can be from any genre of music, and include vocal groups whose members do not play instruments. Because these artists left before their former bands' mainstream breakthrough, they should not be considered part of their former bands' "classic" lineups.

== Notable examples ==
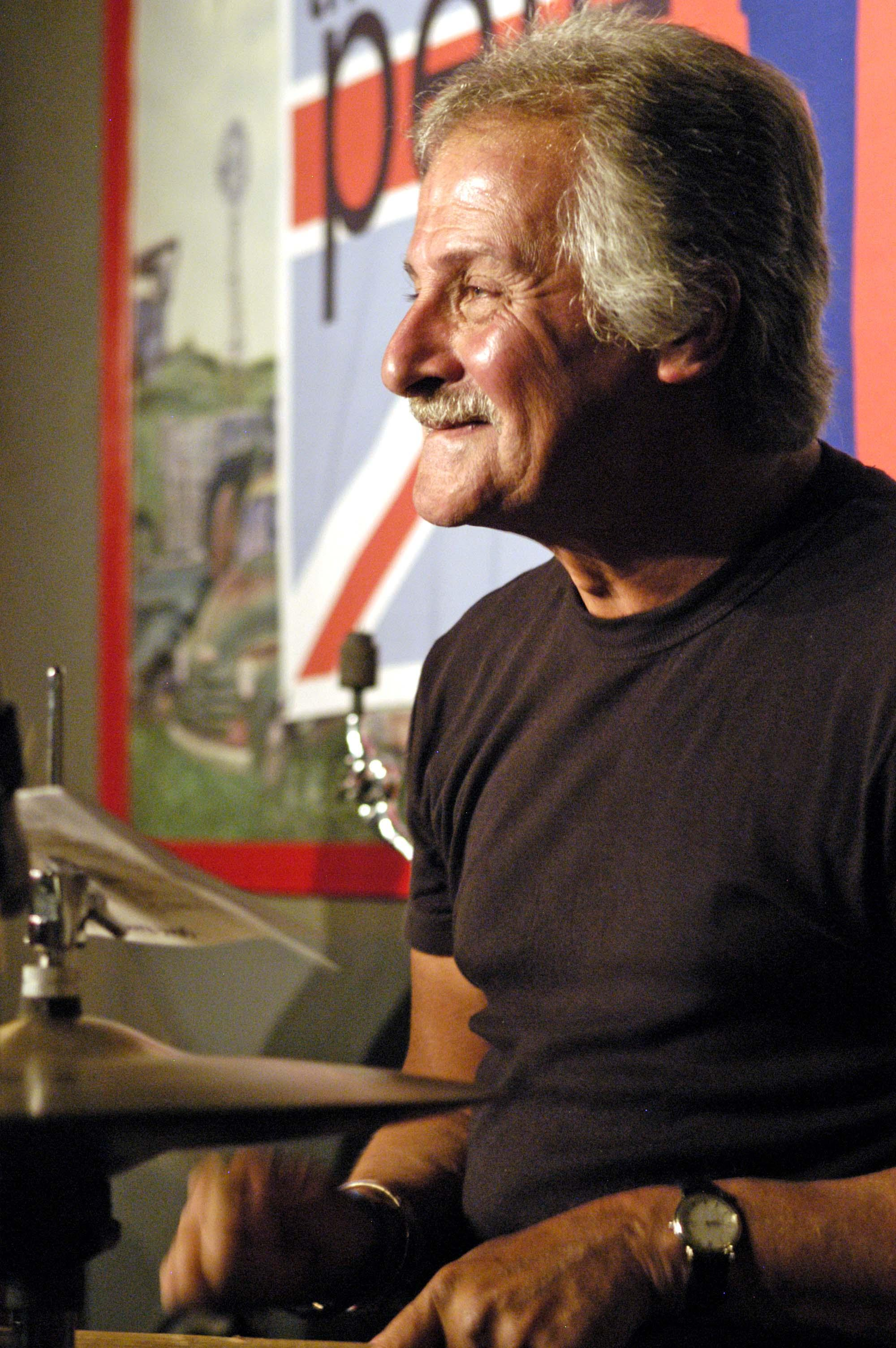
Ex-Beatles drummer Pete Best in 2006. Best was fired from the Beatles a year before "Beatlemania" started.

Of these "nearly-men", drummer Pete Best, who was fired from the Beatles in 1962, just a year before "Beatlemania" started, has been cited as the best-known archetype. Best has since become "famous for not being famous".

Jason Everman left two bands that went on to become famous: he was fired from Nirvana in 1989 and Soundgarden in 1990. According to The New York Times, Everman "wasn't just Pete Best ... He was Pete Best twice."

Some of these artists eventually went on to find mainstream success in another band or as a soloist. For example, Metallica's original lead guitarist, Dave Mustaine, formed his own thrash metal band Megadeth in 1983 after he was fired from his former band. While Metallica went on to achieve massive commercial success, Mustaine's Megadeth also enjoyed commercial success, selling 50 million records worldwide.

== Alphabetic list ==
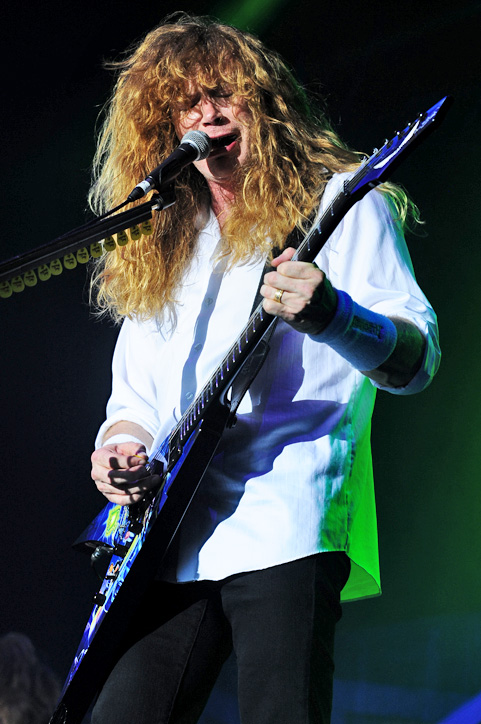
Dave Mustaine in 2010. Mustaine formed the successful Megadeth after being fired from Metallica.

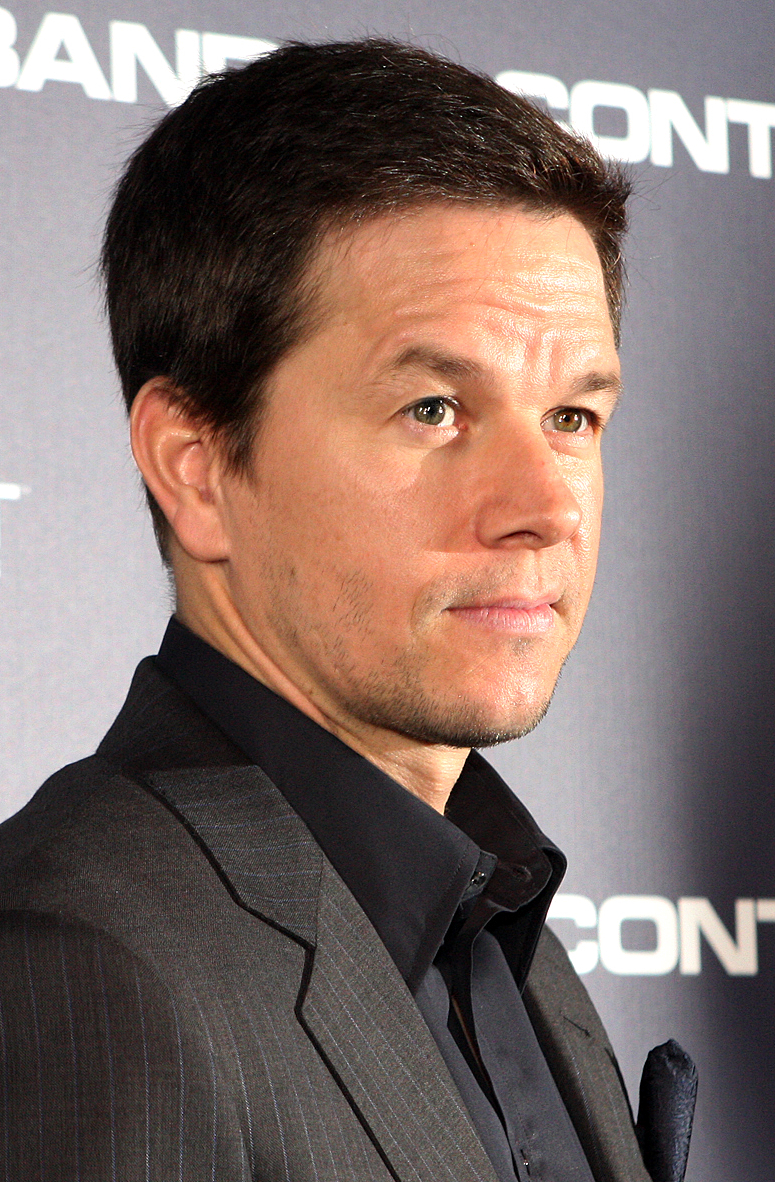
Mark Wahlberg in 2012. Wahlberg became a famous actor, singer and model after he quit New Kids on the Block.

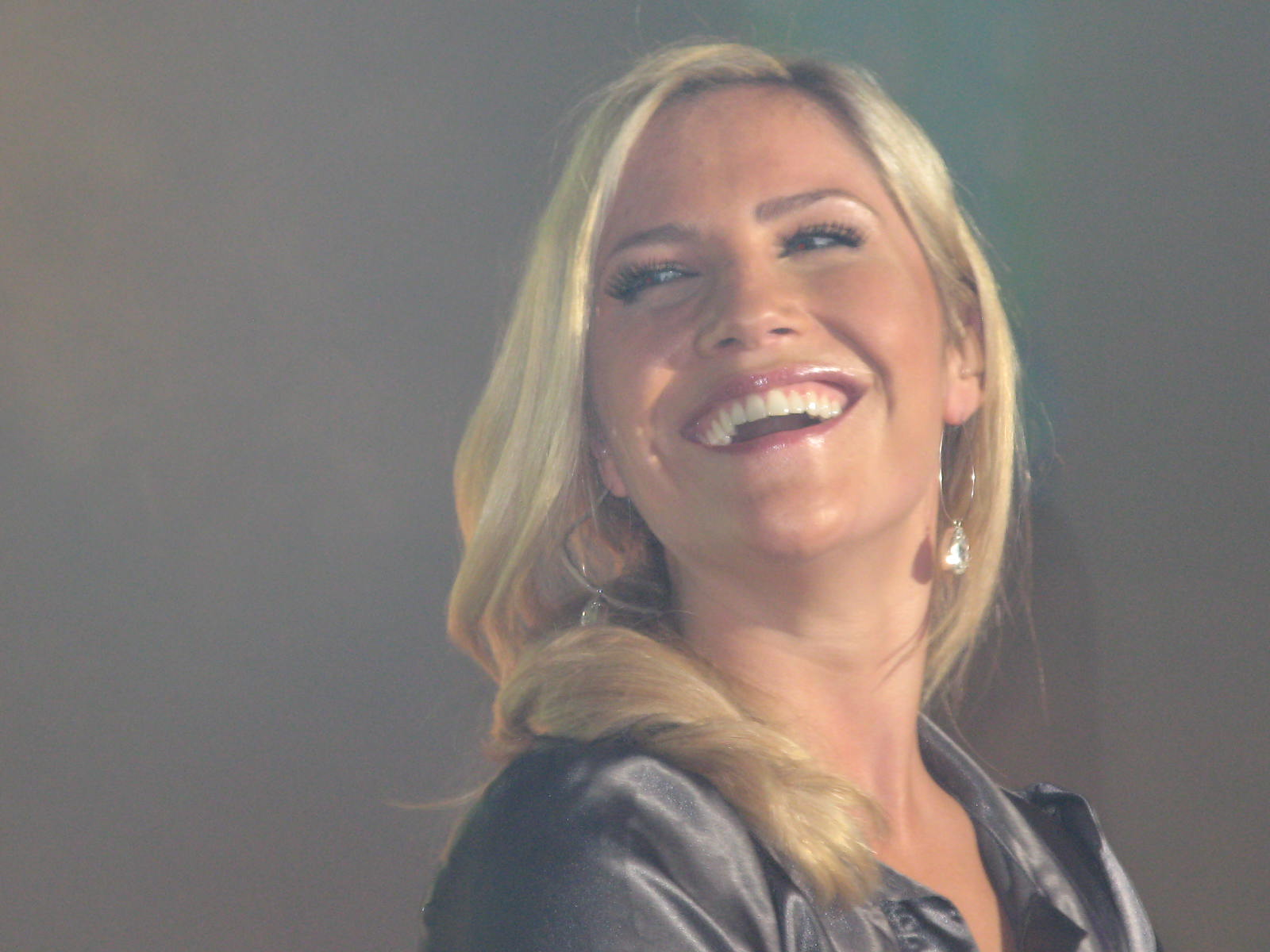
Heidi Range in 2006. Range quit Atomic Kitten shortly before the release of their debut single and later joined another girl group, the Sugababes.

Artists are listed alphabetically by their surname, followed by the band they left, their former role in the band, the year they left, and the year their former band achieved mainstream success. Additional comments on the way the artist left (fired or quit) and their replacement, if any, may be added at the end. All entries are referenced with reliable sources.

Artist	Band the artist left	Role	Year the artist left	Year of band's commercial breakthrough	Notes	Ref
George Baldi	Boyz II Men	Vocalist	1988	1991	Quit	
Syd Barrett	Pink Floyd	Guitarist, vocalist	1968	1973	Fired and replaced by David Gilmour	
Tina Barrett	Mis-Teeq (then known as Face2Face)	Vocalist	1998	2001	Left to join S Club 7 who also gained success, scoring 11 top 10 singles.	
Ole Beich	Guns N' Roses	Bassist	1985	1988	Either quit or was fired. Replaced by Duff McKagan.	
Pete Best	The Beatles	Drummer	1962	1963	Fired and replaced by Ringo Starr	
Josh Brainard	Slipknot	Guitarist	1998	1999	Replaced by Jim Root. Recorded for some tracks of Slipknot but left the band before the album's release.	
Elbridge Bryant	The Temptations	Vocalist	1963	1964	Fired and replaced by David Ruffin	
Tanya Candler	Kittie	Bassist	1999	2000	Played on debut album Spit and appeared on the cover of its original release, but quit Kittie two months before its release. She was replaced by Talena Atfield, who appears on the cover of all reissues of the album since 2000.	
Maddy Chan	Steps	Vocalist	1997	1997	Quit and replaced by Claire Richards and Faye Tozer	
Chad Channing	Nirvana	Drummer	1990	1991	Fired and replaced by Dave Grohl	
Tony Chapman	The Rolling Stones	Drummer	1962	1963	Quit and replaced by Charlie Watts	
Simon Colley	Duran Duran	Bassist	1979	1981	Quit and replaced by John Taylor, who was already a member of the band, switching from guitar to bass guitar.	
Anders Colsefni	Slipknot	Vocalist, percussionist	1997	1999	Replaced as vocalist by Corey Taylor and switched to percussion, then left the band and was replaced by Greg Welts.	
Jason Cropper	Weezer	Guitarist	1993	1994	Fired and replaced by Brian Bell	
Alan Curtis	Duran Duran	Guitarist	1980	1981	Quit and replaced by Andy Taylor	
John Curulewski	Styx	Guitarist	1975	1975	Left and replaced by Tommy Shaw	
Támar Davis	Destiny's Child (then known as Girl's Tyme)	Vocalist	1993	1997	Fired and replaced by LeToya Luckett	
Bob Debank	Coast to Coast	Guitarist	1979	1980	Quit	
Stephen Duffy	Duran Duran	Vocalist/bassist/ drummer	1979	1981	Quit and replaced by Andy Wickett	
Jason Everman	Nirvana	Guitarist	1989	1991	Fired	
Jason Everman	Soundgarden	Bassist	1990	1992	Fired and replaced by Ben Shepherd	
Frank Farrell	Supertramp	Bassist	1970	1972	Left and replaced by Dougie Thompson	
Jason Galasso	NSYNC	Vocalist	1995	1997	Quit and replaced by Lance Bass	
Pete Garner	The Stone Roses	Bassist	1987	1989	Quit and replaced by Mani	
Michael Garrett	Westlife	Vocalist	1998	1999	Fired and replaced by Nicky Byrne and Brian McFadden	
Terry Glaze	Pantera	Vocalist	1986	1990	Quit and replaced by Phil Anselmo	
Peter Griesar	Dave Matthews Band	Keyboardist	1993	1994	Quit	
Mike Grose	Queen	Bassist	1970	1974	Quit, replaced by Barry Mitchell, then Doug Bogie, then John Deacon	
Tracii Guns	Guns N' Roses	Guitarist	1985	1988	Quit and replaced by Slash	
Dale Hibbert	The Smiths	Bassist	1982	1983	Fired and replaced by Andy Rourke	
Kim Hill	Black Eyed Peas	Vocalist	2000	2003	Quit and later replaced by Fergie	
Doug Hopkins	Gin Blossoms	Guitarist	1992	1993	Fired and replaced by Scott Johnson	
Crystal Jones	TLC	Vocalist	1991	1992	Fired and replaced by Rozonda Thomas	
Jeff Jones	Rush	Vocalist, bassist	1968	1974	Left and replaced by Geddy Lee	
Graham Keighron	Westlife	Vocalist	1998	1999	Fired and replaced by Nicky Byrne and Brian McFadden	
John Kiffmeyer	Green Day	Drummer	1990	1994	Replaced while at college by Tré Cool	
Stella Kim	Girls' Generation	Vocalist	2007	2007	Quit	
Abigail Kis	Spice Girls (then known as Touch)	Vocalist	1994	1996	Quit and replaced by Emma Bunton	
Bob Klose	Pink Floyd	Guitarist	1965	1967	Quit	
Derrick Lacey	Westlife	Vocalist	1998	1999	Fired and replaced by Nicky Byrne and Brian McFadden	
James Lilja	The Offspring	Drummer	1987	1994	Quit and replaced by Ron Welty	
Jonathan Lippmann	98 Degrees	Vocalist	1996	1998	Quit and replaced by Drew Lachey	
Bob Livingson	Santana	Drummer	1968	1969	Quit and replaced by Michael Shrieve	
Robin Lynn Macy	Dixie Chicks	Guitarist	1992	1995	Quit	
Barbara Martin	The Supremes	Vocalist	1962	1964	Quit	
Jim Masdea	Boston (band)	Drummer	1975	1976	Quit and replaced by Sib Hashian	
Ron McGovney	Metallica	Bassist	1982	1986	Quit and replaced by Cliff Burton	
Zena McNally	Mis-Teeq	Vocalist	2001	2001	Quit	
Alan Mills	Coast to Coast	Vocalist	1980	1980	Quit and replaced by Sandy Fontaine	
Lianne Morgan	Spice Girls (then known as Touch)	Vocalist	1994	1996	Quit and replaced by Melanie C	
Dave Mustaine	Metallica	Guitarist	1983	1986	Fired and replaced by Kirk Hammett	
Marc Nelson	Boyz II Men	Vocalist	1989	1991	Quit	
Derek O'Brien	Steps	Vocalist	1997	1997	Quit and replaced by Lee Latchford-Evans	
Henry Padovani	The Police	Guitarist	1977	1979	Fired and replaced by Andy Summers	
So-yeon Park	Girls' Generation	Vocalist	2007	2007	Quit	
Matt Pelissier	My Chemical Romance	Drummer	2004	2004	Fired and replaced by Bob Bryar	
Anthony Phillips	Genesis	Guitarist	1970	1972	Quit and replaced by Steve Hackett	
Justin Quinn	Another Level	Vocalist	1997	1998	Left and became a solo UK garage singer known as JJ, appearing on two top 10 hits by DJ Luck & MC Neat in 2000.	
Niall Quinn	The Cranberries	Vocalist	1990	1993	Quit and replaced by Dolores O'Riordan	
Simone Rainford	All Saints (then known as All Saints 1.9.7.5.)	Vocalist	1995	1997	Quit. Nicole and Natalie Appleton later joined the group in 1996.	
Heidi Range	Atomic Kitten	Vocalist	1999	1999	Quit and replaced by Natasha Hamilton. Range would later find success with Sugababes.	
Scott Raynor	Blink-182	Drummer	1998	1999	Fired and replaced by Travis Barker	
Richie Rock	Boyzone	Vocalist	1994	1994	Fired and replaced by Mikey Graham	
John Rutsey	Rush	Drummer	1974	1974	Left and replaced by Neil Peart	
Chris Salih	Twenty One Pilots	Drummer	2011	2015	Quit and replaced by Josh Dun	
Doug Sandom	The Who	Drummer	1964	1965	Fired and replaced by Keith Moon	
Kate Schellenbach	Beastie Boys	Drummer	1984	1986		
Jon Shoats	Boyz II Men	Vocalist	1988	1991	Quit	
Eric Stefani	No Doubt	Keyboardist	1994	1995	Quit	
Michelle Stephenson	Spice Girls	Vocalist	1994	1996	Quit and replaced by Abigail Kis, prior to Emma Bunton	
Mitch Stevens	Steps	Vocalist	1997	1997	Quit and replaced by Claire Richards and Faye Tozer	
Ian Stewart	The Rolling Stones	Keyboardist	1963	1963	Fired, but retained as studio and touring member	
Scott Sundquist	Soundgarden	Drummer	1985	1992	Quit to spend time with his family and replaced by Matt Cameron	
Stuart Sutcliffe	The Beatles	Bassist, vocalist	1961	1963	Quit to pursue a career as a painter	
Nikki Taylor	Destiny's Child (then known as Girl's Tyme)	Vocalist	1993	1997	Fired and replaced by LeToya Luckett	
Nina Taylor	Destiny's Child (then known as Girl's Tyme)	Vocalist	1993	1997	Fired and replaced by LeToya Luckett	
Jeff Thomas	Duran Duran	Vocalist	1980	1981	Quit and replaced by Simon Le Bon	
Nick Thomas	Twenty One Pilots	Bassist	2011	2015	Quit	
Mark Wahlberg	New Kids on the Block	Vocalist	1985	1988	Quit and replaced by Joey McIntyre	
Marguerite Walker	Boyz II Men	Vocalist	1988	1991	Quit	
Mark Walton	Boyzone	Vocalist	1994	1994	Quit	
Greg "Cuddles" Welts	Slipknot	Percussionist	1998	1999	Replaced by Chris Fehn	
Andy Wickett	Duran Duran	Vocalist	1980	1981	Quit and replaced by Jeff Thomas, prior to Simon Le Bon	
Hye-rim Woo	Miss A	Vocalist	2010	2010	Left and joined Wonder Girls instead	
Hiro Yamamoto	Soundgarden	Bassist	1989	1992	Quit and replaced by Jason Everman	
Annette Zilinskas	The Bangles	Bassist	1983	1986	Quit and replaced by Michael Steele; Zilinskas later rejoined the band in 2018.	
