= Twist with Chubby Checker =

Studio album by Chubby Checker
- Released: October 1960
- Genre: Rock and roll
- Length: 30:27
- Label: Parkway
- Producer: Kal Mann

Chubby Checker chronology
Twist with Chubby Checker (1960)	For Twisters Only (1960)

Singles from Twist with Chubby Checker
- 1. "The Twist/Toot" Released: June 1960; 2. "The Hucklebuck/Whole Lotta Shakin' Goin' On" Released: September 1960; 3. "The Twist/Twistin' U.S.A." Released: November 1961

Professional ratings
Review scores
Source	Rating
AllMusic	4/5 stars

Twist with Chubby Checker is the debut studio album by Chubby Checker and was released in 1960 by Parkway Records.

== Track listing ==
=== Side A ===
1. "Twistin' U.S.A." (Kal Mann)
2. "The "Ooh Poo Pah Doo" Shimmy" (Jessie Hill)
3. "The "C. C. Rider" Stroll" (Chuck Willis)
4. "The Strand" (Kal Mann)
5. "The Chicken" (Rosco Gordon)
6. "The Hucklebuck" (Andy Gibson, Roy Alfred)

=== Side B ===
1. "The Twist" (Hank Ballard)
2. "The Madison" (Al Brown)
3. ""Love Is Strange" Chalypso" (Ethel Smith)
4. "The "Mexican Hat" Twist" (Dave Appell, Kal Mann)
5. "The Slop" (Cliff Goldsmith, Fred Sledge Smith)
6. "The Pony" (Dave Appell, Kal Mann)

== Chart positions ==
Chart (1960)	Peak position
US Billboard Best-Selling Mono Action Albums	3
US UK Albums Chart	13

Singles

Year	Single	Chart	Peak position
1960	"The Twist"	U.S. Pop	1
1960	"The Twist"	U.S. R&B	2
1960	"The Twist"	UK Singles Chart	44
1960	"The Hucklebuck"	U.S. Pop	14
1960	"The Hucklebuck"	U.S. R&B	15
1962	"The Twist"	U.S. Pop	1
1962	"The Twist"	U.S. R&B	4
1962	"The Twist"	UK Singles Chart	14
1962	"Twistin' U.S.A"	U.S. Pop	68
