= Louder Than Love =

Studio album by Soundgarden
- Released: September 5, 1989
- Recorded: December 1988 – January 1989
- Studio: London Bridge (Seattle)
- Genres: Grunge; alternative metal
- Length: 53:15
- Label: A&M
- Producers: Terry Date; Soundgarden

Soundgarden chronology
Ultramega OK (1988)	Louder Than Love (1989)	Badmotorfinger (1991)

Singles from Louder Than Love
- 1. "Loud Love" Released: September 21, 1989; 2. "Hands All Over" Released: April 9, 1990

Louder Than Love is the second studio album and major-label debut by American rock band Soundgarden. It was released on September 5, 1989, by A&M Records. After touring in support of their debut album, Ultramega OK (1988), Soundgarden left SST, signed with A&M and began work on their first album for a major label. The songs on the album featured a metal-leaning grunge sound with some songs featuring unusual or unorthodox time signatures.

Due to the nature of some of the lyrics (particularly "Big Dumb Sex"), a Parental Advisory sticker was placed on the album packaging. Louder Than Love would become the band's first album to chart on the Billboard 200, peaking at No. 108, and it was also the first grunge record to enter that chart. The band supported the album with tours of North America and Europe. This was the last Soundgarden album to feature the band's original bassist, Hiro Yamamoto.

== Recording ==
The album's recording sessions took place from December 1988 to January 1989 at London Bridge Studios in Seattle, Washington. The band worked with producer Terry Date, who at the time was known for producing, engineering and mixing albums by local metal bands such as Metal Church, The Accüsed, Fifth Angel and Sanctuary. The album was mixed by Steve Thompson and Michael Barbiero at both Mediasound in New York City and House of Music in West Orange, New Jersey.

Regarding the sessions, frontman Chris Cornell said, "At the time Hiro [Yamamoto] had excommunicated himself from the band and there wasn't a free-flowing system as far as music went, so I ended up writing a lot of it." Cornell would end up solely writing seven out of the album's twelve tracks. Notably, when "Get on the Snake" was released on the soundtrack to the film Lost Angels, all four band members were credited as writers of the song. On Louder Than Love however, only Thayil and Cornell were credited as writers. Cornell stated that there "was plenty of angst, anger, frustration and hell ... but none of it had anything to do with Terry. He was very supportive". He said that the sessions as a whole were a "positive experience." Bassist Hiro Yamamoto left the band once the sessions were over and went back to college, frustrated that he was not contributing much.

Regarding the album's production, Cornell said that the band tried to avoid 1980s production techniques. On the album's sound as a whole, Cornell stated that the album "was just a few degrees too produced and too clean, although I wouldn't want to change any of it".

== Music and lyrics ==
Steve Huey of AllMusic said that Soundgarden took "a step toward the metal mainstream" with "a slow, grinding, detuned mountain of Sabbath/Zeppelin riffs and Chris Cornell wailing". At the time the band was trying to avoid the "heavy metal" label, with guitarist Kim Thayil stating that the band's sound was "as much influenced by British bands like Killing Joke and Bauhaus as it is by heavy metal". Cornell said that the band's sound is "enough for anyone into speed metal, but we're heavy rock ... Neo-metal maybe."

Some songs on the album feature unusual or unorthodox time signatures. "Get on the Snake", for example, is played in 9/4. "I Awake" uses 4/4, 6/4, 9/8, 11/8, and 14/8. "Gun" features varying tempos, which speed up and slow down over the course of the song. A lot of the songs on the album are tuned down to drop D tuning.

Cornell said that "Hands All Over" is about how humans defile the environment, and that "Full on Kevin's Mom" is about "a friend of mine who slept with another friend of mine's mom. The guy who did it said to us, 'Yeah, full on Kevin's mom'." The lyrics of "I Awake" were originally part of a note written by Yamamoto's then girlfriend Kate McDonald. In the late 1990s, an urban legend circulated on internet message boards which stated that Yamamoto, after writing the music, wrote some lyrics on the back side of McDonald's note. When Yamamoto gave the paper containing these lyrics to Cornell, Cornell looked at the wrong side of the sheet and believed McDonald's note was the lyrics to Yamamoto's song. There was less material on the album intended as humorous compared with Ultramega OK. However, the song "Big Dumb Sex" was written as a parody of glam metal bands, who often metaphorically addressed sexual intercourse in their lyrics. The song, with its many uses of "fuck", was the reason the album gained a Parental Advisory sticker upon release.

== Outtakes ==
The album's singles featured two B-sides from the Louder Than Love recording sessions that weren't included on the album, "Fresh Deadly Roses" and "Heretic". "Fresh Deadly Roses" was a B-side on the "Loud Love" single and was featured on the 1990 Pave the Earth compilation. "Heretic" was originally recorded for the 1986 Deep Six compilation. However, the song was re-recorded during the Louder Than Love recording sessions and this version is featured on the "Hands All Over" single, the Pump Up the Volume soundtrack, and the Loudest Love EP. A Cameron penned instrumental entitled "Twin Tower" was recorded during the sessions, but not released until it appeared on Echo of Miles: Scattered Tracks Across the Path.

== Packaging and title ==
The album's cover art, photographed by Charles Peterson, features a black and white picture of Cornell. Cornell called the album cover "the quintessential angry young man". Regarding the title, Cornell said, "It's sort of making fun of heavy metal bravado. Metal bands would say Louder Than Thunder or something. So Louder Than Love, what is Louder Than Love?" Kim Thayil said that the band really wanted to call the album Louder Than Fuck.

The album's graphic designer, Art Chantry said about the title on the 2009 book Grunge Is Dead: The Oral History of Seattle Rock Music:

They didn't have a name for the record. We were talking about it and joking – I said, "You should really call this record 'Louder Than Shit.' They go, "That's a great name!" I go, "No... call it 'Louder Than Fuck'" "Oh, that's great!" And [Soundgarden manager] Susan Silver goes, "My band isn't putting out a record with 'Fuck' in the title." That's where Louder Than Love came from.

== Release and reception ==
Professional ratings
Contemporary reviews
Review scores
Source	Rating
Daily News	3/4 stars
Kerrang!	4/5
Los Angeles Times	2.5/4 stars
Metal Hammer	5/5 stars
The Philadelphia Inquirer	3/4 stars
The Press	3/4 stars
St. Petersburg Times	4/5 stars
The Village Voice	C+

Professional ratings
Retrospective reviews
Review scores
Source	Rating
AllMusic	3/5 stars
The Encyclopedia of Popular Music	3/5 stars
Collector's Guide to Heavy Metal	8/10
The Great Rock Discography	8/10
MusicHound Rock	3.5/5 stars
Rolling Stone	3.5/5 stars
The Rolling Stone Album Guide	4/5 stars
Spin	3/5 stars
Spin Alternative Record Guide	6/10

Roughly four months before Louder Than Love's release, "Get on the Snake" was released as a promotional single. It appeared in the film and on the soundtrack to the movie Lost Angels. A US promo-only picture disc (without a picture sleeve or insert) of the album was also released on July 12, 1989.

Because of some of the song lyrics, most notably on "Hands All Over" (the "kill your mother" line) and "Big Dumb Sex", the band faced various retail and distribution problems upon the album's release. Louder Than Love peaked at number 108 on the Billboard 200 album chart in 1990. It was the band's first album to chart on the Billboard 200, and also the first grunge album to enter that chart, predating Alice in Chains' debut album Facelift by one year. Louder Than Love spawned the Loudest Love EP and the Louder Than Live home video, both released in 1990.

Backed by three singles, "Loud Love", "Hands All Over", and the aforementioned "Get on the Snake", Louder Than Love was Soundgarden's first breakthrough in rock and metal circles. The music videos for "Loud Love" and "Hands All Over" were in rotation on MTV's Headbangers Ball, while a music video for "Get on the Snake" was not released until 2010 in conjunction with the band's reunion. The album also received airplay on many mainstream rock radio stations outside of Seattle such as KNAC, WMMS, KRZQ, WBCN, Z Rock, and KISS-FM.

Rolling Stone staff writer J. D. Considine wrote that "Chris Cornell has the sort of soaring, muscular voice Ian Astbury can only dream of, while guitarist Kim Thayil comes across like The Edge with an attitude". He stated that "the songs on Louder Than Love are mean, lean and fighting fit", but he criticized Cornell's lyrics, observing that "much of what the band has to say is clichéd, confused or generally incomprehensible". He ended his review by saying that "even when his lyrics are as dumb as rocks ... Cornell delivers them with such full-throated intensity that they actually sound impressive." AllMusic staff writer Steve Huey stated that "too much of the album drifts along without focus or variety." Critic Robert Christgau gave the album a negative review, stating that it is "covertly conceptual, arty in spite of itself, and I bet metal fans don't bite". Canadian journalist Martin Popoff considered Louder Than Love "a limiting, slightly safe record despite daunting rhythmic explorations, one that plays too close to the vest, too tight and faithful to external perceptions of what the band should be and too damn slow!"

In 2001, Q named Louder Than Love as one of the "50 Heaviest Albums of All Time." In 2017, Rolling Stone ranked Louder Than Love as 69th on its list of "The 100 Greatest Metal Albums of All Time".

== Tour ==
A month before touring for Louder Than Love commenced, Yamamoto left to go back to college. Cornell stated, "It seems an odd time to quit. We're doing real well. We've got a touring budget now. We don't haul amps or do such long van rides any more." He was replaced by Jason Everman, formerly of Nirvana. The band embarked on a North American tour that went from December 1989 to March 1990. On this tour the band served as the opening act for Voivod on the band's Nothingface tour, with Faith No More and The Big F also serving as opening acts at the beginning and end of the tour. Cornell's roommate, Andrew Wood, the lead singer of Mother Love Bone, died on March 19, 1990, of a heroin overdose, the day Cornell got back from touring in support of Louder Than Love.

As Cornell went on to tour Europe with Soundgarden a few days later, he started writing songs in tribute to his late friend. The result was two songs, "Reach Down" and "Say Hello 2 Heaven", that he recorded as soon as he got back from touring. The two songs would eventually lead into the Temple of the Dog project. Bassist Jason Everman was fired immediately after Soundgarden completed its promotional tour for Louder Than Love in mid-1990. Thayil said that "Jason just didn't work out", and that the band "didn't need to go find someone better than him; we needed to find a kindred spirit that we'd hang out with anyway". The band later released the video compilation Louder Than Live, which was filmed at the Whisky a Go Go in 1989.

== Legacy ==
"Loud Love" was featured in the 1992 film Wayne's World.

Pantera recruited Terry Date to produce their 1990 album Cowboys from Hell on the strength of his work on Louder Than Love. Date assumed his role as a producer on Pantera's subsequent albums, until 1996's The Great Southern Trendkill.

Metallica guitarist Kirk Hammett revealed that he was inspired to write the riff to "Enter Sandman" after listening to Louder Than Love.

Guns N' Roses covered "Big Dumb Sex" on its 1993 album, "The Spaghetti Incident?", as part of a medley with T. Rex's "Buick Mackane".

The cover artwork of the 2020 single "Deep Set" by Greg Puciato is an homage to Louder Than Love.

== Track listing ==
All tracks are written by Chris Cornell, except where noted.

No.	Title	Lyrics	Music	Length
1.	"Ugly Truth"			5:26
2.	"Hands All Over"		Kim Thayil	6:00
3.	"Gun"			4:42
4.	"Power Trip"		Hiro Yamamoto	4:11
5.	"Get on the Snake"		Thayil	3:44
6.	"Full on Kevin's Mom"			3:37
7.	"Loud Love"			4:57
8.	"I Awake"	Kate McDonald	Yamamoto	4:21
9.	"No Wrong No Right"		Yamamoto	4:48
10.	"Uncovered"			4:32
11.	"Big Dumb Sex"			4:11
12.	"Full On" (Reprise)			2:42
Total length:				53:15

Note

- Some rare special editions of the album include a bonus disc of the Loudest Love EP. Cornell said in a Rolling Stone interview that the album would be fully complete if the last four tracks of the Loudest Love EP were added. Cornell said that he wanted to reissue the album remastered with these four tracks added, for a total of 16 tracks.

== Personnel ==
Soundgarden

- Chris Cornell – vocals, rhythm guitar
- Kim Thayil – lead guitar
- Hiro Yamamoto – bass
- Matt Cameron – drums

Production

- Terry Date – production with Soundgarden, engineering
- Nelson Ayres, Jack Endino, Stuart Hallerman – studio assistance
- Michael Barbiero, Steve Thompson – mixing
- Howie Weinberg – mastering
- Art Chantry – design & art execution
- Charles Peterson – photography (front cover)
- Michael Lavine – photography (back cover)
- Bruce Pavitt – Third Eye/front cover

== Charts ==
=== Album ===
Chart (1990)	Peak position
US Billboard 200	108

=== Singles ===
Year	Single	UK peak chart position
1990	"Hands All Over"	82
1990	"Loud Love"	87
