= Hands All Over =

Hands All Over may refer to:

- Hands All Over (album), by Maroon 5
  - "Hands All Over", the title track from the album
- "Hands All Over" (Soundgarden song)
