= Loud Love =

Single by Soundgarden

from the album Louder Than Love
- B-side: "Big Dumb Sex"
- Released: September 21, 1989
- Studio: London Bridge (Seattle)
- Length: 4:57
- Label: A&M
- Songwriter: Chris Cornell
- Producers: Terry Date; Soundgarden

Soundgarden singles chronology
"Flower" (1989)	"Loud Love" (1989)	"Hands All Over" (1990)

Music video
- "Loud Love" on YouTube

"Loud Love" is a song by the American rock band Soundgarden. It was released as the first single from the band's second studio album, Louder Than Love (1989). It is the quasi-title track from that album, and was also the basis for the EP Loudest Love and the live video Louder Than Live. The song was included on Soundgarden's 1997 greatest hits album, A-Sides.

== Origin and recording ==
"Loud Love" was written by frontman Chris Cornell. Guitarist Kim Thayil on the song:

The intro was a feedback melody. Many people think we used an E-bow. I've seen transcriptions that have said to use an E-bow. The truth is, I've never even seen an E-bow. I simply stood in front of the amp, got the note ringing until it was feeding back, and slid my finger up the fret on the string and dragged the feedback with it.

== Release ==
"Loud Love" was released as a single in 1989 with a previously unreleased B-side titled "Fresh Deadly Roses".

== Music video ==
The music video for "Loud Love" was directed by Kevin Kerslake, who would later direct the music video for "Hands All Over". The video features the band performing the song amid scenes of car crashes. It also features bassist Jason Everman (who appears on the cover of the single) although he does not play on the record. The video was released in October 1989. The video is available on the home video release Louder Than Live.

== Track listing ==
All songs written by Chris Cornell, except where noted:

CD single (Japan)

1. "Loud Love" – 4:57
2. "Big Dumb Sex" - 4:12

7" and 12" vinyl (UK)

1. "Loud Love" – 4:57
2. "Big Dumb Sex" (dub version) – 6:06
3. "Get on the Snake" (Cornell, Kim Thayil) – 3:44
4. "Fresh Deadly Roses" – 4:53

== Personnel ==
- Chris Cornell – vocals, rhythm guitar
- Kim Thayil – lead guitar
- Hiro Yamamoto – bass
- Matt Cameron – drums

== Charts ==
Chart (1990)	Position
UK Singles (OCC)	87

== Release history ==
Country	Label	Format	Catalog number	Release date	Ref.
Japan	A&M	Mini-CD	PCDY-10001	September 21, 1989	
United Kingdom	A&M	7" vinyl	AM 574	July 1990	
United Kingdom	A&M	12" vinyl	AMY 574	July 1990	
