= For Twisters Only =

Studio album by Chubby Checker
- Released: December 1960
- Genre: Rock and roll
- Label: Parkway
- Producer: Kal Mann

Chubby Checker chronology
Twist with Chubby Checker (1960)	For Twisters Only (1960)	Let's Twist Again (1961)

Singles from For Twisters Only
- 1. "The Hucklebuck/Whole Lotta Shakin' Goin' On" Released: September 1960

Professional ratings
Review scores
Source	Rating
AllMusic	3/5 stars

For Twisters Only is the second studio album by Chubby Checker and was released in 1960 by Parkway Records.

== Track listing ==
=== Side A ===
1. "Blueberry Hill" (Al Lewis, Larry Stock, Vincent Rose)
2. "Your Feet's Too Big" (Ada Benson, Fred Fisher)
3. "Hound Dog" (Jerry Leiber, Mike Stoller)
4. "Twist Train" (Jimmy Forrest, Lewis Simpkins, Oscar Washington)
5. "Mister Twister" (Kal Mann)
6. "Whole Lotta Shakin' Goin' On" (Dave "Curlee" Williams)

=== Side B ===
1. "Hold Tight" (Jerry Brandow, Willie Spottswood)
2. "Shake Rattle and Roll" (Charles Calhoun)
3. "But Girls!" (Dave Appell, Kal Mann)
4. "At the Hop" (Artie Singer, David White, John Medora)
5. "Dance with Me, Henry" (Etta James, Johnny Otis)
6. "Rock Around the Clock" (Jimmy DeKnight, Max C. Freedman)

== Chart positions ==
Chart (1960)	Peak position
US Billboard Top LPs	8
US UK Albums Chart	17

Singles

Year	Single	Chart	Peak position
1960	"Whole Lotta Shakin' Goin' On"	U.S. Pop	42
