= Geoff Burke =

Geoff Burke may refer to:

- A fictional character appearing in the 14th season of Australian television soap opera Neighbours
- A musician who has played with American jazz band The Hot Sardines
