= Your Feet's Too Big =

Song
- Published: 1936
- Genre: Jazz
- Composer: Fred Fisher
- Lyricist: Ada Benson

"Your Feet's Too Big" is a song composed in 1936 by Fred Fisher with lyrics by Ada Benson. It has been recorded by many artists, notably Fats Waller (1939) and the Ink Spots. The song became associated with Waller, who ad-libbed his own lyrics such as "Your pedal extremities are colossal, to me you look just like a fossil" and his catchphrase, "You know, your pedal extremities really are obnoxious. One never knows, do one?" It was performed in the 1978 revue of Waller tunes Ain't Misbehavin'. The animator Nancy Beiman created a short for Your Feet's Too Big in 1983.

The TV comedy series Harry and the Hendersons used Leon Redbone's version of the song as its theme tune. The film Be Kind Rewind used Fats Waller’s version, although Mos Def also recorded his own rendition of Waller's version for the film.

== Notable recordings ==
- Kenny Ball
- The Beatles (officially unreleased)
- Kevin Bowyer
- Chubby Checker (For Twisters Only)
- J. Lawrence Cook (piano roll)
- Freddy Gardner
- Steve Gillette
- The Hot Sardines
- The Ink Spots
- Alastair McDonald
- George Melly
- Earl Okin
- Ken Page
- Leon Redbone
- Ruben Studdard
- Aki Takase
- Fats Waller
- Michael-Leon Wooley
- The Captain Matchbox Whoopee Band
- Mos Def
