= Whole Lotta Shakin' Goin' On =

Music single

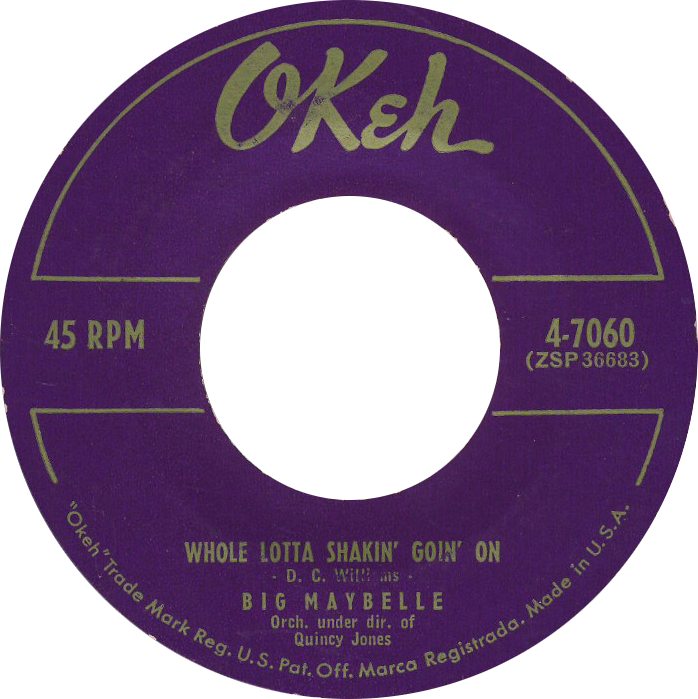

Single by Big Maybelle
- B-side: "One Monkey Don't Stop No Show"
- Released: 1955
- Genre: Rhythm and blues
- Length: 3:00
- Label: Okeh
- Songwriter: Dave "Curlee" Williams

Big Maybelle singles chronology
"Don't Leave Poor Me" (1955)	"Whole Lotta Shakin' Goin' On" (1955)	"Such a Cutie" (1956)

"Whole Lotta Shakin' Goin' On" (sometimes rendered "Whole Lot of Shakin' Going On") is a song written by Dave "Curlee" Williams and sometimes also credited to James Faye "Roy" Hall. The song was first recorded by Big Maybelle, though the best-known version is the 1957 rock and roll/rockabilly version by Jerry Lee Lewis.

== Origins of the song ==
The origins of the song are disputed, but the writing is usually co-credited to singer/songwriter Dave "Curlee" Williams, and pianist and club owner James Faye "Roy" Hall. Hall stated:

We was down in Pahokee, on Lake Okeechobee ... out on a damn pond, fishin' and milkin' snakes ... This guy down there had a big bell that he's ring to get us all to come in to dinner, an' I'd call over [and] say, 'What's goin' on?' Colored guy said, 'We got twen'y-one drums, we got an old bass horn, an' they even keepin' time on a ding-dong.' See, that was the big bell they'd ring to git us t'come in.

On 21 March 1955, Big Maybelle made the first recording for Okeh Records. The songwriting was credited to D. C. Williams, and the session was conducted and arranged by Quincy Jones. Roy Hall recorded the song in September 1955 for Decca Records and maintained that he had written it and had secured the legal copyright as co-writer under the pseudonym of "Sunny David". On the Pop Chronicles documentary, Jerry Lee Lewis incorrectly credited Big Mama Thornton.

== Jerry Lee Lewis version ==
"Whole Lot of Shakin' Going On"

Single by Jerry Lee Lewis
- B-side: "It'll Be Me"
- Released: 15 April 1957
- Studio: Sun Studio, Memphis, Tennessee
- Genre: Rock and roll; rockabilly
- Length: 2:52
- Label: Sun
- Songwriters: Dave "Curlee" Williams; James Faye "Roy" Hall
- Producer: Jack Clement

Jerry Lee Lewis singles chronology
"Crazy Arms" (1956)	"Whole Lot of Shakin' Going On" (1957)	"Great Balls of Fire" (1957)

Lewis had been performing the song in his stage act and recorded it at his second recording session for Sun Records in February 1957. Supervised by producer Jack Clement, Lewis radically altered the original, adding a propulsive boogie piano that was complemented by J.M. Van Eaton's energetic drumming and Roland Janes' "muted" guitar and also added suggestive spoken asides. The song was engineered by Jack "Cowboy" Clement, who told Lewis when he entered the studio, "We don't do much country around here. We're in the rock & roll business. You ought to go home and work up some rock & roll numbers." Lewis later stated: "I knew it was a hit when I cut it. Sam Phillips thought it was gonna be too risqué, it couldn't make it. If that's risqué, well, I'm sorry."

Sun released the song on a single, which reached No. 3 on the Billboard Hot 100 and No. 1 on the magazine's R&B record charts. A record review appeared in Billboard on 27 May 1957. The single also hit No. 1 on the country charts, and No. 8 in the UK Singles Chart. Lewis became an instant sensation and as music writer Robert Gordon noted: "Jerry Lee began to show that in this new emerging genre called rock 'n' roll, not everybody was going to stand there with a guitar."

In 1999, the 1957 recording on Sun Records was inducted into the Grammy Hall of Fame.

American music critic Cub Koda described the song as a "rock & roll classic", while scholar Charles L. Ponce de Leon said it was "perhaps the quintessential rockabilly anthem". Lewis's version of the song was ranked as the 61st greatest song of all time by Rolling Stone magazine in 2004. In 2005, it was selected for permanent preservation in the National Recording Registry at the Library of Congress. In June 2026, CBS News included the song in its list of the 250 essential American songs of the past 250 years.

== Levi Kreis version ==
Levi Kreis, portraying Lewis, sang the song in the Broadway musical Million Dollar Quartet, which opened in New York in April 2010. Kreis's version is included on the Million Dollar Quartet original Broadway cast recording.

== Chubby Checker version ==
Chubby Checker released a version on his second studio album For Twisters Only (1960). His version was released as the B-side to his single "The Hucklebuck" and reached No. 42 on the Billboard Hot 100. The song was co-charted with the A-side at #2 in Canada.
