= Loudest Love =

EP by Soundgarden
- Released: September 21, 1990
- Recorded: December 1988 to April 1990 in Seattle, Washington
- Genre: Grunge
- Length: 35:24
- Language: English
- Label: A&M
- Producer: Terry Date, Jack Endino, Soundgarden

Soundgarden EPs chronology
Fopp (1988)	Loudest Love (1990)	Songs from the Superunknown (1995)

Professional ratings
Review scores
Source	Rating
AllMusic	3/5 stars

Loudest Love is an EP by the American rock band Soundgarden. It was released in Japan in September 1990 through A&M Records.

== Overview ==
The track listing is based on the "Loud Love" U.K. vinyl single, with the addition of "Hands All Over", "Heretic" and "Come Together". AllMusic staff writer Greg Prato said, "The Loudest Love compilation is quite a find for hardcore fans of Soundgarden, but if you're a newcomer, start off with their 1997 best-of collection, A-Sides, or one of their official albums."

Despite bassist Jason Everman only performing on one track of the EP, that being the only song he ever recorded with the band, he is featured on the EP's cover. Bass for the other tracks was performed by Hiro Yamamoto, who had left Soundgarden and been replaced by Everman by the time of Loudest Love's release.

== Track listing ==
All lyrics are written by Chris Cornell, except where noted.

No.	Title	Lyrics	Music	Length
1.	"Loud Love"		Chris Cornell	4:57
2.	"Hands All Over"		Kim Thayil	6:00
3.	"Get on the Snake"		Thayil	3:44
4.	"Heretic"	Hiro Yamamoto	Thayil	3:48
5.	"Come Together"	Lennon-McCartney	Lennon-McCartney	5:52
6.	"Fresh Deadly Roses"		Cornell	4:53
7.	"Big Dumb Sex" (New Dub Mix)		Cornell	6:10
Total length:				35:24

- Tracks 1–3 are taken directly from the album Louder Than Love and are identical to their album counterparts. Track 7 is a remix of the album version of the song by Steve Fisk, previously available on the "Loud Love" single. Tracks 4 and 6 are b-sides from the "Hands All Over" and "Loud Love" singles, respectively. Track 5, also previously available on the "Hands All Over" single, is a cover of the classic Beatles tune, and is the only Soundgarden song to feature bassist, and former Nirvana guitarist, Jason Everman.

== Personnel ==
Soundgarden

- Matt Cameron – drums
- Chris Cornell – lead vocals, rhythm guitar
- Jason Everman – bass (track 5)
- Kim Thayil – lead guitar
- Hiro Yamamoto – bass

Production

- Terry Date – production, engineering, and mixing
- Jack Endino – production, engineering & mixing
- Steve Thompson – mixing
- Michael Barbiero – mixing
- Steve Fisk – mixing

Management

- Susan Silver Management – management
