= Louder Than Live =

Video by Soundgarden
- Released: May 22, 1990
- Recorded: December 7 and 10, 1989
- Venue: Whisky a Go Go, Los Angeles, California
- Genre: Grunge, heavy metal, alternative metal
- Length: 40 minutes (VHS); 38:12 (promo CD); 33:29 (promo LP)
- Language: English
- Label: A&M
- Director: Kevin Kerslake

Soundgarden chronology
| Louder Than Live (1990) | Motorvision (1992) |

Professional ratings
Review scores
| Source | Rating |
|---|---|
| AllMusic | 2.5/5 stars |

Louder Than Live is a home video by the American rock band Soundgarden, featuring songs performed live at the Whisky a Go Go in Los Angeles, California on December 7 and 10, 1989. It was directed by Kevin Kerslake, and released on May 22, 1990.

== Overview ==
Louder Than Live features five live tracks filmed during the Louder Than Love tour, namely, "Get on the Snake", "Gun", "I Awake", "Big Dumb Sex", and a medley of Spinal Tap's "Big Bottom" and Cheech & Chong's "Earache My Eye", with footage from both concerts mixed together. The home video also includes the previously released music videos for the songs "Loud Love" and "Hands All Over", both also directed by Kerslake. Chris Cornell is seen wearing silver duct tape shorts. The bassist for these performances was Jason Everman. AllMusic writer Greg Prato gave it two and a half out of a possible five stars; he stated, "for fans of early Soundgarden, Louder Than Live is still recommended." Louder Than Live was released on VHS only, with no official DVD version available.

In addition to the home video, A&M Records released a promotional mini-album, featuring the same title, in CD format (May 1990) and on 12" blue translucent vinyl (July 1990). The CD came in a thick cardboard packaging wrapped in silvery gray duct tape, and labeled with a yellow sticker that reads "Soundgarden: Louder Than Live! at the Whisky" with uppercase black letters. In addition to the five live tracks from the video, the CD includes the songs "Beyond the Wheel" and "Hunted Down", while the vinyl disc includes all the live tracks from the video in addition to "Beyond the Wheel". This album has been bootlegged on black vinyl; genuine copies can be distinguished by the A&M logo.

== Track listing ==
Live at the Whisky a Go Go
| No. | Title | Length |
|---|---|---|
| 1. | "Get on the Snake" |
| 2. | "Gun" |
| 3. | "I Awake" |
| 4. | "Big Dumb Sex" |
| 5. | "Big Bottom/Earache My Eye" |

Music Videos
| No. | Title | Length |
|---|---|---|
| 1. | "Loud Love" |
| 2. | "Hands All Over" |

=== Promotional CD ===
| No. | Title | Length |
|---|---|---|
| 1. | "Beyond the Wheel" | 7:09 |
| 2. | "Get on the Snake" | 3:25 |
| 3. | "Hunted Down" | 2:44 |
| 4. | "I Awake" | 4:11 |
| 5. | "Gun" | 6:08 |
| 6. | "Big Dumb Sex" | 3:55 |
| 7. | "Big Bottom" | 4:53 |
| 8. | "Earache My Eye" | 5:47 |

=== Promotional LP ===
Side A
| No. | Title | Length |
|---|---|---|
| 1. | "Beyond the Wheel" | 6:22 |
| 2. | "Gun" | 5:14 |
| 3. | "Get on the Snake" | 3:26 |
| 4. | "I Awake" | 3:52 |

Side B
| No. | Title | Length |
|---|---|---|
| 1. | "Big Dumb Sex" | 3:56 |
| 2. | "Big Bottom/Earache My Eye" | 10:39 |

These recordings were also temporarily available for streaming under the title "Gun (Recorded live at Whisky a Go Go 1990)" through Spotify.

== Personnel ==
Soundgarden

- Matt Cameron – drums
- Chris Cornell – lead vocals, rhythm guitar
- Jason Everman – bass
- Kim Thayil – lead guitar

Production

- Kevin Kerslake – film director

Additional editing by Mark Miremont

== Chart positions ==
| Chart (1990) | Peak position |
|---|---|
| US Top Music Videos | 15 |
