= Dirt Room =

Single by Blue October

from the album Approaching Normal
- Released: December 23, 2008
- Genre: Alternative rock; art rock; hard rock; post-punk revival
- Length: 3:24
- Label: Universal Records
- Songwriters: Justin Furstenfeld, C.B. Hudson III*-, Jeremy Furstenfeld, Ryan Delahoussaye, Matt Noveskey
- Producer: Steve Lillywhite

Blue October singles chronology
"Calling You" (2007)	"Dirt Room" (2008)	"Say It" (2009)

Music video
- "Dirt Room" on YouTube

"Dirt Room" was the first single from alternative rock band Blue October's fifth studio album, Approaching Normal. The song was released to digital outlet stores on December 23, 2008, and to radio on January 13, 2009. An acoustic version of the song was included on the band's album Ugly Side: An Acoustic Evening With Blue October, and a live electric version appears on the live album/concert film Things We Do At Night - Live From Texas.

== Music video ==
The music video premiered on Yahoo! Music on January 27, 2009, and was directed by Kevin Kerslake. It is centered around a robber (played by frontman Justin Furstenfeld) who is captured by his attempted victim. He is tied up and the captor threatens him with premature burial. At the end of the video he is placed in an open grave and viewed by a great deal of people, including two police officers. These scenes are intercut with footage of the band playing the song in the living room of the captor's house. The music video shows Justin burning a hundred dollar bill with the initials "M.R." clearly displayed to the camera before the flames erupt. The band later revealed that the initials "M.R." refer to Michael Rand, their former manager who sued them for $1 million, claiming he was owed a cut from the sales of their multi-platinum album Foiled, even though their business relationship ended several years prior.

== Meaning discussed ==
During the hushed period, Furstenfeld told Music Interviews Now: "That song is about not being a passive idiot anymore and not letting people take advantage of you anymore just because of who you are. I wouldn't say that we're famous… we are just normal people that get put on TV and stuff. That is just who we are… so if that makes us famous like the E! Entertainment crap, that's not us. People want to see you in that part and think you are rich, and they start to come out of the wood work…and they start asking for things over and over again, and that song's about just taking it too far. There was an incident that happened, I can't even talk about it… but I took care of it, wrote the song, and that's my revenge. I use my words as weapons. No one will take advantage of my family again. I usually do all the writing and on this new album everyone did some writing and it was really special to me."

In a later interview, Justin was able to be more candid about the song's true meaning. "But that song really brought out this more confidence side of me and not the, ‘Oh hate me because I am bad’ side – I don’t do drugs anymore and I don’t f*ck with that stuff, I have a daughter now so if anybody wants to take food off of her plate then they are going to have to come straight through me whether it be verbally, and I hope not physically because I try to teach self-expression instead of physical violence! You know?"

== Chart positions ==
Chart (2009)	Peak position
U.S. Billboard Hot Modern Rock Tracks	7
U.S. Billboard Hot Mainstream Rock Tracks	31
