= Kevin Kerslake =

American filmmaker and photographer

- Occupations: Filmmaker; photographer; cinematographer; music video director
- Website: kevinkerslake.com

Kevin Kerslake is an American filmmaker, photographer, cinematographer, and music video director. He has directed documentaries on Joan Jett (Bad Reputation), DJ AM (As I AM: The Life and Times of DJ AM), The Ramones (We're Outta Here!), Nirvana (Live! Tonight! Sold Out!!), Bob Marley & the Wailers (Legend Remixed), Soundgarden (Louder Than Live and Motorvision), The Interrupters (This Is My Family), Insomniac (Electric Daisy Carnival, Nocturnal Wonderland and The Electric Daisy Carnival Experience), among others. Television work includes scripted series on Fox (The Visitor), ABC Family (Fallen), and Vevo (Tim Timebomb's RockNRoll Theater), plus segments on the Academy Awards (Mominees), Billboard Music Awards (Billboard Millennium Award - Beyoncé), and Breakthrough Prizes in Fundamental Physics & Life Sciences.

Kerslake started his career in film by making surf, skate, and ski films throughout his teens as well as forensic videos and photography. He began directing music videos in the late 1980s, winning several awards throughout the 1990s and 2000s for popular rock and alternative rock bands. Kerslake has directed music videos for Iggy Pop, Cypress Hill, Mazzy Star, Prince, The Rolling Stones, Liz Phair, Stone Temple Pilots, Filter, R.E.M., 311, Blue October, Faith No More, Soundgarden, Green Day, Depeche Mode, The Smashing Pumpkins, Helmet, Red Hot Chili Peppers, Nirvana, Sonic Youth, Rise Against, Sam Phillips, The Offspring, Throwing Muses, Mr. Bungle, Rancid, Atreyu, Blink 182, 10 Years, Bush, and Velvet Revolver.

Kerslake has directed commercials and brand-integrated campaigns for AT&T, Hyundai, Nike, Puma, Reebok, DC Shoes, Burton, Coca-Cola, Sprite, PlayStation, PETA, Doctors Without Borders, and Amnesty International.

Kerslake has photographed Sting, David Bowie, Quentin Tarantino, Neil Young, Scott Weiland, Mazzy Star, Mister Cartoon, DJ Muggs, James Cameron, Peter Beard, Lee "Scratch" Perry, JPEGMafia, Henry Rollins, Sandra Oh, Sarah Polley, The Strokes, Korn, Liz Phair and others for Ray Gun, Flaunt, Compaq, Huh, Bikini, Premiere, Newsweek, Flood, Blind Spot, Amnesty International, Sony Music, Spin, Universal Music Group, Tuff Gong, and Athleta.

The Offspring guitarist Noodles has praised Kerslake's unique videos as very "off the wall".

== Filmography ==
Film

- Louder Than Live (1990)
- Motorvision (1992)
- Live! Tonight! Sold Out!! (1994)
- We're Outta Here! (1997)
- Electric Daisy Carnival Experience (2011)
- Legend Remixed (2013)
- As I AM: The Life and Times of DJ AM (2015)
- Bad Reputation (2018)
- This Is My Family (2021)

Television

- The Visitor (1997), "Pilot", "Caged"
- Fallen (2007)
- Tim Timebomb's RockNRoll Theater (2011)

== Videography ==
1986

- "Shadow of a Doubt" by Sonic Youth

1987

- "Beauty Lies in the Eye" by Sonic Youth
- "Litany" by Guadalcanal Diary
- "Happy Nightmare Baby" by Opal
- "It's All Changed" by The Royal Court of China
- "Before Too Long" (Version 2) by Paul Kelly and the Messengers
- "In Your Eyes" by The Reivers

1988

- "Get It On" by Kingdom Come
- "What Love Can Be" by Kingdom Come
- "High on You" by Iggy Pop
- "Snake Handler" by Divine Horsemen
- "Sometime to Return" by Soul Asylum
- "Revolution" by Well Well Well

1989

- "Candle" by Sonic Youth
- "Loud Love" by Soundgarden
- "Deep Blue" by Fetchin Bones

1990

- "Hands All Over" by Soundgarden
- "Halah" by Mazzy Star
- "It's Too Late" by Bob Mould
- "Too Many Puppies" by Primus
- "Prayer for the Dying" by Mind Over Four
- "Pearle" by Trip Shakespeare
- "Home" by Naked Raygun
- "Beg to Differ" by Prong
- "Deeper Shade of Soul" by Urban Dance Squad

1991

- "Swan Dive" by Bullet LaVolta
- "Travolta" by Mr. Bungle
- "Vapour Trail" by Ride
- "3 Strange Days" by School of Fish
- "Garbadge Man" by Hole

1992

- "Chowder Town" by Walt Mink
- "I Am One" by The Smashing Pumpkins
- "Leave Them All Behind" by Ride
- "This Love" by Pantera
- "Come as You Are" by Nirvana
- "Midlife Crisis" by Faith No More
- "Lithium" by Nirvana
- "Unsung" by Helmet
- "California Here I Come" by Sophie B. Hawkins
- "My Name Is Prince" by Prince
- "Everything's Ruined" by Faith No More
- "In Bloom" (version 2) by Nirvana

1993

- "Otha Fish" by The Pharcyde
- "Sliver" by Nirvana
- "The Sidewinder Sleeps Tonite" by R.E.M.
- "One Caress" by Depeche Mode
- "Superdeformed" by Matthew Sweet
- "Sodajerk" by Buffalo Tom
- "The Ghost at Number One" by Jellyfish
- "Soul to Squeeze" by Red Hot Chili Peppers
- "Cherub Rock" by The Smashing Pumpkins
- "Take Me Anywhere" by School of Fish
- "Fade into You" (version 1) by Mazzy Star
- "Goin' Home" by Dinosaur Jr.
- "Face Down" by Monster Magnet
- "Crash Today" by Eleven
- "Omission" by Quicksand
- "New French Girlfriend" by The Auteurs

1994

- "Freezing Process" by Quicksand
- "Selling the Drama" by Live
- "Vasoline" by Stone Temple Pilots
- "I Need Love" by Sam Phillips
- "Interstate Love Song" by Stone Temple Pilots
- "Cure Me or Kill Me" by Gilby Clarke
- "Bright Yellow Gun" by Throwing Muses

1995

- "Mockingbird Girl" by The Magnificent Bastards
- "Blowout in the Radio Room" by Fight
- "She's a River" by Simple Minds
- "I Go Wild" (version 1) by The Rolling Stones
- "Hey Man Nice Shot by Filter
- "If I Were You" by k.d. lang
- "She's Lost Control" by Girls Against Boys
- "Dose" by Filter
- "Run" by Schtum
- "Glycerine" by Bush

1996

- "Brain Stew / Jaded" by Green Day
- "Hate You" by Daredevils
- "Shredding the Document" by John Hiatt
- "Flowers in December" by Mazzy Star

1997

- "Halls of Illusions" by Insane Clown Posse
- "The Meaning of Life" by The Offspring

1998

- "Forgiven" by Wank
- "Polyester Bride" by Liz Phair
- "Sometimes It Hurts" by Stabbing Westward
- "Sherry Fraser" by Marcy Playground
- "Tequila Sunrise" by Cypress Hill

1999

- "Come Original" by 311

2001

- "Just So You Know" by American Head Charge
- "Girl Inside My Head" by Blues Traveler
- "Days of the Week" by Stone Temple Pilots

2002

- "Not Today" by Hotwire
- "Huffer" by The Breeders
- "Beat Me" by Custom
- "The Energy" by Audiovent
- "Rise Above" by Henry Rollins

2003

- "Unstable" by Adema

2004

- "Slither" by Velvet Revolver
- "Fall to Pieces" by Velvet Revolver
- "True" by Ryan Cabrera

2005

- "I Caught Fire" by The Used
- "We Don't Care Anymore" by Story of the Year
- "Bulletproof Skin" by Institute
- "Shine On" by Ryan Cabrera

2006

- "Wasteland" (version 2) by 10 Years
- "Alive with the Glory of Love" by Say Anything
- "Whiskey" by John Corbett
- "Good to Go" by John Corbett
- "Hate Me" by Blue October
- "Ready to Fall" by Rise Against
- "This Is the End (For You My Friend)" by Anti-Flag
- "...To Be Loved" by Papa Roach

2007

- "(You Want To) Make a Memory" by Bon Jovi
- "Becoming the Bull" by Atreyu

2008

- "What About Now" by Daughtry
- "Re-Education (Through Labor)" by Rise Against
- "Missing Cleveland" by Scott Weiland

2009

- "Dirt Room" by Blue October
- "Young" by Hollywood Undead
- "Say It" by Blue October
- "Savior" by Rise Against
- "Last One to Die" by Rancid
- "Up to No Good" by Rancid

2012

- "L.A. Funky" by Destructo featuring Oliver
- "Push 'Em" by Travis Barker and Yelawolf
- "Six Feet Underground" by Travis Barker and Yelawolf
- "Change That Song Mr. DJ" by Tim Timebomb
- "She's Drunk All the Time" by Tim Timebomb
- "Thirty Pieces of Silver" by Tim Timebomb
- "Trouble" by Tim Timebomb

2013

- "My Bucket's Got a Hole in It" by Tim Timebomb
- "Any Weather" by Joan Jett

2016

- "Bang Bang" by Green Day (director of photography)
- "Frequency" by Kid Cudi (director of photography)
- "Surfin'" by Kid Cudi (director of photography)

2018

- "When Bad Does Good" by Chris Cornell

2019

- "Generational Divide" by Blink-182

2020

- "Once Were Brothers" by Robbie Robertson

2023

- "Spellbinding" by The Smashing Pumpkins
