= Alex Giannini =

English actor & singer (1958–2015)

- Publicity Photo of Alex Giannini
- Born: Alexander von Giannini; 6 June 1958; Northamptonshire, England
- Died: 2 October 2015 (aged 57)

Alexander von Giannini (6 June 1958 – 2 October 2015) was an English stage, television and film actor and singer. His work included comedy, musicals and drama.

== Life ==
Giannini was born in Northamptonshire in 1958; his father was born in Rome, his mother was English. He was educated in England, Italy and in Luxembourg, where his father worked for the European Commission.

He was the lead singer, as Sandy Fontaine, of the band Coast to Coast, which appeared on Top of the Pops; the group disbanded in 1982. He was inspired to become an actor on reading Steven Berkoff's play East, and later graduated from East 15 Acting School.

=== Acting career ===
Giannini appeared in the musical Guys and Dolls, as Harry the Horse, at the National Theatre. In 1999 he was in the original Broadway production of Not about Nightingales, a long-lost play by Tennessee Williams; the play ran for five months. In 2003 he was Dean Martin in Rat Pack Confidential, at the Whitehall Theatre. Further stage appearances in London included One Flew Over the Cuckoo's Nest at the Garrick Theatre in 2004; Journey's End at the Ambassadors Theatre in 2005; as Big Mac in Steven Berkoff's revival of On the Waterfront at the Haymarket Theatre in 2009. In 2011 he was in Batman Live, as The Penguin and Commissioner Gordon: the show toured the UK, Europe, and North and South America.

Film appearances included In Love and War (1996); Elizabeth: The Golden Age (2007), Legend (2015) as Antonio Caponigro, and London Has Fallen (2016). On TV he was seen in Inspector Morse, Dalziel and Pascoe, The Musketeers, The Bill and others. In Italy he appeared in a series of TV commercials for olive oil, which ran for five years.

Alex Giannini died of a heart attack, an hour before he was due on stage at the Theatre Royal, Plymouth, in Chichester Festival Theatre's production of Mack and Mabel; he was 57.

=== Family ===
An early marriage to Linda Drew was dissolved, and in 1998 he married Jennifer Secombe, daughter of Harry Secombe; there were three stepchildren. Jennifer Secombe died in 2019.

== Filmography ==
Year	Title	Role	Notes
1992	The Ballad of Kid Divine: The Cockney Cowboy	Sheriff Dan Johnson	
1993	Pen Pals	Bruce	
1995	The Innocent Sleep	Thug	
1996	In Love and War	Sergeant Ancona	Uncredited
1998	Miss Monday	Steven	
2000	P.O.V.	Big Shot TV Executive	
2007	Elizabeth: The Golden Age	First Spanish Officer	
2014	Flim: The Movie	Max	
2015	Legend	Tony Caponigro	
2016	London Has Fallen	Antonio Gusto	(final film role)
