= Hands All Over (Soundgarden song) =

1990 single by Soundgarden

Single by Soundgarden

from the album Louder Than Love
- B-side: "Come Together" "Heretic" "Big Dumb Sex"
- Released: April 9, 1990 (UK)
- Studio: London Bridge (Seattle, Washington)
- Genre: Alternative metal
- Length: 6:00
- Label: A&M
- Composer: Kim Thayil
- Lyricist: Chris Cornell
- Producers: Terry Date; Soundgarden

Soundgarden singles chronology
"Loud Love" (1989)	"Hands All Over" (1990)	"Room a Thousand Years Wide" (1990)

Music video
- "Hands All Over" on YouTube

"Hands All Over" is a song by the American rock band Soundgarden. Featuring lyrics written by frontman Chris Cornell and music written by guitarist Kim Thayil, "Hands All Over" was released in 1990 as the second single from the band's second studio album, Louder Than Love (1989). It also appeared on the band's EP Loudest Love, released in 1990. The song was included on Soundgarden's 1997 greatest hits album, A-Sides, as well as on the band's 2010 compilation album, Telephantasm.

== Composition ==
"Hands All Over" sample
The song "combines an Eastern-tinged rock riff in an extended arrangement. Guitars chime on a single note amongst a wash of cymbals, Cornell doing his best 'Islamic call', while Thayil foreshadows the vocal melody with a lilting lick."

"Hands All Over" features lyrics written by frontman Chris Cornell and music written by guitarist Kim Thayil. The song is in the key of D major. Thayil on the song:

What I liked about the song was that it was just one simple riff—one note, one chord—but with a lot of dynamics. In some ways it's simple and basic; in other ways, it's very sophisticated in how it was layered. We don't really have many songs that are like "Hands All Over".

== Lyrics ==
Regarding "Hands All Over", Cornell said that "it's just sort of an environmental thing. Not strictly environmental, but mostly. It's basically about how we humans tend to screw up everything that's good enough as it is ... or everything that we're attracted to, we love to go and defile it." Thayil wrote that the song "addresses the failure of mankind to just leave things alone and stop destroying the world around them."

== Release and reception ==
The single for "Hands All Over" marked the beginning of Soundgarden having cover versions as B-sides. The B-side to the single is a cover of The Beatles song "Come Together". Producer Jack Endino provided the backing vocals on the song. This was also the last time that Soundgarden recorded with him. Outside the United States, the single was released commercially in Australia and the United Kingdom.

Due to some of the lyrics contained in the song (most notably the "kill your mother" line), this song and "Big Dumb Sex" led to the band facing various retail and distribution problems upon the release of Louder Than Love. Tom Maginnis of AllMusic called "Hands All Over" a "walloping behemoth of a track". He said, "The song combines an Eastern-tinged rock riff in an extended arrangement, as singer Chris Cornell airs out his impressive lung capacity while lyrically taking a stab at environmental politics." J. D. Considine of Rolling Stone said that the song "applies swooping bass and jazzily vigorous drumming to counterbalance the static intensity of the song's bone-simple guitar hook."

== Music video ==
The music video for "Hands All Over" was directed by Kevin Kerslake, who had previously directed the "Loud Love" music video for the band. The video was shot in a factory and features the band members swinging on equipment amid scenes of the band performing the song. Thayil described the video as "one of the lamest ever made. It really sucked." Cornell added, "Making this video was fun because we were in a steel foundry. And there was like a black cancer dust all over everything. We're all gonna get cancer from it and die. So I hope you enjoy it. This will be the video that killed Soundgarden." The video was released in January 1990. The video is available on the home video release Louder Than Live.

== Track listing ==
Promotional CD (US) and Promotional 12" Vinyl (US)

1. "Hands All Over" (Chris Cornell, Kim Thayil) – 6:00
2. "Come Together" (John Lennon, Paul McCartney) – 5:52

Promotional Cassette (US) and 7" Vinyl (Australia)

1. "Hands All Over" (Cornell, Thayil) – 6:00

7" Vinyl (Australia)

1. "Hands All Over" (Cornell, Thayil) – 6:00
2. "Big Bottom" (live) (Spinal Tap) – 4:58
  - Recorded live on December 10, 1989 at the Whisky a Go Go in Los Angeles, California.

CD (UK) and 10" Vinyl (UK)

1. "Hands All Over" (Cornell, Thayil) – 6:00
2. "Come Together" (Lennon, McCartney) – 5:52
3. "Heretic" (Thayil, Hiro Yamamoto) – 3:48
4. "Big Dumb Sex" (Cornell) – 4:11

== Personnel ==
- Chris Cornell – vocals, rhythm guitar
- Kim Thayil – lead guitar
- Hiro Yamamoto – bass
- Matt Cameron – drums

== Charts ==
Chart (1990)	Position
UK Singles (Official Charts)	82
