= Coast to Coast (band) =

British band

Coast to Coast were a British band from Wellingborough, Northamptonshire, that was signed to Polydor Records. They are best known for their 1981 top 5 hit in the UK with "(Do) The Hucklebuck".

== Career ==
The band were formed in 1977 by bassist Bud Smith and guitarist Bob Debank, who recruited Alan Mills as lead vocalist, Graham Woofe on drums and, later, saxophonist Sonnie Torlot. Earl Barton replaced Woofe at a later date.

The band's best-known single, a cover version of the rock and roll classic "The Hucklebuck", was recorded in 1980 and reached number 5 on the UK Singles Chart the following year. However, tensions surfaced between band members and Mills left before the song became successful, to be replaced by Sandy Fontaine (born Alex Giannini). Although the British Hit Singles & Albums book cites Fontaine as the singer for the single, it was actually Mills' vocal that appeared, with Fontaine's vocal dubbed onto the album version.

The follow-up release, a cover version of "Let's Jump the Broomstick", peaked at number 28 in June 1981.

The group disbanded in 1982. Lead singer Alan Mills died on 21 July 2016, whilst replacement lead singer Sandy Fontaine (Alex Giannini) died on 2 October 2015.

== Band members ==
- Alan Mills (vocals) 1975–1980
- Sandy Fontaine (vocals) 1980–1982
- Sonnie Torlot (sax, vocals) 1978–1982
- Jamie Ling (guitar, vocals) 1976–1982
- Bud Smith (bass, vocals) 1975-late 1979 then rejoining in 1980 to late 1982
- Earl Barton (drums) 1980–1982
- Bob Debank (guitarist, vocals) 1975–1979 (founder member along with Bud Smith) departed from the band before signing a record contract with Polydor.

== Discography ==
=== Albums ===
- Coastin' (1981)

=== Singles and EPs ===
Year	Title	UK	GER	AUS	Label
1978	Coast to Coast EP	–	–	–	Yorkie
1979	"The Hucklebuck"	–	–	–	Yorkie
1980	"(Do) the Hucklebuck"	5	37	70	Polydor
1981	"Let's Jump the Broomstick"	28	–	–	Polydor
1981	"Coastin'"	76	–	–	Polydor
1981	"Baby Why Let Go"	–	–	–	Polydor
1982	"Dance On"	–	–	–	Polydor
