= The Hot Sardines =

American jazz band

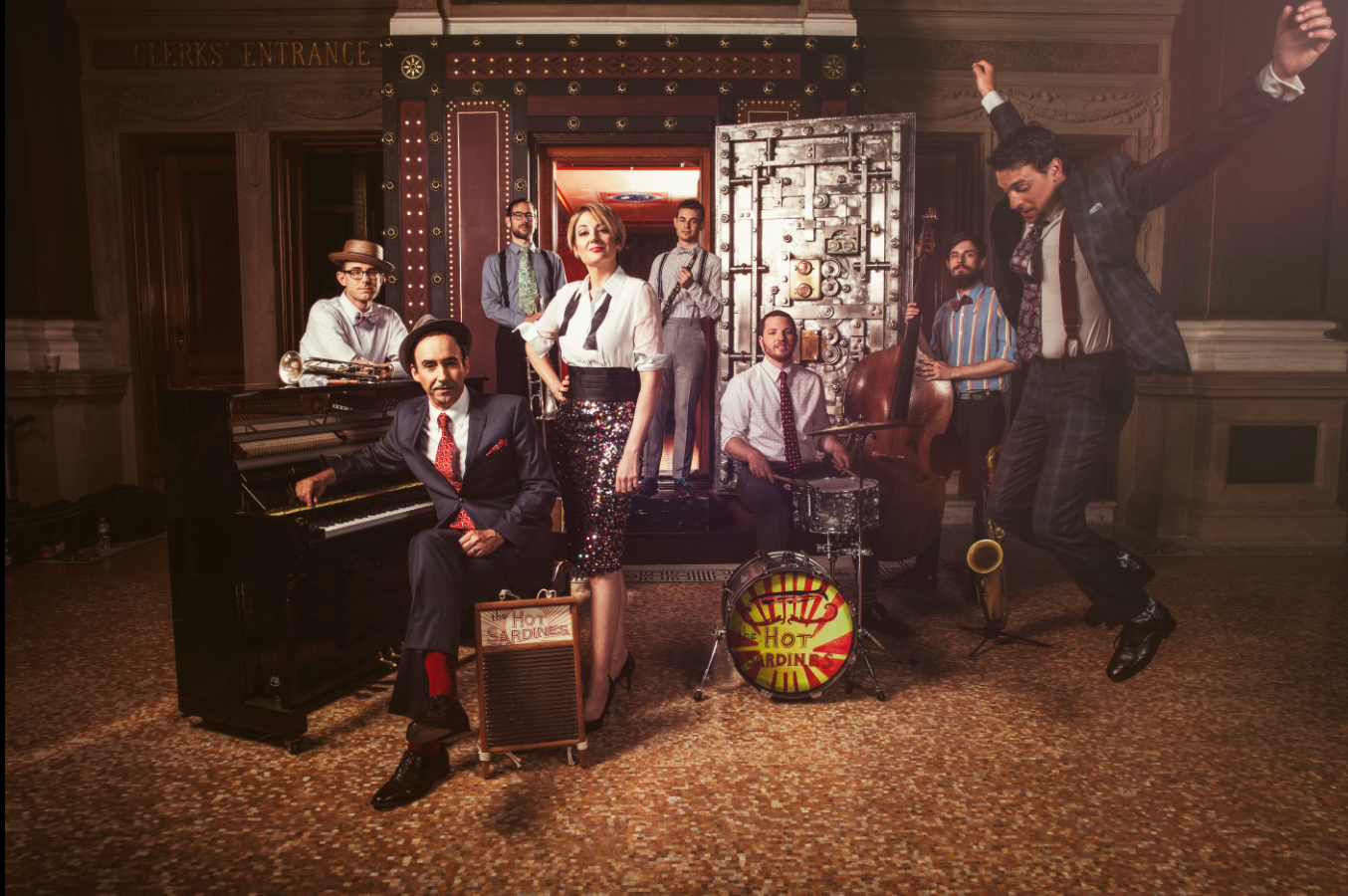
- Photograph by LeAnn Mueller

Background information
- Origin: New York City, United States
- Genres: Hot jazz; swing; stride; ragtime; chanson
- Years active: 2007–present
- Labels: Eleven; Decca/Universal
- Members: See full list
- Website: hotsardines.com

The Hot Sardines is an American jazz band formed in New York City in 2007 by the artistic director, singer, and writer Elizabeth Bougerol and the artistic director, actor, and pianist Evan Palazzo. The Sardines emphasize both authenticity and irreverence in their performances.

== History ==
=== New York City origins (2006–2007) ===
Evan Palazzo, the bandleader and pianist, is a native New Yorker. He began playing piano by ear at age three and was beguiled by amateur musicianship his whole life. As a boy, he aspired to be "a performer and an entertainer, but also a combination of Rick Blaine and Victor Laszlo." He was a student at the Waldorf school in New York City and went on to major in theater and musical theater at the University of the Arts in Philadelphia. He developed a passion for jazz in general and playing stride jazz piano in particular. Returning to the Big Apple, he made a living as an actor in theater and film production, as well as continued working on his music. In 2007, he released an album titled Finding His Stride featuring his special brand of stride piano music with a "ragged" rhythm. For a while Evan was a trouper in chanteuse Lauren Ambrose's band, The Leisure Class. He appeared in scenes playing the piano in several films. His spouse, actress Jennifer Weedon, knowing of Evan's desire to start a jazz band, placed an ad on Craigslist for him. Soon Evan was getting together with other musicians for informal jam sessions.

Elizabeth Bougerol, the band's frontwoman, vocalist and occasional washboard player, was born in Neuilly-sur-Seine near Paris. She grew up in France, the Ivory Coast, and Canada. While young, she initially wanted to be a vet but did not have the stomach for it. She earned a bachelor's degree from Brock University and a master's degree from the London School of Economics. She edited city guides on the internet and created editorial websites as well as writing freelance for magazines and book projects. Like Palazzo, she nurtured a lifelong passion for music, especially pop from the 1920s to 1950s – performed by the likes of Fats Waller and Ray Charles. An autodidactic singer, she haunted live performance venues in New York City, imploring her favorite artists for the opportunity to sing with them. However, although naturally gifted with "a sweet and soulful voice," she nevertheless was turned down because she had no professional background. Undaunted, she taught herself to play the washboard–jug band style and began placing advertisements on Craigslist searching for others who shared her fervid enthusiasm for early jazz.

Serendipitously, Evan and Elizabeth both answered the same Craigslist ad for a traditional jazz jam occurring at a noodle shop near Times Square in Manhattan. Elizabeth recalled the chance encounter "was like an instant musical connection. We started trading stories of songs and singers we loved while growing up, naming our biggest influences and trying out tunes together." They discovered their mutual admiration of Louis Armstrong and Harlem stride style jazz legend Thomas "Fats" Waller. "I started playing [Fats Waller's] 'Your Feet's Too Big' on the piano and Elizabeth joined in like we'd been singing that duet together for decades," Palazzo recalled. Elizabeth recounted how "everyone else in the room just faded away while we geeked out."

The duo began regularly meeting to play music for their own enjoyment. A college acquaintance of Evan's – or "Bibs" as he came to be known – heard that they might be looking for a tap dancer for the band and put them in touch with their first hoofer, Edwin "Fast Eddy" Francisco. Eddy stopped by Evan's domicile while they were rehearsing and began to tap along to the music. Elizabeth accompanied Eddy's rhythmic tapping on a DublHandi washboard that she had purchased at a nearby hardware store. Thus the early Sardines tap-and-washboard percussion section was born.

An hour later, the intrepid trio departed for their first open-mic gig at a coffeehouse on the last Q train stop in Queens. They had to list a name on the call sheet for their group to perform at the event. They wanted "hot" in the name to indicate the kind of jazz they played, something like Louis Armstrong's Hot Five and Hot Seven groups. Inspired by a tin of spicy sardines that Elizabeth had found at a grocery, they christened the band as The Hot Sardines.

=== Early years and debut album (2007–2010) ===
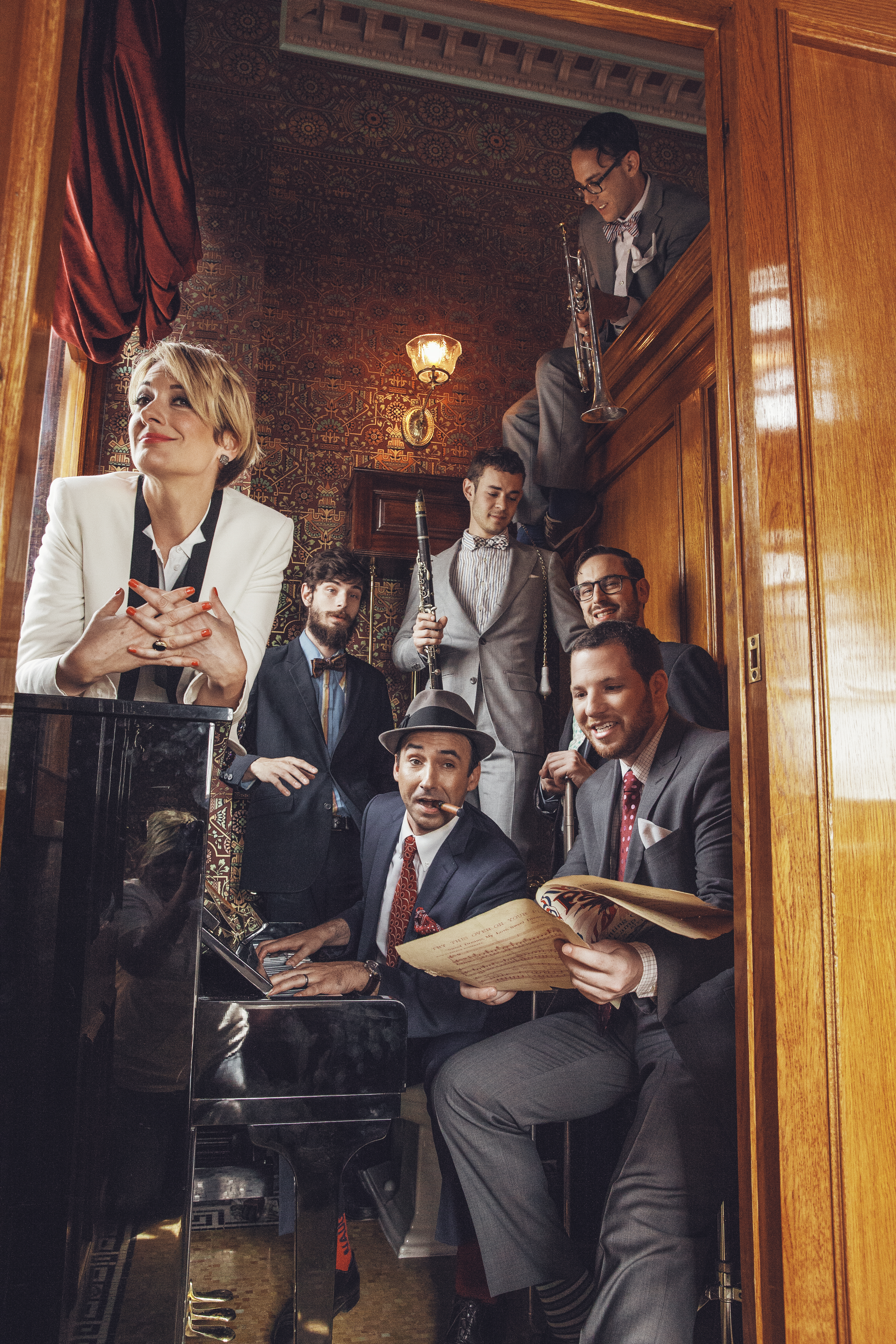
"Miz Elizabeth" Bougerol on left. Top to bottom: Jason Prover, Nick Myers, Joe McDonough, Evan Crane, Alex Raderman, Evan "Bibs" Palazzo. (Photo by LeAnn Mueller.)

For several years, The Hot Sardines played free gigs for friends and at small open-mic venues such as the now-shuttered Banjo Jim's on the Lower East Side. During this time, the band was "playing in New York for anyone we could get to listen to us, busking in the subway and dragging friends out to look for bars with open mikes." Unexpectedly, they became part of an alcohol-fueled flash mob scene "in New York, where people go online and find the location and the secret password, and then 300 people show up dressed in vintage attire and party the night away."

"We never intended to start a professional outfit," Palazzo said regarding their formative years. "We wanted to do it has a hobby, [but] we found ourselves getting gigs." Over the next couple of years the band attracted musicians from prestigious institutions like the Juilliard School and Berklee, accomplished professionals who were unafraid to "get down and dirty" with early American jazz. Slowly, the core group of the band grew to a septet and then an octet, with Mike Sailors on cornet, Jason Prover on trumpet, Evan "Sugar" Crane on sousaphone and bass, Nick Myers on saxophone and clarinet, and Alex "Tastykakes" Raderman on drums.

During the economic downturn known as the Great Recession, the band fortuitously benefited from the mid-2010s hot jazz revival, a Millennial cultural phenomenon emanating from Brooklyn. As a result, there began in New York a "cyclical burst of Jazz Age nostalgia," and this hot jazz revival attracted "a young, fresh crowd" that clamored for a particular strain of throwback jazz "that once would have put it under the Dixieland heading." This revival was largely ascribed to the popularity of television programs such as Martin Scorsese's Boardwalk Empire which renewed interest in the Roaring Twenties and, in particular, the frenzied underground music of the Prohibition-era speakeasies.

Amid this jazz revival, a turning point for the Hot Sardines came in 2010 when they performed for the first time at the speakeasy-themed Shanghai Mermaid, a 6,000-square-foot warehouse behind an unmarked door in Crown Heights. During the apex of the economic recession, the "extravagantly theatrical" Mermaid recreated the decadent atmosphere of a red-walled 1930s cabaret and was the epicenter of the throwback jazz scene, with monthly underground costume parties and aerialists swinging from the ceiling. Due to its local prestige, performing at the Mermaid was deemed a coming-of-age moment in the band's evolution. "We all [still] love playing at the Shanghai Mermaid," Palazzo stated in 2015, "it's about as close as you can get to time-travel to the 1930s."

Soon after, the Sardines' next big break occurred in June 2011 due to Bougerol's ability to sing in both English and French. She had received a cryptic email stating that an unidentified third party was seeking a jazz band that could perform songs in French for a last-minute gig on the forthcoming Bastille Day. She submitted a few video clips of the band's past performances, and they clinched the job. It turned out that the gig was Midsummer Night Swing at the Lincoln Center for the Performing Arts. They performed before a youthful audience of 7,000 swing dancers and brought down the house. After headlining at Lincoln Center, they were "heralded as one of the greatest jazz acts to come out of New York City." Soon after, they served as openers for the jazz trio Bad Plus and French gypsy-jazz artist Zaz.

High-profile gigs started rolling in, and the Sardines' debut album Shanghai'd premiered in July 2011 to favorable reviews. They went on to have 17 consecutive sold-out shows at Joe's Pub starting in 2012. The Sardines were soon invited in 2012 to represent New York in front of 25,000 spectators at Festival d'Île de France in Paris.

=== Further albums and tours (2012–present) ===
"Bei Mir Bistu Shein" (2014)
Sample of the 1932 Yiddish song "Bei Mir Bistu Shein" which appeared on The Hot Sardines (2014) album.

During the next several years, the Sardines released several follow-up albums via the Eleven Records label including Comes Love (December 2013), The Hot Sardines' Lowdown Little Christmas Record (December 2013), and Sardine 3: Frolicking at the Playground (February 2014) recorded at The Music Playground.

Due to their success, larger record labels such as Decca/Universal Music Classics began taking an interest in the piscine troupe. Subsequently, their first major label album – eponymously titled The Hot Sardines – was released on the Decca/Universal label in October 2014. This 2014 self-titled album contained both jazz classics and original Sardines' compositions and reached number 12 on the Billboard charts in August 2015, as well as went to No. 1 on the iTunes Jazz charts in the U.S. and U.K. It remained in the top 10 on the Billboard Jazz Chart for more than a year. Meanwhile, the band continued their frequent pilgrimages to Joe's Pub, Shanghai Mermaid, and Midsummer Night Swing. They became virtual regulars, if not inmates, at André Balazs' posh Top of the Standard.

In 2014, they performed at the Montreal International Jazz Festival. They played to sold-out appearances at Symphony Hall accompanied by the Boston Pops, with their songs arranged for the orchestra by Tony Award-winner Bill Elliott. The song "Wake Up in Paris" – written by Bougerol – made its debut at The Pops' shows and was duly praised. "The real stunner was 'Wake Up in Paris'," wrote The Boston Globe at the time, adding that "with sweet, lush, Technicolor strings, it was hard to imagine how it could possibly work without orchestral accompaniment. But work it did." (The Globe also noted the presence of Sardines' fans who had attended in flapper cosplay attire.)

Later that year, in October 2014, the Sardines headlined the grand reopening of the Rainbow Room located on the 65th floor of 30 Rockefeller Plaza, an Art Deco-skyscraper in Midtown Manhattan. Traveling across the Atlantic Ocean, the "flaming little fishes" made a splash with their London debut in the Purcell Room at Queen Elizabeth Hall in November 2014. Their tour proved a success due to the popularity of American jazz in European countries. (They also appeared annually from 2012 to 2016 as the musical headliners on the short-lived TCM Film Cruise, hosted by Robert Osborne and Ben Mankiewicz, where the band entertained fans of classic and pre-code cinema amid anchorages in the Bahamas.)

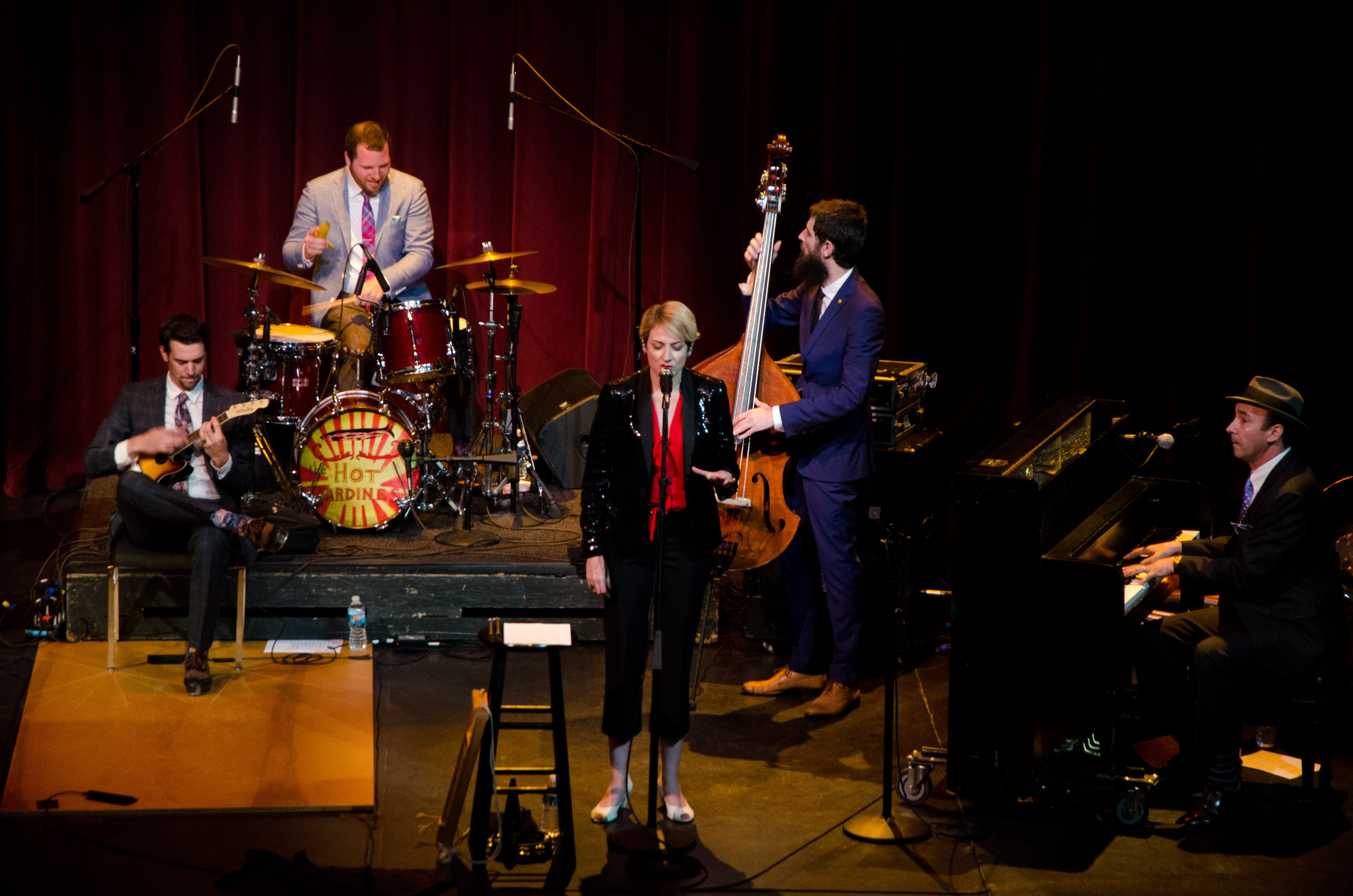
The Sardines performing in 2015 at Texas A&M University.

On June 16, 2016, the troupe released French Fries + Champagne, their second album on the Decca/Universal label, which featured Tony-winning thespian Alan Cumming on one of the standout tracks, "When I Get Low I Get High" (originally recorded in 1936 by Ella Fitzgerald). A tongue-in-cheek music video with Cumming and Bougerol performing the song was released the same day on YouTube and gradually amassed nearly one million views. The band described the video's unique visuals as a "Weimar acid trip." French Fries + Champagne debuted at No. 5 on Billboard's Jazz Traditional Chart, No. 6 on Jazz Current and Top 20 Heatseekers Chart and was No. 1 on both iTunes' and Amazon's jazz charts.

In April 2019, the Sardines released their eighth album, Welcome Home, Bon Voyage. This live album was recorded in two originative bursts at their regular haunt, Joe's Pub, in New York and Koerner Hall in Toronto. The album's release loosely coincided with the Sardines' prolonged stopover at Club Cumming, the East Village cabaret owned by actor Alan Cumming, a "wonderfully bizarre" establishment renowned for its drag shows, knitting nights, and downtown queer fusion. (The same month, Cumming performed on stage with the Sardines during their residency at his cabaret.)

As of 2019, the Hot Sardines "have performed all over the world, notching more than 100 gigs a year." Their concerts typically attract a youthful audience who are "passionate and committed" both to swing revivalism and to experiencing how "a jazz club might have been in 1920." Reflecting upon the Sardines' continued success in 2019, critic Nate Chinen noted that "not many bands have seized the postmillennial early-jazz spotlight with as much gusto as The Hot Sardines. An eight-piece outfit [which] has devoted more than the last decade to a razzle-dazzle reclamation of prewar swing, often with a healthy dose of humor." For their own part, the Sardines remain light-hearted about their success and insist their continued goal is to promote cultural awareness of little-known 20th century jazz pioneers. "If we could contribute to that in the smallest way," Palazzo stated in a Star-Gazette interview, "our work is done."

== Band members ==
Although an eight-piece ensemble is typical for their live performances, the size of the band fluctuates. Visiting members have included:

- Tom Abbott – saxophone, clarinet
- Rob Adkins – bass
- Ricky Alexander – clarinet, saxophone
- Peter Anderson – saxophone, clarinet
- Will Anderson – saxophone, clarinet
- David Berger – drums/percussion
- Paul Brandenburg – trumpet
- Geoff Burke – reeds
- "Miz Elizabeth" Bougerol – vocals, washboard
- Evan "Sugar" Crane – bass, sousaphone
- Rob Edwards – trombone
- "Fast Eddy" Francisco – tap dancer
- Daniel Glass – percussion
- J. Walter Hawkes – trombone, ukulele
- Luke Hawkins – tap dancer
- Justin Hines – percussion
- Noah Hocker – trumpet
- Jen Hodge - bass
- Josh Holcomb – trombone, sousaphone
- Kevin Hseih – bass
- Aaron Kimmel – percussion
- Pete Lanctot – violin, phonofiddle
- Britta Langsjoen – trombone
- A.C. Lincoln – tap dancer
- Dan Lipsitz – clarinet, saxophone
- Todd Londagin – trombone
- Kevin "The Professor" McDonald – drums
- Joe McDonough – trombone
- Victor Murillo – bass
- Nick Myers – saxophone, clarinet
- Drew Nugent – trumpet, cornet
- Bob "Pinky" Parins – guitar
- Evan "Bibs" Palazzo – piano, accordion
- Jason Prover – trumpet, percussion
- Alex "Tastykakes" Raderman – drums
- Sam "Fez" Raderman – banjo, guitar
- Jay Rattman – saxophone, clarinet
- Nick Russo – guitar
- Mike Sailors – trumpet, valve trombone

== Style and influences ==
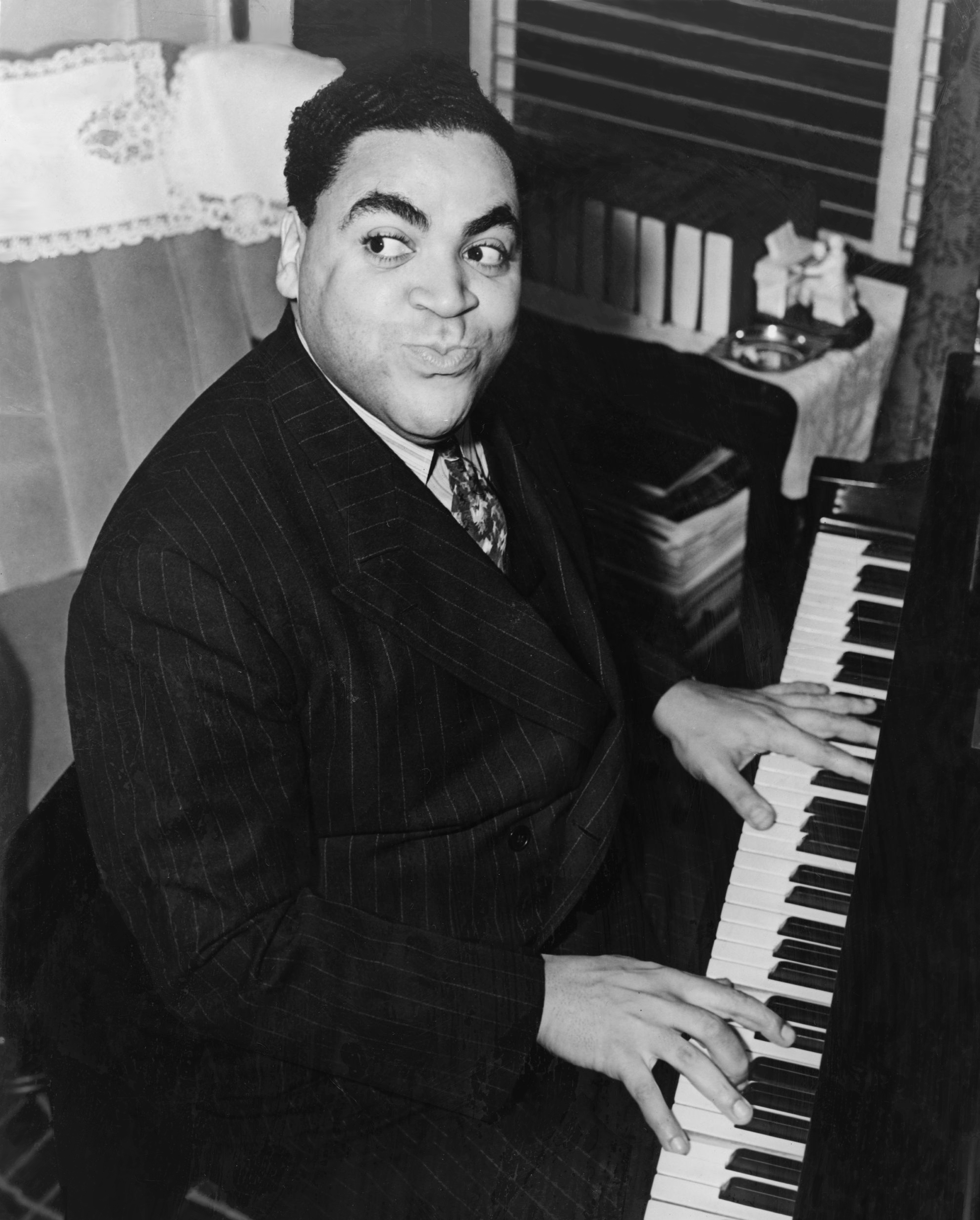
Both Palazzo and Bougerol have cited Fats Waller's Harlem stride style as one of the Sardines' key influences.

Nothing is sacred... everything from The Muppets to Bugs Bunny... has infiltrated our music and the way we interpret and perform songs.

— Evan Palazzo, Broadway World article

The Hot Sardines perform hot jazz in an irreverent yet soulful fashion as it was played "in the era when live music was king... with a little glamour, a little grit, and a lot of passion." Critics have attributed the Sardines' particular strength as performers to their interpreting early jazz as "pop music that was written a century ago." Clive Davis wrote in The Times that "one of the many virtues of the retro outfit led by the pianist Evan Palazzo and the singer Elizabeth Bougerol is that it reminds us that there was a time when jazz was a form of entertainment. That's almost a subversive notion now that the music has acquired conservatory status."

Bougerol and Palazzo have posited that hot jazz stagnated precisely because it was performed "half-heartedly and repetitively." They further posit that jazz itself lost popular favor as it became more cerebral and individualistic. "If you think of some of the more recent jazz or later jazz, it can appeal to a more intellectual experience of music… it's not about connecting everyone in the room necessarily," Bougerol stated, whereas jazz a hundred-year ago was "pop music" which emphasized "a joyous, connective experience."

In order to keep their renditions of old jazz standards fresh and exciting, the band's song preparations are "bare bones and improvised," as well as largely dictated by Palazzo mere seconds before the song's performance: "I put out signs with my hand like a catcher and call the kinds of solos we do, so every time we play a song it is slightly different. We also change set lists from night to night, and we're apt to change our set list midstream."

The band's emphasis on improvisation and gusto led the Festival d'Île de France to characterize their raucous style as "a jubilant jazz" which evokes "Renaissance Harlem cabarets." Other critics have likened the band's "unique repertoire, and a sound and style that are distinctly their own" to "a slice of between-the-wars Paris via New Orleans."

While the band writes and performs jazz-based material with an early 20th century flavor, they are influenced by an extensive variety of genres and artists. They often cite Fats Waller, Louis Armstrong, Thelonious Monk, Count Basie, Django Reinhardt, Fred Astaire, Mamie Smith, Billie Holiday, the Andrews Sisters, Duke Ellington, Jelly Roll Morton, Peggy Lee, The Mills Brothers, and Ray Charles among others.

The band also cites more modern cultural influences. Palazzo has explained that, since the band views jazz as not sacrosanct, their unpretentious interpretations draw upon an electric variety of sources encompassing "the Muppets to Bugs Bunny and from Harry Connick, Jr. to James Brown and Louis Prima." Similarly, Bougerol acknowledged that "a full-on melting pot of musicians both iconic and obscure have influenced our style and song interpretation." They even experiment a bit with Latin American beats. They view such experimentation as one of the key reasons they are able to "captivate 21st century audiences."

== Critical reception ==
Over the years, the Sardines have garnered plaudits from various critics. The Guardian dubbed them "the charismatic front-runners of vintage jazz" and, likewise, CBS News placed them "at the forefront of the vintage jazz revival." A review in The London Times averred their first live show in London was "simply phenomenal, crisp musicianship going hand in hand with immaculate and witty showmanship." PopMatters, an international online magazine of cultural criticism, called them "consistently electrifying." Forbes magazine described them as "one of the best jazz bands in New York City today." When the Sardines performed at the New York Hot Jazz Festival in May 2015, The New York Times deemed their performance to be "potent and assured."

British newspaper columnist Matthew Kassel of Observer was somewhat less glowing in a 2013 review. After admitting that he was prejudiced against any "bands that sentimentalize the past," Kassel specifically criticized the inclusion of tap dancers in the Sardines' act. He further lamented "the boater hats and the bow ties and the suspenders and the mugging that serve as a central component of the group's live shows." Regardless, Kassel conceded that "if the music is good, should any of that matter?" Accordingly, despite his professed aversion to nostalgia, Kassel nonetheless found himself "tapping [his] foot in approval of the old-fashioned world they create."

However, in a 2017 review in The Syncopated Times Eli Newberger complained that the band lacked proper reverence for jazz as a venerated art form and did not meet its requisite high standards. In particular, Newberger deprecated Palazzo's rendition of Fats Waller's music as "ponderous" and "clunky." He also objected to Bougerol's liquor-centric stage jokes as insensitive towards those who suffer from alcoholism. However, Newberger did praise "the tap dancer [A.C. Lincoln], who picked up the subtleties, syncopations and accents of the many pieces in which he took extended solo turns, demonstrating the special connection between layered rhythm and melodic variation, like the best classical jazz soloists from Louis Armstrong to 'Fats' Waller to Benny Goodman."

== Discography ==
- Shanghai'd (2011)
- Comes Love (Eleven Records, 2013)
- The Hot Sardines' Lowdown Little Christmas Record (Eleven, 2013
- Sardine 3: Frolicking at the Playground (Eleven, 2014)
- Live at Joe's Pub (2014)
- The Hot Sardines (Decca/Universal, 2014)
- French Fries + Champagne (Decca/Universal, 2016)
- Welcome Home, Bon Voyage (Eleven, 2019)
- C'est la Vie (2023)
