= Jason Everman =

American musician (born 1967)

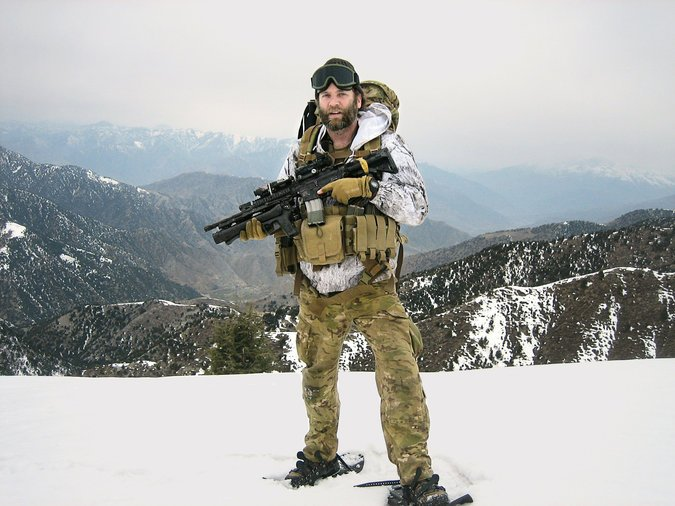
- Everman serving with the U.S. Army Special Forces in Afghanistan (from 2013 NYT article)

Background information
- Born: Jason Mark Everman; October 16, 1967 (age 58); Ouzinkie (then part of Kodiak), Alaska, U.S.
- Origin: Poulsbo, Washington, U.S.
- Genres: Alternative metal; grunge; heavy metal; death metal; grindcore; hard rock; hardcore punk
- Occupations: Musician; soldier
- Instruments: Guitar; bass
- Years active: 1989–1994; 2017–present
- Member of: Silence & Light
- Formerly of: Nirvana; Soundgarden; OLD; Mind Funk; Stonecrow
- Military career
- Allegiance: United States
- Branch: United States Army
- Service years: 1994–2006
- Rank: Sergeant First Class
- Units: 2nd Ranger Battalion; 3rd Special Forces Group
- Conflicts: War in Afghanistan; Iraq War

Jason Mark Everman (born October 16, 1967) is an American musician and soldier who played guitar with Nirvana and Mind Funk, and bass in Soundgarden and OLD. He later served tours in both Iraq and Afghanistan with the U.S. Army as an Army Ranger and Green Beret. As of May 2017, Everman plays the guitar in a military veteran band called Silence & Light.

== Early life ==
In a 2013 interview with The New York Times Magazine, Everman said when asked about his birthplace, "My birth certificate says Kodiak, but I'm pretty sure it was Ouzinkie, where my parents lived in a two-room cabin with a pet ocelot named Kia." His parents had moved to the remote Spruce Island to, as guitarist and writer Clay Tarver put it, "get back to nature", but their marriage did not "work out". His mother left with Jason when he was a toddler, moved to Washington, and married a former Navy serviceman; the family eventually settled in Poulsbo, across Puget Sound from Seattle.

According to Everman's half-sister, with whom he grew up, "My mother was extremely depressed, an artistic genius who was also a pill-popping alcoholic. Jason and I learned to walk on eggshells and really learned to take care of ourselves." After an incident in which he and a friend blew up a toilet with an M-80 firecracker, his grandmother put him in therapy sessions to deal with his emotional issues. Everman began playing guitar during the therapy sessions; he initially picked up one of the guitars the therapist kept around his office, and the therapist then decided to play with him, hoping it would help him open up. He went on to play in several bands during his high school years. He also reestablished contact with his biological father, who by that time owned a fishing boat in Alaska, and worked several seasons on the boat. Prior to joining Nirvana, he played guitar in a local band called Stonecrow with future Nirvana drummer Chad Channing.

== Early musical career ==
Everman joined Nirvana in February 1989 as a second guitarist. He is listed as being second guitarist on Nirvana's Bleach and appears on the cover, but did not actually play on any of the tracks. Nirvana founder Kurt Cobain said the credit was a token of thanks to Everman for paying a fee of $606.17 to record the album. On the 2009 remastered edition of Bleach, Everman is no longer credited but can still be seen on the front cover and he is given special thanks in the booklet.

Everman toured with Nirvana the summer of 1989 in support of Bleach. He can be heard playing guitar on Trust No-One, an unofficial release of a live performance in Boston. Cobain had broken his guitar the previous night and only provided vocals, leaving the guitar playing to Everman. Everman can also be seen in the bootleg video of Nirvana playing an in-store performance at Rhino Records in Los Angeles on June 23, 1989. During his time with Nirvana, he could sometimes be seen using Fender guitars, generally the Fender Telecaster. Nirvana fired Everman after the tour ended due to his moodiness.

A two-song Nirvana session featuring Everman on guitar is available, albeit in separate releases. A Kiss cover called "Do You Love Me?" was released on the 1990 tribute album Hard to Believe: A Kiss Covers Compilation, and "Dive" was released on 2004's With the Lights Out. Both tracks were recorded at the Evergreen State College's 24-track studio in June 1989.

Everman next joined Soundgarden in Fall of 1989 as Hiro Yamamoto's temporary successor on bass. In April of that year, he played on the band's cover of the Beatles' "Come Together", which appeared on an EP called Loudest Love. Everman appeared in Soundgarden's Louder Than Live home video. Everman was not viewed as a good fit with the band due to his personality and he was fired by Soundgarden in 1990 because of interpersonal conflicts, particularly with Chris Cornell.

Everman left immediately after Soundgarden completed its promotional tour for Louder Than Love in mid-1990 and began to play bass for the band OLD (Old Lady Drivers), at which time Soundgarden found Yamamoto's ultimate successor, bassist Ben Shepherd.

Later, in 1993, he played guitar in the band Mind Funk.

== Later life ==
In September 1994, influenced by Renaissance icon Benvenuto Cellini (who stated that a well-rounded man is an artist, warrior and philosopher), he left Mind Funk to enlist in the United States Army, subsequently serving with the Army's 2nd Ranger Battalion, Delta Company and later with the Special Forces, serving tours in Afghanistan and Iraq. After completing his service, he took a break from the military and lived in New York City where he briefly worked as a bike messenger. He then traveled to Tibet and worked and studied in a Buddhist monastery before returning to the U.S. He reentered the Army when offered the chance to join Special Forces.

After receiving an honorable discharge in 2006, Everman went on to earn a Bachelor of Arts in philosophy from Columbia University School of General Studies on May 20, 2013. General Stanley A. McChrystal wrote a letter of recommendation for his application. In September 2010, Everman conducted an interview with Music Life Radio detailing his life. He also briefly appears in a 2010 documentary about Motörhead frontman Lemmy where he described Motorhead as "Good go-to-war music."

In July 2013, The New York Times published a portrait on Everman, written by guitarist and writer Clay Tarver. The article features interviews with Everman, his family members, former band colleagues, music industry people, and soldiers. A 2014 The Daily Beast interview mentions that Everman was invited to attend Nirvana's Rock and Roll Hall of Fame induction, that he lives in New York, has participated in writing workshops and "still goes overseas regularly, working as a consultant for the military."

Everman earned a Master's in Military History from Norwich University in 2017.

In May 2017, Everman met fellow veteran Brad Thomas in New York and the two decided to start a band named Silence & Light. By July, the band had a complete lineup consisting of military veterans with Everman playing the guitar. They began recording an album in January 2019 in Van Nuys, California. The band released a complete album in December 2019. The band's profits are dedicated to helping members of the Special Operations Community, the Military, and First Responders. The band said they consider their genre to be modern rock.

In April 2023, Everman appeared as a guest on the Joe Rogan Experience to talk about his life and career.

== Discography ==
With Nirvana

- Bleach (1989) (Credited but does not play)
- Hard to Believe: A Kiss Covers Compilation (1990) rhythm guitar on track 11
- With the Lights Out (2004) 2nd guitar on track 17 (disc one) and track 10 (DVD)

With Soundgarden

- Loudest Love (1990) (track 5)
- Louder Than Live (1990)

With OLD

- Lo Flux Tube (1991)
- Masters of Misery – Black Sabbath: An Earache Tribute (1992)

With Mind Funk

- Dropped (1993)

With Silence & Light

- Volume One (2019)
- Coulda, Shoulda, Woulda… (2023)

== Awards and decorations ==
Everman's awards include the following:

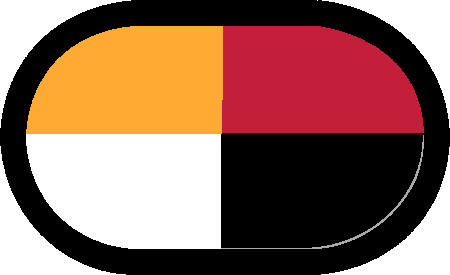
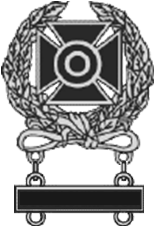

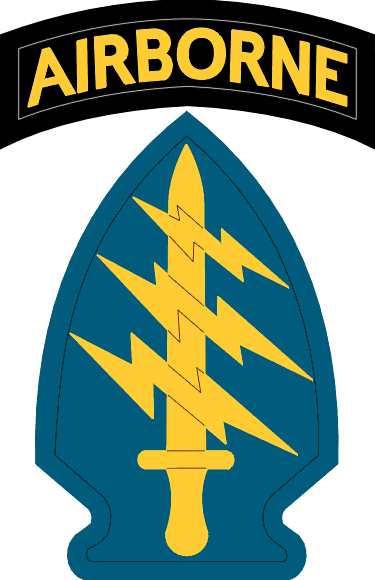

Combat Infantryman Badge
Army Good Conduct Medal, 4 awards		National Defense Service Medal
Afghanistan Campaign Medal with 1 bronze star	Iraq Campaign Medal with 1 bronze star	Global War on Terrorism Expeditionary Medal
Global War on Terrorism Service Medal	Army Service Ribbon	Army Overseas Service Ribbon
U.S. Army Special Forces Distinctive unit insignia	Master Parachutist Badge with 3rd Special Forces Group background trimming	Expert Marksmanship badge with rifle component bar
Special Forces Tab	United States Army Special Forces Combat Service Identification Badge	Ranger tab

4 Overseas Service Bars
4 Service stripes

== See also ==
- List of pre-fame band departures
