= The Hucklebuck =

Jazz and R&B dance tune

"The Huckle-Buck"
- 1949 78 label

Single by Paul Williams and His Hucklebuckers
- B-side: "Hoppin' John"
- Released: January 1949
- Recorded: December 15, 1948
- Label: Savoy 683
- Songwriter: Andy Gibson
- Producer: Teddy Reig

"The Hucklebuck" (sometimes written "The Huckle-Buck") is a jazz and R&B dance tune first popularized by Paul Williams and His Hucklebuckers in 1949. The composition of the tune was credited to Andy Gibson, and lyrics were later added by Roy Alfred. The song became a crossover hit and a dance craze, in many ways foreshadowing the popular success of rock and roll a few years later. It was successfully recorded by many other musicians including Lucky Millinder, Roy Milton, Tommy Dorsey, Frank Sinatra, Lionel Hampton, Louis Armstrong, Chubby Checker, Bo Diddley, Otis Redding, Quincy Jones, Canned Heat, Coast to Coast, Brendan Bowyer and Crystal Swing.

== Original recordings ==
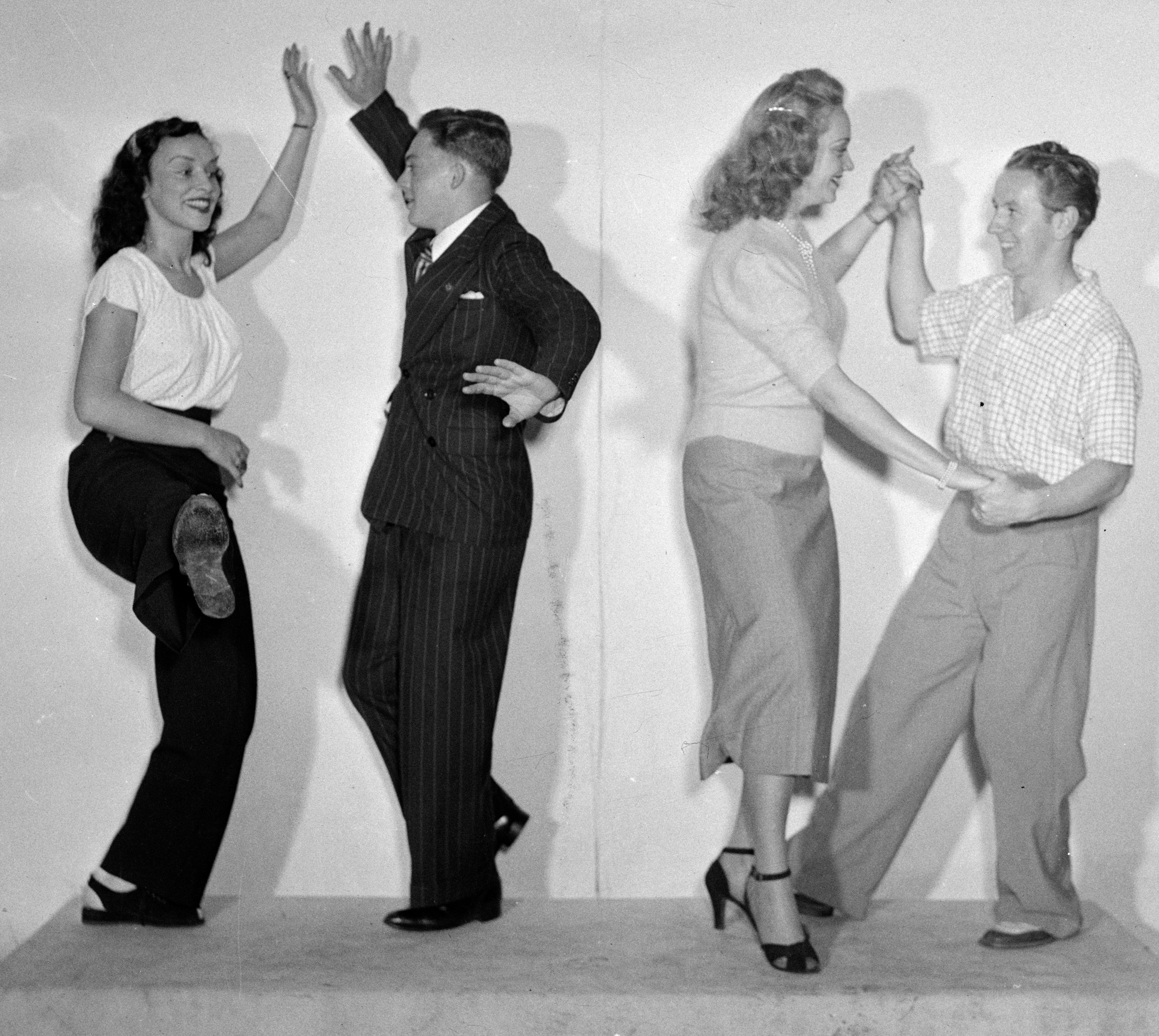
Hucklebuck dancers, Sydney, April 1950

The tune, structured around a twelve-bar blues progression, was originally recorded by Paul Williams and his band, credited as His Hucklebuckers, in New York City, on December 15, 1948, with producer Teddy Reig. The composition was credited to Andy Gibson, and the recording was released by Savoy Records. The personnel on the session were Phil Guilbeau (trumpet), Miller Sam (tenor saxophone), Paul Williams (baritone and alto saxophone), Floyd Taylor (piano), Herman Hopkins (bass), and Reetham Mallett (drums).

Williams had first heard the tune when it was played by Lucky Millinder and his band at a rehearsal earlier that year for a concert, either in Newark or Baltimore, at which both bands performed. The tune had originally been written by Gibson for Millinder, as "D'Natural Blues" (unrelated to the similarly-titled 1928 Fletcher Henderson tune), and Millinder and his band recorded it with that title, in January 1949, for RCA Records. The tune itself was strongly influenced by "Now's the Time", a composition by Charlie Parker who first recorded it in 1945, also produced by Reig for the Savoy label, with a band that included Dizzy Gillespie, Miles Davis, and Max Roach. Millinder later took court action against Gibson and United Music, the publishing company, for copyright infringement, but eventually dropped the case while retaining the rights to "D'Natural Blues".

After Williams began performing Gibson's composition, he noticed that, at a show in Devon, Pennsylvania, audience members were performing a new dance, called the Hucklebuck, to it. Williams renamed the song as "The Huckle-Buck", and his recording rapidly rose to the top of the R&B chart. It reached the #1 spot in March 1949, staying in that position for 14 weeks, and spending a total of 32 weeks on the chart. It reportedly sold half a million copies, and broke sales records. Williams' concerts became increasingly riotous; Reig claimed that he taught Williams to perform vigorously, "kicking as he played, bending and dipping, getting down on the floor while blowing that saxophone." Though Williams had already had several R&B hits, "The Huckle-Buck" established his popularity, and he was billed as Paul "Hucklebuck" Williams for the remainder of his career. Millinder's recording of "D'Natural Blues", also an instrumental, reached #4 on the R&B chart, staying on the chart for 12 weeks.

== Vocal recordings ==
"The Hucklebuck"

Single by Chubby Checker

from the album Twist with Chubby Checker
- B-side: "Whole Lotta Shakin' Goin' On"
- Released: October 1960
- Label: Parkway 813
- Songwriter: Andy Gibson
- Producer: Kal Mann

The success of Williams' instrumental recording led to words being written to the tune, by Tin Pan Alley lyricist Roy Alfred. The lines included: "Wiggle like a snake/ Waddle like a duck/ That's the way you do it/ When you do the Hucklebuck." The first vocal version was by Roy Milton, whose recording on the Specialty record label entered the R&B chart in April 1949, rising to #5. A version by the Tommy Dorsey Orchestra, with vocals by Charlie Shavers, entered the Billboard pop chart in May 1949, also rising to #5, and later the same year Frank Sinatra's recording reached #10 on the pop chart. Recordings were also made in 1949 by Tito Burns, Lionel Hampton, and Pearl Bailey with Hot Lips Page.

The song was later covered by many other musicians – it has been said that "no standard has been covered in as many different styles as the Hucklebuck." As well as jazz and pop versions, there have been blues versions by Earl Hooker, Canned Heat, and others, and recordings in styles such as rockabilly, easy listening, soul, ska, Latin, punk, and R&B. The 1960 recording by Chubby Checker reached #14 on the US pop chart and co-charted with the b-side at #2 in Canada. In Ireland, the Royal Showband featuring Brendan Bowyer had a #1 hit with the song in 1965, and the band Coast to Coast had a #5 pop hit in Britain with it in 1981.

== Dance craze ==
The Hucklebuck became a wildly successful dance craze in 1949, partly due to its sexual connotations. LeRoi Jones reported that people danced at rent parties in Newark, night after night "until they dropped." The basic dance has been described as having "a double point with the feet to the side on each side (four counts) then a lift and twist of the leg and a small kick, then a shimmy, hip gyration... The dance could get very sexual in nature when done as a couple dance with the male dancing behind the female, one hand on her waist or hip and the other on her shoulder, gyrating the hips in unison or with shocking variations such as when the female dancers would lie down on their backs and the male dancers would stand over the center of her, slowly doing hip gyrations, hip rolling, wiggling dance movements, slowly working their way over and past the female's head."
