= Carol Deene =

British singer and radio host (born 1944)

- Birth name: Carole Carver
- Born: 3 August 1944 (age 81) Thurnscoe, West Riding of Yorkshire, England
- Genres: Pop
- Occupation(s): Singer, radio host, radio station manager
- Instrument: Vocals
- Years active: 1960s–1970s
- Labels: His Master's Voice; Columbia; CBS; Conquest; Pye; Koala; Rim

Carol Deene (born Carole Carver; 3 August 1944) is an English pop singer and radio host who achieved success in the early 1960s.

== Biography ==
=== Early career ===
After appearing on Joan Regan's BBC TV programme Be My Guest in 1961, at the age of 16, Deene was signed to the His Master's Voice label. She scored her first chart hit in late 1961, and three Top 40 hits on the UK Singles Chart in 1962.

=== Recordings ===
Deene's first hit was "Sad Movies (Make Me Cry)", a number 44 entry on the UK chart in October 1961. The song was a cover of a US hit written by John D. Loudermilk and originally performed by pop/country singer Sue Thompson; this was a formula repeated for Deene's second hit, "Norman", which reached number 24 in January 1962.

In a different mould, Deene covered Joanie Somers' US chart hit "Johnny Get Angry" for her third single, and saw it reach number 32 in July that year. Deene's fourth single, "Some People" (the title theme of the film of the same name) hit number 25 in August. Her fifth single reverted to the pattern of her first two, being a cover of a US hit written by John D. Loudermilk and originally performed by Sue Thompson: "James (Hold The Ladder Steady)" reached number 29 and 39 on the NME and Melody Maker charts respectively, although it missed the Record Retailer chart (which has since become the listing used by the Official Charts Company). In 1962, Deene briefly hosted her own show on Radio Luxembourg.

She achieved no further hits after 1962, but despite a serious car accident in 1966, Deene continued to record throughout the 1960s and into 1970, regularly touring the northern clubs. After another car crash in 1974, she recorded only sporadically for a number of labels until the late 1970s. It was later reported that Deene lived in Spain, where she was managing a radio station with her husband.

In January 1997, Diamond Records released a compilation album of Deene's work, entitled Johnny Get Angry. It featured all her recordings for His Master's Voice and Columbia.

== Single discography ==
Year	Record catalogue number	Title	B-side	UK Singles Chart
1961	His Master's Voice POP922	"Sad Movies (Make Me Cry)"	"Don't Forget"	44
1962	His Master's Voice POP973	"Norman"	"On The Outside Looking In"	24
1962	His Master's Voice POP1027	"Johnny Get Angry"	"Somebody's Smiling (While I'm Crying)"	32
1962	His Master's Voice POP1058	"Some People"	"Kissin'"	25
1962	His Master's Voice POP1086	"James (Hold The Ladder Steady)"	"It Happened Last Night"	-
1963	His Master's Voice POP1123	"Growin' Up"	"Let Me Do It My Way"	-
1963	His Master's Voice POP1200	"I Want To Stay Here"	"Oh Oh Oh Willie"	-
1964	His Master's Voice POP1275	"Who's Been Sleeping in My Bed?"	"Love is Wonderful"	-
1964	His Master's Voice POP1337	"Hard To Say Goodnight"	"The Very First Kiss"	-
1965	His Master's Voice POP1405	"Most People Do"	"I Can't Forget Someone Like You"	-
1965	Columbia DB7743	"He Just Don't Know"	"Up in the Penthouse"	-
1966	Columbia DB7890	"Dancing in Your Eyes"	"Please Don't Be Unfaithful Again"	-
1967	Columbia DB8107	"Love Not Have I"	"Time"	-
1968	CBS 3206	"When He Wants A Woman"	"I'm Not Crying"	-
1969	Conquest CXT102	"One More Chance"	"Invisible Tears"	-
1970	Pye Records 7N45008	"A Windmill in Old Amsterdam"	"Little Mr. Baggy Breeches"	-
1979	Koala Records KOA 101	"Angel in Your Arms"	"Oh Babe"	-
1979	Koala Records KOA 102	"Nativity Song"	"The Sun Ain't Gonna Shine"	-
1979	RIM Records RIM 003	"Ready for the Times To Get Better"	"It's So Easy"	-
