= Mexico (instrumental) =

Single by Bob Moore & His Orchestra

from the album Mexico
- A-side: "Mexico"
- B-side: "Hot Spot"
- Released: 1961
- Recorded: 1960
- Genre: Pop, country
- Length: 2:37
- Label: Monument
- Songwriter: Boudleaux Bryant

"Mexico" is the title of a 1961 instrumental recording by American bassist, orchestra leader, and Rockabilly Hall of Fame member Bob Moore. The song was written by Boudleaux Bryant. Moore was a noted session musician in the 1950s and 1960s who worked with Elvis Presley, Pat Boone, Roy Orbison, and Brenda Lee, among others.

== Chart performance ==
The song "Mexico" is credited to Bob Moore and His Orchestra, and in the fall of 1961 it became the only single where Moore is listed as an artist to reach the Top 40 of the U.S. Billboard Hot 100 chart. The song peaked at #7 and spent ten weeks in the Top 40. Moreover, it reached #1 on the Easy Listening chart, remaining at the top for one week in October 1961. It reached #22 on the R&B chart. Outside the U.S., "Mexico" was a #1 hit in both Australia and Germany, and it sold over two million records worldwide.

== Cover versions ==
- Herb Alpert & the Tijuana Brass, on The Lonely Bull in 1962.
- The Ventures, on their 1963 album The Ventures Play Telstar and the Lonely Bull, BST 8019.
- Dick Dale and his Del-Tones, on their 1963 album King of the Surf Guitar. Dale recorded another version on his 1994 album Unknown Territory.

== See also ==
- List of number-one adult contemporary singles of 1961 (U.S.)
- List of number-one singles in Australia during the 1960s
- Number-one hits of 1962 (Germany)
