= Nine Little Teardrops =

Single by Sue Thompson
- A-side: "Sad Movies (Make Me Cry)"
- Released: July 1961
- Genre: Pop, easy listening
- Length: 1.58
- Label: Hickory
- Songwriter(s): Ramsey Kearney

"Nine Little Teardrops" is a popular song composed by Ramsey Kearney and performed by Sue Thompson in 1961. It was released as the reverse side of Hickory 45 rpm record "Sad Movies (Make Me Cry)". It was covered by Vilma Santos.
