= Norman (song) =

1961 single by Sue Thompson

Single by Sue Thompson

from the album Meet Sue Thompson
- B-side: "Never Love Again"
- Released: December 1961
- Genre: Pop
- Length: 2:16
- Label: Hickory
- Songwriter: John D. Loudermilk

Sue Thompson singles chronology
"Sad Movies (Make Me Cry)" (1961)	"Norman" (1961)	"Two of a Kind" (1962)

"Norman" is a popular song written by John D. Loudermilk. Recorded by Sue Thompson in 1961, the song reached No. 3 on the Billboard Hot 100. The next year, Carol Deene released her version of the song in the United Kingdom on His Master's Voice, where it reached No. 24 on the UK Singles Chart. A cover version by British singer Carol Deene (who also had a hit in the UK with her version of Thompson's “Sad Movies (Make Me Cry)” the previous year) would be a hit in the UK in early 1962.

== Chart performance ==
Chart (1961–1962)	Peak position
Argentina Escalera a la Fama	8
Australian Kent Music Report	4
Belgian Ultratop	4
Canada CHUM Chart	3
Dutch Single Top 100	2
German Musikmarkt	14
New Zealand (Lever Hit Parade)	1
South Africa	1
US Billboard Hot 100	3

== Carol Deene version ==
"Norman"

Single by Carol Deene
- B-side: "On The Outside Looking In"
- Released: January 1962
- Recorded: Late 1961
- Genre: Pop
- Length: 2:20
- Label: His Master's Voice
- Songwriter: John D. Loudermilk

Carol Deene singles chronology
"Sad Movies (Make Me Cry)" (1961)	"Norman" (1962)	"Johnny Get Angry" (1962)

In 1962, the song was covered by British singer Carol Deene (who had also had a hit with a cover of Thompson's Sad Movies (Make Me Cry) the previous year) and was released as a single that January. Deene's version peaked at Number 24 on the UK singles chart around the same time and would be Deene's second of the four hits in her musical career.

=== Chart performance ===
Chart (1963)	Peak position
UK Singles Chart	24
