= List of Billboard Easy Listening number ones of 1961 =

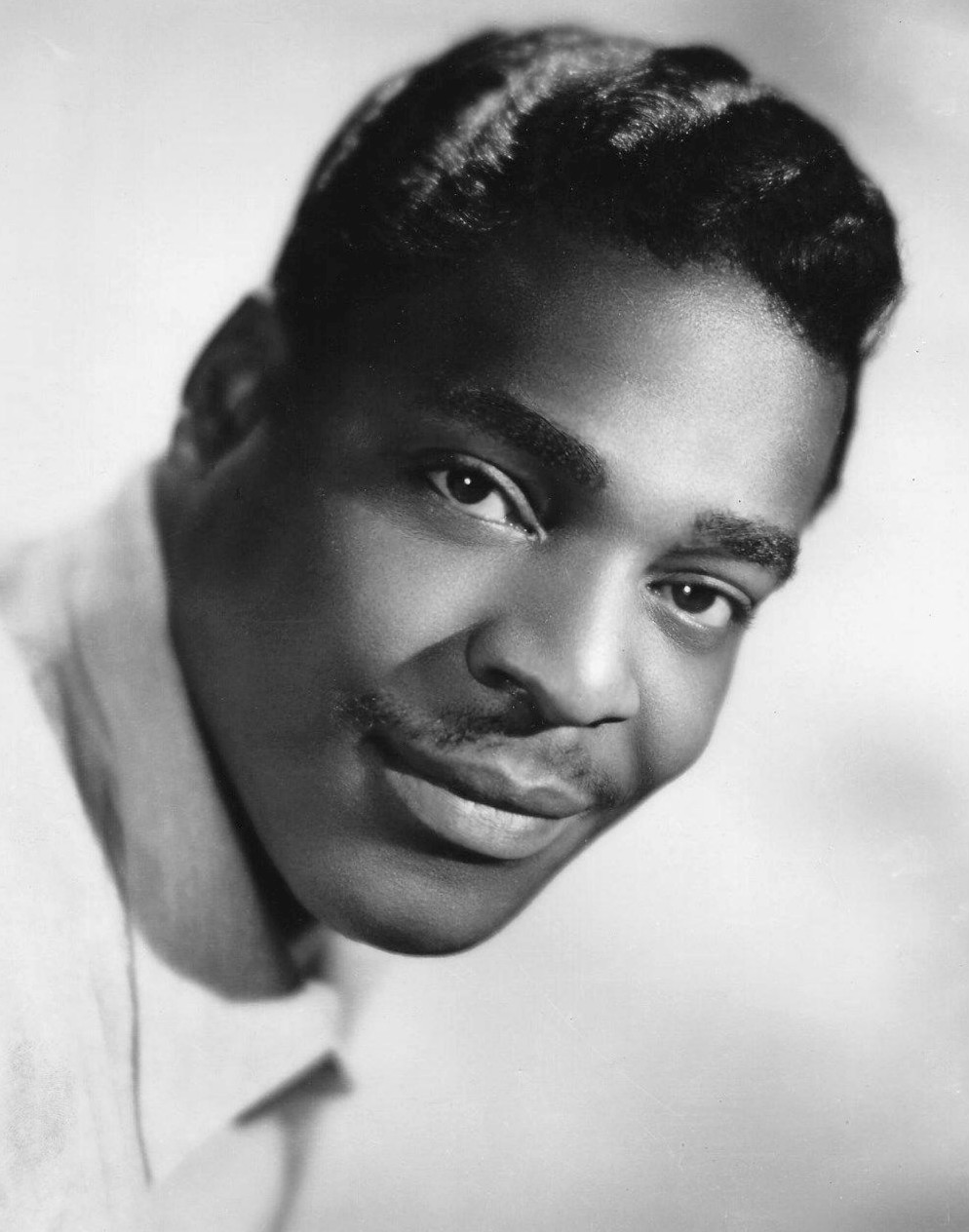
Brook Benton had the first number one on the Easy Listening chart.

In 1961, Billboard magazine launched a chart ranking the top-performing songs in the United States which were considered to be "easy listening". The chart has undergone various name changes and since 1996 has been published under the title Adult Contemporary. Initially, the listing was compiled simply by extracting from the magazine's pop music chart, the Hot 100, those songs which were deemed by the magazine's staff to fit under the Easy Listening banner and ranking them according to their placings on the Hot 100. In 1961, seven different songs topped the Easy Listening chart in 24 issues of the magazine.

The number one song on the first Easy Listening chart was "The Boll Weevil Song" by Brook Benton, which was at number 2 on the Hot 100 that week. Benton had achieved six chart-toppers on the R&B chart since 1959, but "The Boll Weevil Song" would prove to be his only Easy Listening number one. The song held the top spot on the new chart for three weeks before being replaced by "Together" by Connie Francis.

The longest-running Easy Listening number one of 1961 was "Big Bad John" by Jimmy Dean, which spent the final ten weeks of the year in the top spot. The song was a multi-genre chart-topper, also reaching number one on the country chart as well as the Hot 100. It was one of three songs to top the Hot 100 as well as the Easy Listening chart during the year, along with "Wooden Heart" by Joe Dowell and "Michael" by the Highwaymen. "Mexico" by Bob Moore and his Orchestra, which topped the Easy Listening chart for a single week, would prove to be the only track by Moore to appear on either that listing or the Hot 100. Moore, whose primary instrument was the bass guitar, was better known as a backing musician for other artists, including Elvis Presley and Bob Dylan.

== Chart history ==
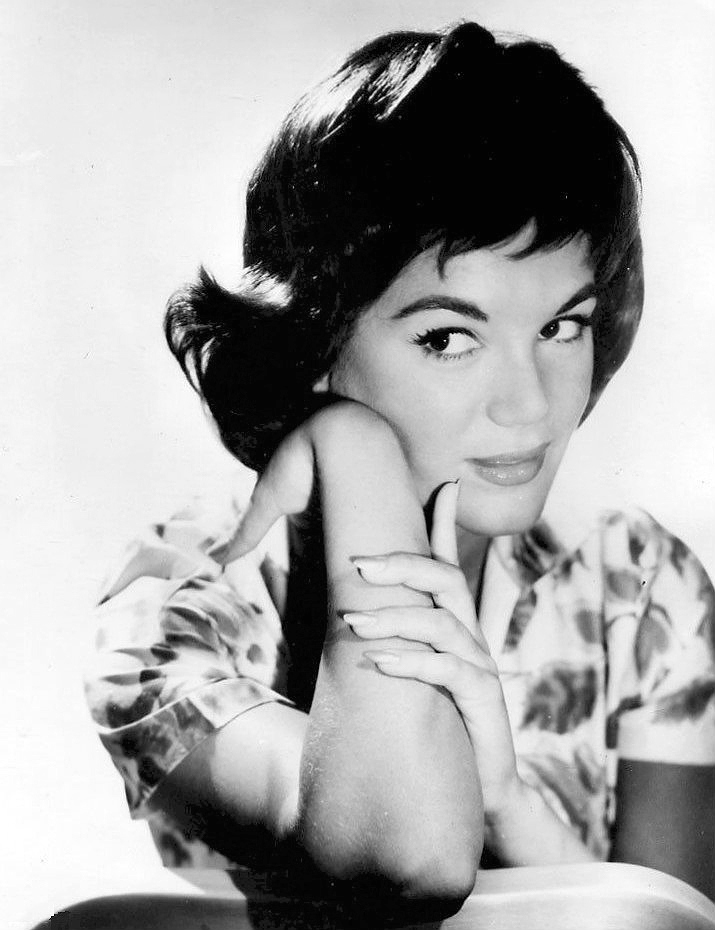
Connie Francis topped the chart with her recording of the 1928 song "Together".

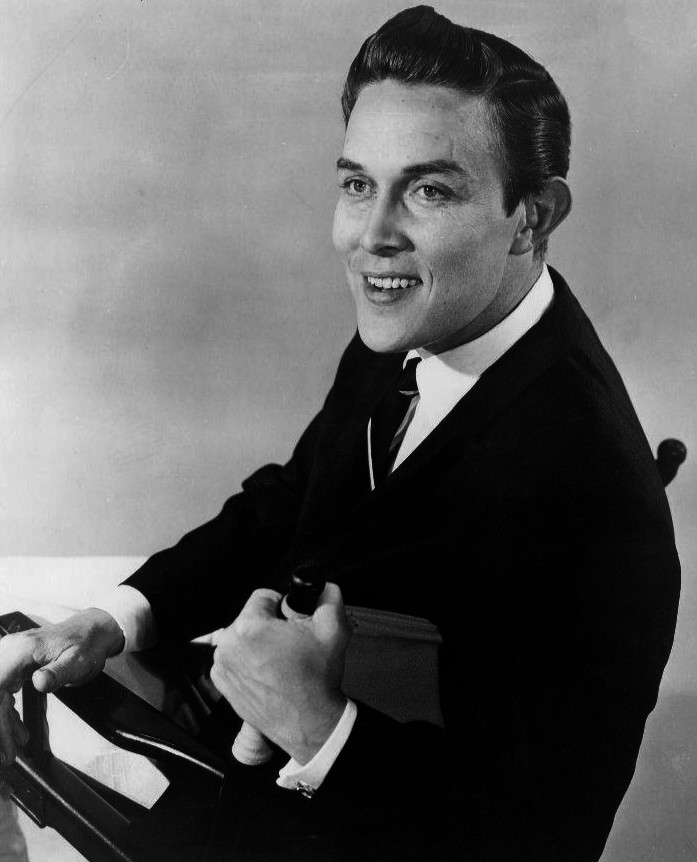
Jimmy Dean spent the last ten weeks of 1961 at number one.

Chart history
Issue date	Title	Artist(s)	Ref.
July 17	"The Boll Weevil Song"	Brook Benton	
July 24	"The Boll Weevil Song"	Brook Benton	
July 31	"The Boll Weevil Song"	Brook Benton	
August 7	"Together"	Connie Francis	
August 14	"Wooden Heart"	Joe Dowell	
August 21	"Wooden Heart"	Joe Dowell	
August 28	"Wooden Heart"	Joe Dowell	
September 4	"Michael"	The Highwaymen	
September 11	"Michael"	The Highwaymen	
September 18	"Michael"	The Highwaymen	
September 25	"Michael"	The Highwaymen	
October 2	"Michael"	The Highwaymen	
October 9	"Mexico"	Bob Moore and his orchestra	
October 16	"Sad Movies (Make Me Cry)"	Sue Thompson	
October 23	"Big Bad John"	Jimmy Dean	
October 30	"Big Bad John"	Jimmy Dean	
November 6	"Big Bad John"	Jimmy Dean	
November 13	"Big Bad John"	Jimmy Dean	
November 20	"Big Bad John"	Jimmy Dean	
November 27	"Big Bad John"	Jimmy Dean	
December 4	"Big Bad John"	Jimmy Dean	
December 11	"Big Bad John"	Jimmy Dean	
December 18	"Big Bad John"	Jimmy Dean	
December 25	"Big Bad John"	Jimmy Dean	

== See also ==
- 1961 in music
- List of artists who reached number one on the U.S. Adult Contemporary chart
