= Checkered Flag (album) =

Studio album by Dick Dale
- Released: 1963
- Recorded: September 1963
- Genre: Hot rod rock
- Label: Capitol
- Producer: Jim Economides, Jim Monsour

Dick Dale chronology
King of the Surf Guitar (1963)	Checkered Flag (1963)	Mr. Eliminator (1964)

Professional ratings
Review scores
Source	Rating
AllMusic	3/5 stars

Checkered Flag is the third studio album by Dick Dale and his Del-Tones, released in 1963. This was Dale's first entry into hot rod rock, which the Beach Boys, among others, were beginning to perform and record. Here, the style shifts somewhat and features slightly altered beats and some added sounds to give the impression of the energy of Hot-rodding (this is not always the case though). Dale's next album Mr. Eliminator is a follow-up to this, featuring more hot rod songs.

== Chart performance ==
The album debuted on Billboard magazine's Top LP's chart in the issue dated December 14, 1963, peaking at No. 106 during an eleven-week run on the chart.

== Track listing ==
All tracks composed by Dick Dale; except where indicated.

1. "The Scavenger" (Gary S. Paxton, Paul Nuckles) – 1:54
2. "Surf Buggy" – 2:07
3. "Hot Rod Racer" (Eddie Daniels, Jerry Capehart) – 2:19
4. "Mag Wheels" (Gary Usher, Richard Burns) – 1:58
5. "Big Black Cad" (Gary Usher, Roger Christian) – 1:40
6. "Ho-Dad Machine" – 2:06
7. "Grudge Run" (Gary Paxton, Paul Nuckles) – 3:05
8. "Motion" – 1:44
9. "426–Super Stock" (Gary Usher, Roger Christian) – 1:52
10. "The Wedge" – 2:01
11. "It Will Grow on You" (Carol Connors, Marshall Howard Connors) – 1:33
12. "Night Rider" – 1:47

== Personnel ==
- Guitar: Dick Dale, Art Munson
- Bass: Bryan Dietz
- Piano: Billy Barber, Lincoln Mayorga
- Drums: Hal Blaine, Frank DeVito, Earl Palmer
- Saxophone: Steve Douglas, Jim Horn, Plas Johnson
