= Home Truths =

- Running time: 60 mins
- Country of origin: United Kingdom
- Language: English
- Home station: BBC Radio 4
- Hosted by: John Peel
- Original release: 11 April 1998 – 24 June 2006
- Opening theme: "Let's Go Trippin'" by Dick Dale and The Del-Tones
- Website: Website

Home Truths is a weekly BBC Radio 4 programme which began on 11 April 1998 and was usually hosted by the DJ John Peel until his death in October 2004. In the Saturday 9–10 am slot, it gradually became one of Radio 4's most successful programmes.

Home Truths was a talk show in which the host would interview ordinary people with an extraordinary story to tell. There was also considerable correspondence with its listeners. Home Truths was based on a previous show called Offspring (which aired from 1995 to 1997), also hosted by Peel. Home Truths took essentially the same format as its predecessor but widened the remit from talking about the relationship between parents and children to discussion of all aspects of life. As well as Peel's down-the-line interviews, every programme also included one or two eight-to-ten-minute recorded on-the-scene crafted features made by several free-lance radio journalists. Ray Kershaw, for example, created over 50 of these features from the earliest episodes in1998 to the final programme in 2006. The extraordinary stories of ordinary people in their own words constituted a kind of British social history of the first decade of the 21st Century. A book, Home Truths – The Peel Years and Beyond, with an edited selection of stories, appeared in 2006.

After Peel's death, the programme was presented by a series of guest presenters including Paul Heiney, writer David Stafford, comedian Linda Smith and musician Tom Robinson. However, the programme was axed after the BBC decided that the formula did not work as well without Peel's presence.

The last edition of Home Truths was presented by David Stafford and was broadcast on 24 June 2006. The slot was taken over the same year by Saturday Live.

The series theme tune was Dick Dale's Let's Go Trippin'.
