= Surfers' Choice =

Surfers’ Choice

Studio album by Dick Dale and His Del-Tones
- Released: November 1962
- Recorded: Rendezvous Ballroom in Balboa Beach, California
- Genre: Instrumental rock, surf music
- Label: Deltone
- Producer: Jim Monsour

Dick Dale and His Del-Tones chronology
Surfers’ Choice (1962)	King of the Surf Guitar (1963)

Professional ratings
Review scores
Source	Rating
AllMusic	4.5/5 stars

Surfers’ Choice is the debut studio album of Dick Dale and his Del-Tones, pioneers in the surf genre. The album was released in November 1962. The recording established the conventions of surf music and brought the concept to middle America. The album was mostly recorded live at the Rendezvous Ballroom, with overdubs added in the studio. The record was out of print for a long time. It was reissued on CD by Sundazed Music in October 2006. The album was rereleased by Not Now Music with a bonus disc of singles as Surf Beat.

== Track listing ==
All tracks composed by Dick Dale; except where indicated

Side one

1. "Surf Beat"
2. "Sloop John B" (Carl Sandburg, Lee Hays)
3. "Take It Off"
4. "Night Owl" (Tony Allen)
5. "Fanny Mae" (Buster Brown)
6. "Misirlou Twist" (Chaim Tauber, Fred Wise, Milton Leeds, Nicholas Roubanis)

Side two

7. "Peppermint Man" (Alonzo Willis)
8. "Surfing Drums"
9. "Shake 'n' Stomp"
10. "Lovey Dovey" (Eddie Curtis, Ahmet Ertegun)
11. "Death of a Gremmie"
12. "Let's Go Trippin'"

=== 2006 Sundazed CD bonus tracks ===
13. "Del-Tone Rock"
14. "Jungle Fever" (a later version of "Surfing Drums" with jungle noises added)
15. "Misirlou" (traditional)
16. "Eight Till Midnight"
17. "Lovin' on My Brain"
18. "A Run For Life"

=== 2013 Not Now Music bonus disc ===
1. "Ooh-Whee Marie"
2. "Stop Teasin'"
3. "St. Louis Blues"
4. "Jessie Pearl"
5. "We'll Never Hear the End of It"
6. "The Fairest of Them All"
7. "Del-Tone Rock"
8. "Let's Go Trippin'"
9. "Shake 'N' Stomp"
10. "Jungle Fever"
11. "Misirlou"
12. "Eight 'Til Midnight"
13. "Peppermint Man"
14. "Surf Man"

== Chart positions ==
Billboard Music Charts – Album

- 1963 Pop Albums No. 59

Billboard Music Charts – Single

- 1962 “Let’s Go Trippin’” Pop Singles No. 60
