= On the Flip Side =

1966 television musical

On the Flip Side is an hour-long television musical with music by Burt Bacharach, lyrics by Hal David, and a book by Robert Emmett. The story concerns rock 'n' roll star Carlos O'Conner, whose career is on the skids after early success at age 20. He tries to make a comeback, but his style is out of date. He prays for a miracle, and gets one, when Angie and the Celestials, four angels, join his act.

On the Flip Side was made for the anthology series ABC Stage 67, and it was originally broadcast on ABC television on December 7, 1966. It was the first musical written by Bacharach and David, who later co-created the 1968 Broadway musical Promises, Promises. The production was directed by Joe Layton and starred Rick Nelson as O'Conner and Joanie Summers as Angie, with Tyrone Cooper, Steven Perry, and Jeff Siggins as the Celestials, Will Mackenzie as Jerome, Donna Jean Young as Juanita, Murray Roman as Hairy Eddie Popkin and James Coco as Zuckerman. Peter Matz served as the arranger and conducted the orchestra.

== Original cast album ==
On the Flip Side – Original Cast Album

Soundtrack album by Rick Nelson, Joanie Sommers
- Released: 1966
- Genre: Cast recording
- Length: 26:12
- Label: Decca
- Producer: Charles "Bud" Dant

Rick Nelson chronology
Bright Lights and Country Music (1966)	On the Flip Side – Original Cast Album (1966)	Country Fever (1967)

Joanie Sommers chronology
Come Alive! (1966)	On The Flip Side – Original Cast Album (1966)	Dream - Live At The Backlot Studio (1983)

An original cast album of On the Flip Side was released in December 1966 with Rick Nelson and Joanie Sommers. It was released on the Decca Records label. Bear Family included the album in the 2008 Rick Nelson's For You: The Decca Years box set.

=== Reception ===
Professional ratings
Review scores
Source	Rating
The Encyclopedia of Popular Music	1/5 stars

Billboard selected as a "Special Merit Pick" and gave particular praise to the arrangements by Peter Matz, Nelson's performance on the song "They Don't Give Medals", and Sommers' vocals on the song "Try to See It My Way".

Cashbox said, "The album should be popular with the TV'er's viewers and those hearing the music for the first time."

=== Track listing ===
==== Side one ====
No.	Title	Performer(s)	Length
1.	"It Doesn't Matter Anymore"	Rick Nelson	2:19
2.	"Fender Mender"	Joanie Sommers, & The Celestials	2:27
3.	"They Don't Give Medals (To Yesterday's Heroes)"	Rick Nelson	2:02
4.	"Try to See It My Way"	Joanie Sommers	2:29
5.	"Juanita's Place Montage"	Peter Matz Orchestra	4:50

==== Side two ====
No.	Title	Performer(s)	Length
1.	"Take a Broken Heart"	Rick Nelson	2:39
2.	"They're Gonna Love It"	Donna Jean Young	2:06
3.	"Try to See It My Way"	Rick Nelson & Joanie Sommers	2:28
4.	"Juanita's Place"	The Celestials	2:12
5.	"They Don't Give Medals (To Yesterday's Heroes)"	Peter Matz Orchestra	2:49
