= Calling Up Spirits =

Studio album by Dick Dale
- Released: 1996
- Recorded: 1996
- Studio: Prairie Sun (Cotati, California)
- Genre: Surf music
- Length: 53:41
- Label: Beggars Banquet
- Producer: Dick Dale, Ron Eglit, Scott Mathews, Prairie Prince, Allen Suddeth

Dick Dale chronology
Unknown Territory (1994)	Calling Up Spirits (1996)	Spacial Disorientation (2001)

Calling Up Spirits is an album by the surf guitarist Dick Dale, released in 1996. It was dedicated to the American Indians.

Dale supported the album by playing the 1996 Warped Tour.

== Production ==
The album contains a cover of Jimi Hendrix's "Third Stone from the Sun". Vince Welnick contributed to Calling Up Spirits. Ron Eglit, Dale's longtime bass player, received a producer credit.

== Critical reception ==
Professional ratings
Review scores
Source	Rating
AllMusic	1.5/5 stars
Calgary Herald	3.5/5 stars
The Encyclopedia of Popular Music	2/5 stars
Entertainment Weekly	B
(The New) Rolling Stone Album Guide	3/5 stars

Entertainment Weekly wrote that the "mix of covers, remakes of [Dale's] '60s surf hits, and ecologically minded new material feels thin and lacks the cohesiveness of previous efforts." The Vancouver Sun stated: "Playing speedy as ever, Dale returns to the land he founded: a mix of eastern-tinged influences (his dad was Lebanese) rolled up in surf wax and thrown into the wide-open waves." The Calgary Herald concluded: "From his raunchy title track and the bongo-beat hipness of 'Fever' to his twang reworking of Jimi Hendrix's 'Third Stone From The Sun', he embodies rock guitar cool."

AllMusic wrote that "Dale only manages to capture his manic energy on the cover version of Jimi Hendrix' 'Third Stone From the Sun'."

== Track listing ==
All tracks composed by Dick Dale, except where indicated

1. "Nitrus" – 3:29
2. "The Wedge Paradiso" – 2:37
3. "The Pit" – 2:38
4. "Fever" (J. Davenport, E. Dooley) – 4:46
5. "Doom Box" – 3:04
6. "Catamount" – 3:05
7. "Window" – 4:22
8. "Calling Up Spirits" – 3:50
9. "Temple of Gizeh" – 6:16
10. "Bandito" – 5:32
11. "Third Stone from the Sun" (Jimi Hendrix) – 6:32
12. "Peppermint Man" (A. Willis) – 4:11
13. "Gypsy Fire" – 3:13

== Personnel ==
- Dick Dale – guitar, trumpet, vocals
- Ron Eglit – bass guitar, background vocals
- Prairie Prince – drums, percussion, background vocals
- Scott Mathews – drums, percussion, background vocals

Additional musicians

- Vincent Welnick – organ, piano, background vocals
- Bobby Stricklan – didgeridoo, background vocals
- Jill Dale – drums, background vocals
- Ko Mathews – background vocals

Recorded January 1996 at Prairie Sun Recording Studios, Cotati, California.
