= The Highwaymen (folk band) =

American folk band

The Highwaymen were an American 1960s "collegiate folk" group. The quintet's version of "Michael, Row the Boat Ashore", a 19th-century African-American work song, released in 1959 under the title "Michael", was a Billboard number-one hit in September 1961. The group scored another top-20 hit in 1962 with a version of Lead Belly's "Cotton Fields". "Michael" sold over one million copies, achieving gold record status. The group originated at Wesleyan University in Middletown, Connecticut, where its members were undergraduates.

== Career ==
As a freshman at Wesleyan University in 1958, Dave Fisher, who in high school had sung in a doo-wop group called the Academics, joined with four other freshmen – Bob Burnett, Steve Butts, Chan Daniels, and Steve Trott – to form the Highwaymen. Originally, they called themselves the Clansmen because they liked Irish and Scottish music, but they abandoned that name at the advice of their manager Ken Greengrass, and chose "the Highwaymen" inspired by a poem by English poet Alfred Noyes. Fisher, who would graduate in 1962 with the university's first degree in ethnomusicology, was the quintet's arranger and lead singer. Among the folk songs Fisher arranged for the Highwaymen was an African-American spiritual or work song "Michael, Row the Boat Ashore", which had been rediscovered in an 1867 collection of slave songs by Boston songfinder and teacher Tony Saletan in 1954, and released on LP in 1957 by both the Weavers and Bob Gibson. In September 1960, United Artists released a recording of the Highwaymen's version under the abbreviated title of "Michael", which slowly gained popularity and eventually reached number one on the Billboard Hot 100 chart during the week of 4–11 September 1961, earning the quintet a gold record. The single also reached number one in the UK and number four in Germany.

Later members were Gil Robbins (father of actor Tim Robbins), who joined in 1962 when Steve Trott entered law school, and in 1991, guitarist/bassist Johann Helton.

The original group stopped performing in 1964 and the members, while remaining in touch, went their separate professional ways. One attended Harvard Business School, two attended Harvard Law School, and one attended graduate school at Columbia University, then proceeded into business, law, and academia. Fisher alone stayed in the music business, and with him as musical director, the "Highwaymen" continued with Renny Temple, Roy Connors, Mose Henry, and Alan Scharf. They recorded two albums, Stop! Look! & Listen and On a New Road, and performed concerts and appeared on many television variety shows. Temple, Connors, and Henry were previously in a popular Florida folk group called the Vikings Three. Alan Scharf had an earlier career as an actor, which continued after the Fisher-led group disbanded.

In 1967, Dave Fisher moved to Hollywood, where he composed and arranged music for films and television and worked as a studio singer and musician. He wrote more than 1000 songs, many of which have been used in movie and television productions. After serving in the Army Reserve, Burnett graduated from Harvard Law School in 1967 and "went on to a long career in law and banking." Chan Daniels studied acting for several years in New York and Hollywood and later graduated from Harvard Business School and became an executive for Capitol Records. Steve Butts received a PhD in Chinese politics from Columbia, and until retirement served as an academic administrator at the University of Wisconsin-Madison, Grinnell College, and Lawrence University. He also taught baroque music performance at the Lawrence University Conservatory of Music and statistics at Columbia. Steve Trott, after graduating from Harvard Law, became a prosecutor in the Los Angeles County District Attorney's office. Later, he served as associate attorney general, the number-two position in the United States Department of Justice during the Presidency of Ronald Reagan and in 1987 was appointed a judge of the United States Court of Appeals for the Ninth Circuit.

The original Highwaymen, minus Daniels (who died in 1975), reunited in 1987 for a concert for their 25th college reunion. From that time until the death of Dave Fisher in 2010, the original band recorded several albums and performed a dozen or so concerts a year. Their studio album from this period, The Water of Life: A Celtic Collection (2004), was recorded and engineered by their bassist Johann Helton at JoTown Records in Boise, Idaho. Two additional CDs, in concert format, The Highwaymen in Concert, and When the Village Was Green, were released in 2002 and 2007, respectively.

In 1990, the members of the original group sued country music's Highwaymen, made up of Willie Nelson, Waylon Jennings, Johnny Cash, and Kris Kristofferson, over their use of the name, which was inspired by a Jimmy Webb ballad they had recorded. The suit was dropped when all parties agreed that the folk group owned the name and that the folk group would grant the nonexclusive, nontransferable license to the supergroup to use the name. The two groups then shared the stage at a 1990 concert at the Universal Amphitheater in Hollywood.

The original group last performed in August 2009 at the Guthrie Center in Massachusetts. The rock-and-roll magazine Blitz described the Highwaymen's record of their 1963 concert at Massachusetts Institute of Technology as the best compilation or reissue of 2009. Blitz also named the band's album When the Village Was Green one of the best releases of 2007.

Daniels died of pneumonia on August 2, 1975, at the age of 36. Fisher died of myelofibrosis on May 7, 2010, at the age of 69. Burnett died of brain cancer on December 7, 2011, at his home in Riverside, Rhode Island. He was 71. As of December 2011, just two of the five original members were still alive: Steve Trott and Steve Butts.

== Legacy ==
The Highwaymen had a significant impact on the folk scene of the early 1960s. Aside from two major hit singles and several appearances on The Ed Sullivan Show and The Tonight Show Starring Johnny Carson, the group contributed two future standards to the folk repertoire, "All My Trials" and "Big Rock Candy Mountain", and played the central role in uncovering "Cotton Fields", a long-overlooked song by Lead Belly, which subsequently became a major addition to the repertoires of both the Beach Boys and Creedence Clearwater Revival. The Highwaymen also made the first recording of "Universal Soldier" by Buffy Sainte-Marie.

== Original members ==
- Dave Fisher (July 19, 1940 – May 7, 2010)
- Bob Burnett (February 7, 1940, Providence, Rhode Island – December 7, 2011)
- Steve Butts
- Chan Daniels (died August 2, 1975, aged 36)
- Stephen S. Trott, December 12, 1939, Glen Ridge, New Jersey)

== Additional members ==
- Gil Robbins (born Gilbert Lee Robbins, April 3, 1931, Spokane, Washington – April 5, 2011). He is the father of actor Tim Robbins.

== Discography ==
=== Albums ===
- The Highwaymen (1960)
- Standing Room Only! (1961)
- Encore (1962)
- March On Brothers (1963)
- Hootenanny with the Highwaymen (1963)
- Homecoming (1963)
- The Spirit and the Flesh (1964)
- One More Time (1964)
- In Concert (2002)
- The Water of Life (2004)
- When the Village Was Green (2007)

=== Singles ===
Year	Single (A-side, B-side) Both sides from same album except where indicated	Chart positions				Album
Year	Single (A-side, B-side) Both sides from same album except where indicated	US	US AC	CAN	UK	Album
1960	"Michael"	1	1	2	1	The Highwaymen
1960	"The Gypsy Rover"	42	12	3	41	Standing Room Only!
1960	"Cotton Fields"	13	3	3		Standing Room Only!
1962	"I'm on My Way" b/w "Whiskey in the Jar"	90				Encore
1962	"The Bird Man" b/w "Cindy, Oh Cindy" (from The Highwaymen)	64	19			Non-album track
1962	"I Know Where I'm Going" b/w "Well, Well, Well"					March On Brothers
1963	"I Will Never Marry" b/w "Pretoria"					March On Brothers
1963	"All My Trials" b/w "Midnight Train" (from One More Time!)					Non-album track
1963	"Universal Soldier" b/w "I'll Fly Away" (from March On Brothers)					One More Time!
1963	"Roll On, Columbia, Roll On" b/w "The Tale of Michael Flynn"					Hootenanny with the Highwaymen
1964	"The Sinking of the Reuben James" b/w "Bon Soir"					Homecoming
1964	"Sweet Mama Tree Top Tall" b/w "Nellie"					Non-album tracks
1964	"Michael Row the Boat Ashore '65" b/w "Puttin' on the Style"					Non-album tracks
1965	"Should I Go, Should I Stay" b/w "Permit to Be a Hermit"					On a New Road
1965	"I'll Show You the Way" b/w "Never a Thought for Tomorrow"					On a New Road
1966	"Little Bird, Little Bird" b/w "She's Not There"					Non-album tracks
1966	"My Foolish Pride" b/w "Flame"					Non-album tracks
