= Let's Go Trippin' =

Single by Dick Dale and The Del-Tones

from the album Surfers' Choice
- Released: September 1961
- Recorded: 1961
- Genre: Surf rock
- Length: 2:10
- Label: Deltone
- Songwriter(s): Dick Dale
- Producer(s): Jim Monsour

Dick Dale and The Del-Tones singles chronology
"Ooh-Wee Marie" (1961)	"Let's Go Trippin'" (1961)	"Jungle Fever" (1962)

Audio sample
- file; help

"Let's Go Trippin'" is an instrumental by Dick Dale and The Del-Tones. It is often regarded as the first surf rock instrumental and is credited for launching the surf music craze. First played in public in 1960 at the Rendezvous Ballroom in Balboa Peninsula, Newport Beach, California, it reached number 4 on the Los Angeles station KFWB, and later peaked at number 60 on the Billboard Hot 100.

The song was used as the theme tune to the BBC Radio 4 programme Home Truths, originally presented by John Peel.

== Bibliography ==
- All Music Guide to Rock: The Definitive Guide to Rock, Pop, and Soul, Backbeat Records, 2002, ISBN 978-0879306533
