= Unknown Territory (Dick Dale album) =

Studio album by Dick Dale
- Released: 1994
- Recorded: 1994
- Studios: Prairie Sun Recording Studios, Cotati, California
- Genre: Surf music
- Length: 51:49
- Label: HighTone
- Producers: Scott Mathews, Dick Dale

Dick Dale chronology
Tribal Thunder (1993)	Unknown Territory (1994)	Calling Up Spirits (1996)

Unknown Territory is a studio album by the American surf guitarist Dick Dale, released in 1994. Dale supported the album with a North American tour. The cover of "Ring of Fire" was a tribute to Dale's childhood love of country music.

== Critical reception ==
Professional ratings
Review scores
Source	Rating
AllMusic	4/5 stars
Chicago Tribune	3/4 stars
The Encyclopedia of Popular Music	3/5 stars
Los Angeles Times	2.5/4 stars

The Chicago Tribune wrote that "the extravagance of [Dale's] embroiderings suggesting jazz even as the savagery of his attack is rock incarnate." The Los Angeles Times opined that "the album's prime stuff is defined less by speed than by its sexy swagger ... 'F Groove' offers slow, heavy rock that is truly low-down and mean." The News Tribune determined that "Hava Nagila" "sounds like the Ramones picked up a B'nai Brith songbook."

== Track listing ==
All tracks composed by Dick Dale, except where indicated.

1. "Scalped" – 4:05
2. "Mexico" (Boudleaux Bryant) – 3:05
3. "F Groove" – 4:26
4. "Terra Dicktyl" – 3:11
5. "Take It or Leave It" – 4:27
6. "Ghost Riders in the Sky" (Stan Jones) – 3:16
7. "Fish Taco" – 2:39
8. "California Sun" (Henry Glover) – 3:16
9. "Maria Elena" – 4:19
10. "Hava Nagila" (traditional) – 4:00
11. "The Beast" – 3:09
12. "Unknown Territory" – 7:55
13. "Ring of Fire" (Merle Kilgore, June Carter) – 3:31

== Personnel ==
Musicians

- Dick Dale – guitar, vocals
- Ron Eglit – bass guitar, 6 string bass
- Scott Mathews – drums, percussion
- Prairie Prince – drums, percussion
- Tribe Vibe (Scott Mathews, Dick Dale, Prairie Prince, Morgan Raimond, Joe Marquez) – chants
- Huey Lewis – harmonica on "Ghost Riders in the Sky" and "F Groove"

Technical personnel

- Allen Sudduth – engineering, mixing
- Shawn Michael Morris, Joe Marquez – assistant engineers
- Marc Senasac – mastering (Rocket Lab, San Francisco)
