= Dude Martin =

- Born: John Stephen McSwain; March 11, 1915
- Died: February 11, 1991 (aged 75)
- Genres: Western swing
- Occupations: Singer, bandleader, radio and television host
- Instruments: Vocals, guitar
- Labels: RCA Victor, Mercury
- Spouse: Sue Thompson

John Stephen McSwain (March 11, 1915 – February 11, 1991), better known by his stage name Dude Martin, was an American country singer and bandleader, radio and early television personality.

== Career ==
In the 1930 and 1940s, Dude Martin and His Roundup Gang were regulars on radio stations in the San Francisco Bay Area.

He notably hosted KGO radio shows called Cowboy Review and Sunrise Roundup and then, with the advent of television, moved to KGO-TV as well.

He recorded for labels such as RCA Victor and Mercury.

== Personal life ==
He married singer Sue Thompson, who performed and recorded with his band Dude Martin and His Roundup Gang.

== Accolades ==
In 2008, he was inducted into the Bay Area Radio Hall of Fame.
