= Mr. Eliminator =

Studio album by Dick Dale and his Del-Tones
- Released: 1964
- Recorded: January 1964
- Genre: Hot rod rock
- Label: Capitol
- Producer: Jim Economides, Jim Monsour (exec.producers), Dick Dale (producer)

Dick Dale and his Del-Tones chronology
Checkered Flag (1963)	Mr. Eliminator (1964)	Summer Surf (1964)

Professional ratings
Review scores
Source	Rating
Allmusic	3.5/5 stars

Mr. Eliminator is the fourth studio album by Dick Dale (and his Del-Tones), released in 1964 as a loose conceptual successor to the previous album Checkered Flag. This album consists mostly of hot-rod or racing themes, whether simply in the names, or in the slight alteration of beats and accompaniment as well, as was seen in the Checkered Flag album. Dale is widely known and famous for incorporating heavy middle-eastern influence into his recordings, and some may argue that "The Victor", a track on the album, as being probably the heaviest in influence. This album was Dale's last venture into the hot-rod style, and with his next album (and last studio album with the Del-Tones), Summer Surf, he would return to surf music.

== Track listing ==
All tracks composed by Dick Dale; except where indicated

1. "Mr. Eliminator"
2. "50 Miles to Go" (Kenny Young)
3. "Flashing Eyes"
4. "Taco Wagon"
5. "The Squirrel" (Carol Connors, Steve Barri)
6. "The Victor"
7. "Blond in the 406" (Carol Connors, Steve Barri, Steven Gorman)
8. "Firing Up"
9. "My X-KE" (Carol Connors, Steve Barri, Steven Gorman)
10. "Nitro Fuel"
11. "Hot Rod Alley" (Guy Hemric, Jerry Styner)
12. "Wild Ideas" (CD reissue extra track)
13. "Wild, Wild Mustang" (CD reissue extra track)

== Personnel ==
- Dick Dale – guitar
- Glen Campbell – guitar
- Gary Usher – vocals
- Plas Johnson – sax
- Jerry Cole – guitar
- Bruce Johnston – keyboards
- Earl Palmer – drums

== Influence & legacy ==
The title track was covered by The Smithereens and released as a bonus track on the CD reissue of their debut album, Especially for You.
