= Sad Movies (Make Me Cry) =

1961 single by Sue Thompson

Single by Sue Thompson

from the album Meet Sue Thompson
- B-side: "Nine Little Teardrops"
- Released: July 1961
- Genre: Pop
- Length: 3:15
- Label: Hickory
- Songwriter: John D. Loudermilk
- Producer: Wesley Rose

Sue Thompson singles chronology
"Sad Movies (Make Me Cry)" (1961)	"Norman" (1962)

"Sad Movies (Make Me Cry)" is a 1961 pop song by the American singer Sue Thompson. The song was written by John D. Loudermilk and was released as Thompson's debut single, from her Hickory Records debut album Meet Sue Thompson. The song also spawned multiple successful cover versions.

== Background ==
Although Thompson was in her thirties when she recorded "Sad Movies", her singing style and young-sounding voice appealed to many of the Baby Boomers whose influence was starting to become apparent on the US music charts. Loudermilk was inspired to write the song after a girlfriend of his went to see the 1960 film Spartacus: "After the movie went off, they turned the bright lights on, and it was just an ambience killer. The person I was with had tears in her eyes and said, 'Sad movies make me cry'."

== Chart performance ==
Released as a single in 1961, "Sad Movies (Make Me Cry)" was Thompson's first song to appear on the Billboard Hot 100 chart, where it peaked at number five in October. The song also reached the top of the Billboard Easy Listening chart, which had been created earlier in 1961, and was the second song by a female vocalist to top the list. In Australia, the song topped out at number six on the Kent Music Report, in Canada it reached number 30 co-charting with The Lennon Sisters, while in the United Kingdom, it peaked at number 46 on the UK Singles Chart. The Song peaked at No. 5 on the New Zealand lever hit parade charts

== Notable cover versions ==
"Sad Movies (Make Me Cry)"

Single by The Lennon Sisters

from the album Sad Movies Make Me Cry
- B-side: "I Don't Know Why"
- Released: August 1961
- Genre: Pop
- Length: 2:40
- Label: Dot
- Songwriter: John D. Loudermilk
- Producers: George Cates; Lawrence Welk; Randy Wood

The Lennon Sisters singles chronology
"Repeat After Me" (1960)	"Sad Movies (Make Me Cry)" (1961)	"Kaw - Liga" (1961)

"Sad Movies (Make Me Cry)"

Single by Carol Deene
- B-side: "Don't forget"
- Released: September 22, 1961
- Genre: Pop
- Length: 2:50
- Label: His Master's Voice
- Songwriter: John D. Loudermilk

Carol Deene singles chronology
"Sad Movies (Make Me Cry)" (1961)	"Norman" (1962)

"Quand le film est triste"

Single by Sylvie Vartan

from the album Sylvie
- Language: French
- English title: When the film is sad
- B-side: "Tout Au Long Du Calendrier"
- Released: November 1961
- Recorded: Fall 1961
- Genre: Pop
- Length: 3:02
- Label: RCA Victor
- Songwriters: John D. Loudermilk, Georges Aber, Lucien Morisse

Sylvie Vartan singles chronology
"Panne d'essence" (1961)	"Quand le film est triste" (1961)	"Est-ce que tu le sais?" (1962)

Notable cover versions of the song include:

- In November 1961, French pop singer Sylvie Vartan recorded the song in French as "Quand le film est triste" ("When the film is sad"). The song peaked at Number 29 on the French Belgian charts, and was featured on her debut album Sylvie a year later.
- The Lennon Sisters also recorded a version of "Sad Movies" in August 1961 for their album of the same name which peaked at number 56 on the Billboard Hot 100 and number 13 on the Easy Listening chart.
- British pop singer and radio presenter Carol Deene released a version in September 1961 as her debut single, which charted at number 44 on the UK Singles Chart.

In Brazil, the song was recorded by the trio Trio Esperança in 1963, with the name Filme Triste, translated by Romeo Nunes . It was released as single

== See also ==
- List of Top 25 singles for 1961 in Australia
- List of number-one adult contemporary singles of 1961 (U.S.)
