= King of the Surf Guitar =

Studio album by Dick Dale and His Del-Tones
- Released: June 1963
- Recorded: March – April 1963
- Genre: Instrumental rock, surf music, rock and roll
- Length: 30:38
- Label: Capitol
- Producer: Jim Monsour, Voyle Gilmore

Dick Dale and His Del-Tones chronology
Surfers' Choice (1962)	King of the Surf Guitar (1963)	Checkered Flag (1963)

Professional ratings
Review scores
Source	Rating
AllMusic	4/5 stars
New Record Mirror	4/5 stars

King of the Surf Guitar is the second studio album of surf music by Dick Dale, released in 1963, featuring original and cover songs.

== Track listing ==
1. "King of the Surf Guitar" (Alonzo Willis) – 2:06
2. "The Lonesome Road" (Nathaniel Shilkret, Gene Austin) – 3:14
3. "Kansas City" (Jerry Leiber, Mike Stoller) – 2:43
4. "Dick Dale Stomp" (Dick Dale) – 2:12
5. "What'd I Say" (Ray Charles) – 3:24
6. "Greenback Dollar" (Hoyt Axton, Ken Ramsey) – 2:52
7. "Hava Nagila" – 2:04
8. "You Are My Sunshine" (Jimmie Davis, Charles Mitchell) – 1:58
9. "Mexico" (Boudleaux Bryant) – 2:10
10. "Break Time" (Dick Dale) – 2:45
11. "Riders in the Sky" (Stan Jones) – 2:11
12. "If I Never Get to Heaven" (Jenny Lou Carson, Roy Botkin) – 2:55

== Personnel ==
- Dick Dale – lead guitar
- Art Munson – guitar
- Rene Hall – guitar
- Glen Campbell – guitar
- Barney Kessel – guitar
- Nick O'Malley – guitar
- Ray Sambra – bass
- Bryan Dietz – bass
- Leon Russell – piano
- Bill Barber – piano
- Hal Blaine – drums
- Jack Lake – drums
- Jerry Stevens – drums
- Jerry Brown – saxophone
- Lee Farrell – saxophone
- Larry Gillette – saxophone
- Risdon Gwartney – saxophone
- Barry Rillera – saxophone
- Armon Frank – saxophone
- The Blossoms – background vocals
