= Gil Robbins =

American musician and actor (1931–2011)

- Born: Gilbert Lee Robbins; April 3, 1931; Spokane, Washington, U.S.
- Died: April 5, 2011 (aged 80); Esteban Cantu, Baja California, Mexico
- Occupations: Folk musician, actor, vocal coach
- Spouse: Mary Bledsoe Robbins
- Children: 4, including Tim

Gilbert Lee Robbins (April 3, 1931 – April 5, 2011) was an American folk singer, folk musician and actor. Robbins was a former member of the folk band, the Highwaymen. The New York Times described Robbins as a "fixture on the folk-music scene." He was the father of actor and director Tim Robbins.

== Early life ==
Robbins was born in Spokane, Washington, in 1931, the son of Agnes J. (née Hughes) and Richard Lee Robbins. He moved with his family to Los Angeles, California, when he was less than one year old. Robbins began playing with the percussion section of the Long Beach Symphony Orchestra as a high school student. He received a scholarship to attend the University of California, Los Angeles (UCLA), where he joined the university's marching band as a drum major. He met his future wife, Mary Bledsoe, then a collegiate flautist, as a student at UCLA. Robbins left UCLA before his graduation and enlisted in the United States Air Force in 1951. During his time in the U.S. Air Force, Robbins became a conductor and drum major for the 542nd Division at an Craig Air Force Base, in Selma, Alabama.

== Career ==
Robbins played with several bands and musicians early in his career. he became a member of the trio Cumberland Three in 1960. The band had been formed by musician John Stewart and Roulette Records, who sent them to New York City. Robbins soon became active in the city's folk music scenes, especially in Greenwich Village. Robbins recorded three albums with the Cumberland Three, including two albums of American Civil War music. Robbins left the Cumberland Three after three albums and joined the Belafonte Singers, a twelve-member group which performed with Harry Belafonte. He also performed with Tom Paxton.

Robbins joined the folk band, The Highwaymen in 1962, replacing departing member Stephen Trott, who left the band to attend Harvard Law School. He remained as a member of the band for three years until its breakup in 1964. Robbins, who appeared on five of the band's albums, performed for the band as a guitarrón mexicano player, songwriter and baritone singer. His live album credits with the band included Hootenanny With the Highwaymen, One More Time and Homecoming. Robbins has been credited with influencing some of The Highwaymen more politically oriented music during his membership.

Robbins became the manager of The Gaslight Cafe, a former folk music club in New York City's Greenwich Village, during the late 1960s. The club saw performances by well known musicians early in their careers, including Bob Dylan, Bonnie Raitt and Bruce Springsteen. Robbins also became active within other sectors of the Greenwich Village community, including as the choir director of the Church of St. Joseph in Greenwich Village. He also founded the Occasional Singers, a choral group which performed "avant garde" music, according to the New York Times.

Outside of music, Robbins also pursued a career in acting. He worked as a stage actor in New York City, including off Broadway productions and musicals. He was also cast in several small films roles, including Bob Roberts in 1992, Dead Man Walking in 1995, the 1999 dramatic film, Cradle Will Rock, and the 1998 M. Night Shyamalan film, Wide Awake. Additionally, Robbins worked as a musical consultant and vocal coach.

== Death ==
Gil Robbins died at his home in Esteban Cantu, Baja California, Mexico from prostate cancer on April 5, 2011, aged 80. He was survived by his wife Mary Robbins (who died 12 days later, aged 78).
