= Tribal Thunder =

Studio album by Dick Dale
- Released: May 1993
- Studio: Brilliant Studios, San Francisco, California; Studio D, Sausalito, California
- Genre: Surf music
- Length: 45:35
- Label: HighTone
- Producer: Scott Mathews, Joel Selvin, Dick Dale

Dick Dale chronology
Summer Surf (1964)	Tribal Thunder (1993)	Unknown Territory (1994)

Professional ratings
Review scores
Source	Rating
AllMusic	4.5/5 stars
Los Angeles Times	3.5/4 stars

Tribal Thunder is an album by surf guitarist Dick Dale, released in 1993. It was his first album of new material in almost three decades.

== Track listing ==
All tracks composed by Dick Dale; except where indicated

1. "Nitro" – 3:19
2. "The New Victor" – 2:48
3. "Esperanza" – 3:52
4. "Shredded Heat" – 2:45
5. "Trail of Tears" – 4:52
6. "Caravan" (Duke Ellington, Juan Tizol)– 4:47
7. "The Eliminator" – 2:25
8. "Speardance" – 5:37
9. "Hot Links: Caterpillar Crawl/Rumble" (Joel Scott Hill, Ron Lynch/Link Wray, Mark Grant)– 5:59
10. "The Long Ride" – 3:57
11. "Tribal Thunder" – 6:21
12. "Misirlou" (acoustic version, unlabeled on CD) – 2:29

== Personnel ==
Musicians

- Dick Dale – guitar, vocals
- Ron Eglit – bass guitar on "Nitro", "Esperanza", "Trail of Tears", "Caravan", "Speardance", "Hot Links" and "The Long Ride"
- Rowland Salley – bass guitar on "The New Victor", "Shredded Heat", "The Eliminator" and "Tribal Thunder"
- Scott Mathews – drums, percussion
- Prairie Prince – drums, percussion
- The Tribe (Scott, Prairie, Kolleen, Dick, Jill and Forrest) – chants

Technical personnel

- Joel Jaffe – engineering (Studio D)
- Allen Sudduth, Rob Baldwin, Wolf Kessler – engineering (Brilliant Studios)
- Allen Sudduth – mixing (Brilliant Studios)
- Paul Stubblebine – mastering (Rocket Lab, San Francisco)
