= Summer Surf =

Studio album by Dick Dale and His Del-Tones
- Released: 1964
- Recorded: 1964
- Genre: Surf music
- Label: Capitol
- Producer: Dick Dale, Jim Monsour, Jim Economides

Dick Dale and His Del-Tones chronology
| Mr. Eliminator (1964) | Summer Surf (1964) | Tribal Thunder (1993) |

Professional ratings
Review scores
| Source | Rating |
|---|---|
| Allmusic | 3.5/5 stars |

Summer Surf is the fifth studio album of surf music by Dick Dale and His Del-Tones. Dale wrote three of the tracks on the album, with Beach Boys' session musician Steve Douglas writing another three. The rest are culled from various writers that were not necessarily writing in the classic surf style. For example, the track titled "Glory Wave," written in the style of a spiritual, was originally written for the 1964 beach party film, Surf Party, where it was performed by Jackie DeShannon. This was the last album Dick Dale recorded with the Del-Tones due to his battle with rectal cancer, and the last album he would record until 1986.

== Track listing ==
1. "Summer Surf" (Steve Douglas)
2. "Feel So Good" (Chuck Willis)
3. "Surfin'" (Jerry Leiber, Mike Stoller)
4. "Spanish Kiss" (Dick Dale)
5. "The Star (of David)" (Don P. Mason)
6. "Banzai Washout" (Douglas)
7. "Glory Wave" (Jimmie Haskell, William Dunham)
8. "Surfin' Rebel" (Douglas)
9. "Never On Sunday" (Billy Towne, Manos Hadjidakis)
10. "Mama's Gone Surfin'" (Carol Connors, Harvey Bruce, Steve Barri)
11. "Tidal Wave" (Dale)
12. "Thunder Wave" (Dale)
13. "Who Can He Be" (Douglas Salamanca)
14. "Oh Marie" (Eduardo di Capua, Vincenzo Russo)

== Personnel ==
- Guitar: James Burton, Jerry Cole, Dick Dale, Neil LeVang
- Bass: Steve LaFever
- Keyboards: Gene Garf, Leon Russell
- Drums: Hal Blaine, Edward Hall, Earl Palmer
- Percussion: Emil Richards
- Saxophone: Steve Douglas, Plas Johnson, Jay Migliori
- Trombone: Gail Martin
- Trumpet: Dick Dale

== Bibliography ==
- McParland, Stephen J. (1994). It's Party Time - A Musical Appreciation of the Beach Party Film Genre. USA: PTB Productions. pp. 39. ISBN 0-9601880-2-9
