= Dick Dale =

American surf rock guitarist (1937–2019)

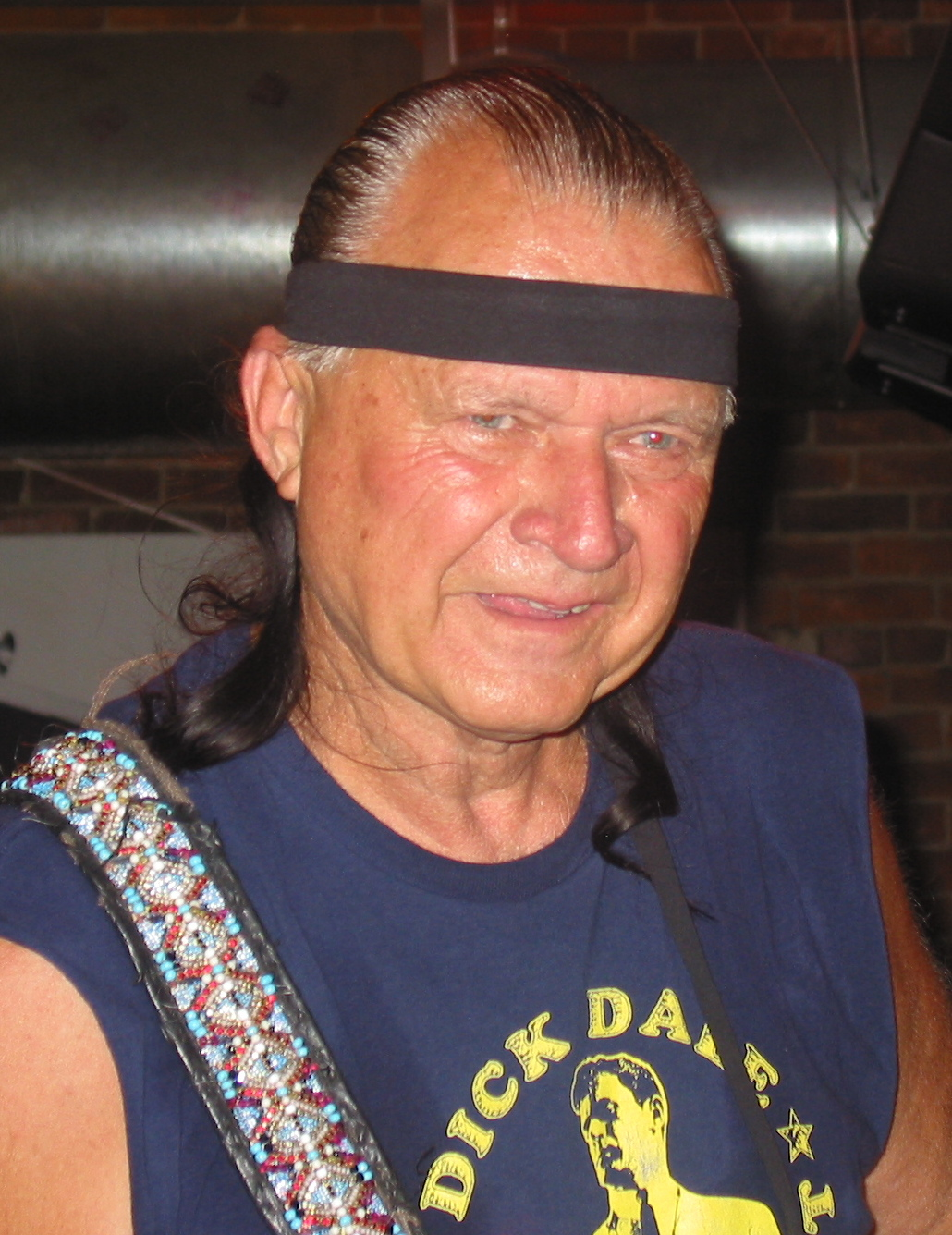
- Dale in 2006

Background information
- Also known as: The King of the Surf Guitar
- Born: Richard Anthony Monsour; May 4, 1937; Boston, Massachusetts, U.S.
- Died: March 16, 2019 (aged 81) Loma Linda, California, U.S.
- Genres: Surf; rockabilly; proto-punk; proto-metal; instrumental rock; rock and roll
- Occupation: Musician
- Instrument: Guitar
- Years active: 1955–2019
- Labels: Capitol; GNP Crescendo; Deltone

Richard Anthony Monsour (May 4, 1937 – March 16, 2019), known professionally as Dick Dale, was an American rock guitarist. He was a pioneer of surf music, drawing on Middle Eastern music scales and experimenting with reverb. Dale was known as "The King of the Surf Guitar," which was also the title of his second studio album.

Dale was one of the most influential guitarists of all time and especially of the early 1960s. Most of the leading bands in surf music, such as the Beach Boys, Jan and Dean and the Trashmen, were influenced by Dale's music, and often included recordings of Dale's songs in their albums. His style and music influenced guitarists such as Jimi Hendrix, Pete Townshend, Eddie Van Halen and Brian May.

He has been credited with popularizing tremolo picking on electric guitar, a technique that is now widely used in many musical genres (such as extreme metal, jazz fusion, etc.). His speedy single-note staccato picking technique was unrivaled until guitarists like Eddie Van Halen entered the music scene.

He is cited as one of the fathers of heavy metal for pushing the limits of amplification. Working together with Leo Fender, Dale helped to develop new equipment that was capable of producing thick and previously unheard volumes including the first-ever 100-watt guitar amplifier. Dale also pioneered the use of portable reverb effects.

The use of his recording of "Misirlou" by Quentin Tarantino in the film Pulp Fiction led to his return in the 1990s, marked by four albums and world tours. He was also nominated for a Grammy in the Best Rock Instrumental Performance category for the song "Pipeline" with Stevie Ray Vaughan. In "Rolling Stone's 100 Greatest Guitarists of All Time," Dale was ranked 31st in 2003 and 74th in the 2011 revision.

== Early life ==
Dick Dale was born Richard Anthony Monsour in Boston, Massachusetts, on May 4, 1937. He was of Lebanese descent from his father, James (Arabic: جيمس منصور), and of Polish-Belarusian descent from his mother, Sophia "Fern" (née Danksewicz). His family subsequently moved to Quincy, Massachusetts, which at the time had a significant Lebanese population in the neighborhood of Quincy Point. He learned the piano when he was nine after listening to his aunt playing it. He was given a trumpet in seventh grade, and later acquired a ukulele (for $6 part exchange), after having become influenced by Hank Williams. The first song he played on the ukulele was "Tennessee Waltz." He was also influenced musically by his uncle, who taught him how to play the tarabaki and could play the oud.

Dale then bought a guitar from a friend for $8, paying him back in installments. He learned to play the instrument, using both lead and rhythm styles, so that the guitar filled the place of drums. His early tarabaki drumming later influenced his guitar playing, particularly his rapid alternate picking technique. Dale referred to this as "the pulsation" and said his way of playing any instrument derived from his tarabaki style. He was raised in Quincy until he completed the eleventh grade at Quincy High School in 1954, when his father, a machinist, took a job working for Hughes Aircraft Company in the Southern California aerospace industry. The family moved to El Segundo, California. Dale spent his senior year at and graduated from Washington Senior High School. He learned to surf at the age of 17. As a Lebanese-American, he retained a strong interest in Arabic music, which later played a major role in his development of surf music.

== Career ==
=== 1960s ===
Dale began playing in local country western–rockabilly bars, where in 1955 he met an entertainer who went by Texas Tiny, who gave him the name "Dick Dale" because he thought it was a good name for a country singer.

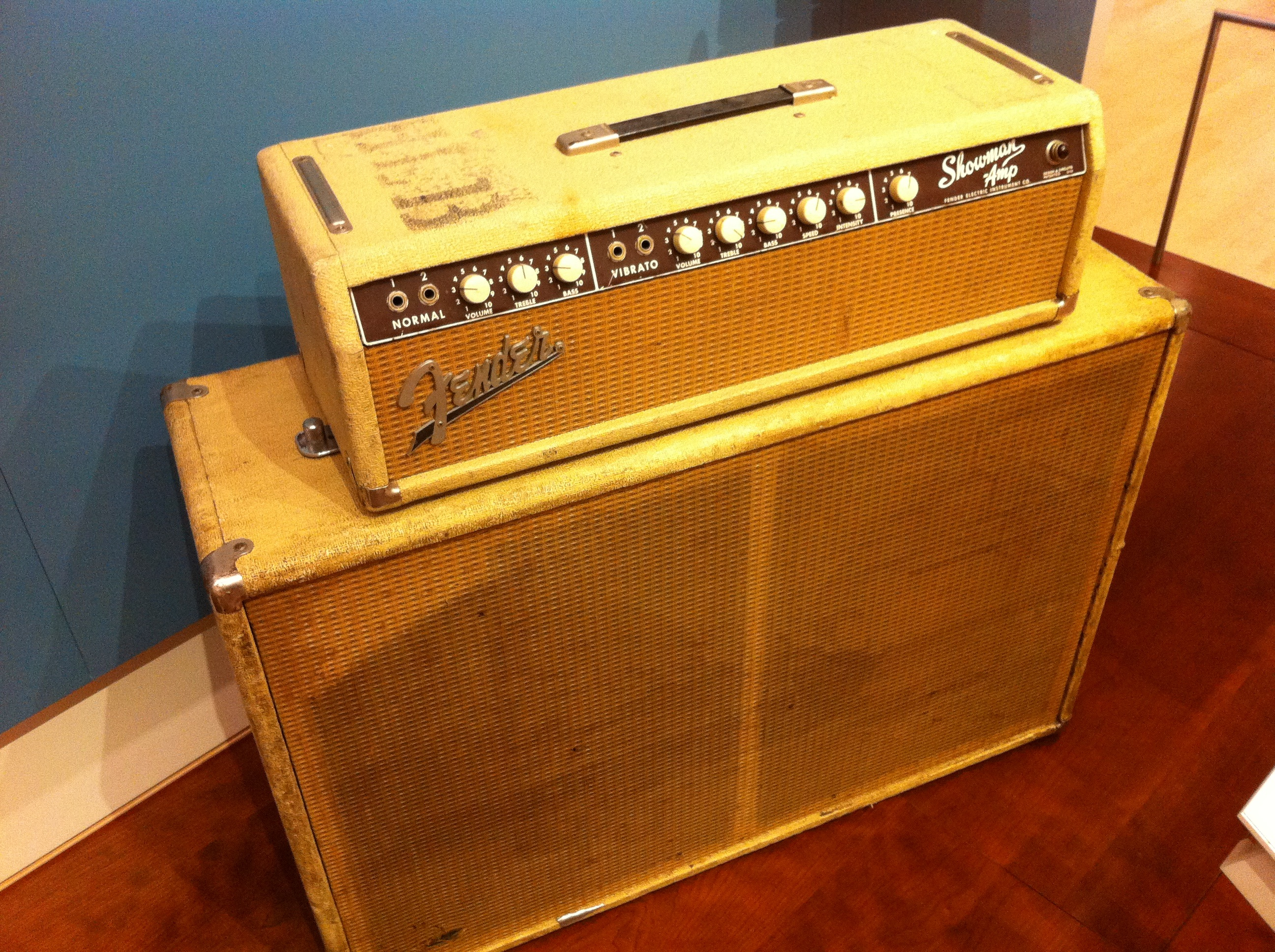
Fender Showman, owned by Dick Dale

Dale employed non-Western scales in his playing. He regularly used reverb, which became a trademark of surf guitar. Being left-handed, Dale would become known for his unorthodox method of playing a right-handed guitar upside-down, doing so (like Albert King) without restringing the guitar (while Hendrix, by comparison, would restring his guitar). Even after he acquired a proper left-handed guitar, Dale continued to use his reverse stringing. He often played by reaching over the fretboard, rather than wrapping his fingers up from underneath.

He partnered with Leo Fender to test new equipment. In interviews Dale noted that Fender had stated, "When it can withstand the barrage of punishment from Dick Dale, then it is fit for the human consumption." His combination of loud amplifiers and heavy-gauge strings led him to be called the "Father of Heavy Metal." After Dale blew up several Fender amplifiers, Leo Fender and Freddie Tavares saw Dale play at the Rendezvous Ballroom, Balboa, California, and found the problem arose from his creating a sound louder than the audience's screaming. The pair visited the James B. Lansing loudspeaker company and asked for a custom 15-inch loudspeaker, which became the JBL D130F model, and was known as the Single Showman Amp. Dale's combination of a Fender Stratocaster with a Fender Showman Amp allowed him to attain significantly louder volume levels unobtainable by then-conventional equipment. Furthering the development, the Showman Amp later added a second 15-inch JBL D-130 speaker, and it was named the Dual Showman Amp.

Dale's performances at the Rendezvous Ballroom in Balboa in mid to late 1961 are credited with the creation of the surf music phenomenon. Dale obtained permission to use the 3,000-person capacity ballroom for surfer dances after overcrowding at a local ice cream parlor where he performed made him seek other venues. The Rendezvous ownership and the city of Newport Beach agreed to Dale's request on the condition that he prohibit alcohol sales and implement a dress code. Dale's events at the ballrooms, called "stomps," quickly became legendary, and the events routinely sold out.

Dick Dale – "Let's Go Trippin'" (1961)
Dick Dale's "Let's Go Trippin'" (1961), which launched the surf music craze of the early 1960s

Dick Dale – "Miserlou" (1962)
Dick Dale's Misirlou (1962), a surf rock version of a folk song. It is often considered Dale's signature single.

"Let's Go Trippin'" is one of the first surf rock songs. This was followed by more locally released songs, including "Jungle Fever" and "Surf Beat" on his own Deltone label. His first full-length album was Surfers' Choice in 1962. The album was picked up by Capitol Records and distributed nationally, and Dale soon began appearing on The Ed Sullivan Show, and in films where he played his signature single "Miserlou." He later stated, "I still remember the first night we played it ("Misirlou"). I changed the tempo, and just started cranking on that mother. And ... it was eerie. The people came rising up off the floor, and they were chanting and stomping. I guess that was the beginning of the surfer's stomp." His second album was named after his performing nickname, "King of the Surf Guitar."

Dale later said "There was a tremendous amount of power I felt while surfing and that feeling of power was simply transferred into my guitar." His playing style reflected the experience he had when surfing, which he tried to project to his audience.

Dale and the Del-Tones performed both sides of his Capitol single "Secret Surfin' Spot" in the 1963 movie Beach Party, starring Frankie Avalon and Annette Funicello. The group performed the songs "My First Love," "Runnin' Wild" and "Muscle Beach" in the 1964 film Muscle Beach Party.

=== Later career ===
Surf rock's national popularity was somewhat brief, as the British Invasion began to overtake the American charts in 1964. Though he continued performing live, Dale developed colorectal cancer. In the liner notes of Better Shred Than Dead: The Dick Dale Anthology, Dale quoted Jimi Hendrix saying: "Then you'll never hear surf music again" in response to hearing he might be terminally ill. Dale covered "Third Stone from the Sun" as a tribute to Hendrix. Though he recovered, he retired from music for several years. In 1979, he almost lost a leg after a pollution-related infection of a mild swimming injury. As a result, Dale became an environmental activist and soon began performing again. He recorded a new album in 1986 and was nominated for a Grammy. In 1987, he appeared in the movie Back to the Beach, playing surf music and performing "Pipeline" with Stevie Ray Vaughan. In 1993, he recorded a guitar solo for the track "Should Have Known" released as a vinyl single by the Southern California indie band, The Pagodas.

The use of "Miserlou" in the 1994 Quentin Tarantino film Pulp Fiction gained him a new audience. The following year, John Peel praised his playing following a gig in the Garage, London. Peel later selected "Let's Go Trippin'" as the theme tune for his BBC Radio 4 series Home Truths. The same year, he recorded a surf-rock version of Camille Saint-Saëns's "Aquarium" from The Carnival of the Animals for the musical score of the enclosed roller coaster, Space Mountain at Disneyland in Anaheim, California.

Dick Dale participated in the Vans Warped Tour in 1996, along with NOFX, Pennywise and Rocket From The Crypt. A booking agent for the event told the Los Angeles Times: "I'm a fan [of Dale's], and I thought it would be cool to expose him to this group of young kids."

Dale was inducted to the Hollywood Rock Walk of Fame that same year. In 2000 the U.S. House of Representatives elected Dale into the Library of Congress Hall of Records for outstanding achievements in music. In March 2005, Q magazine placed Dale's version at number 89 in its list of the 100 Greatest Guitar Tracks.

In 2009, Dale was inducted into the Musicians Hall of Fame and Museum in Nashville, Tennessee. Dale is also a 2011 inductee into the Surfing Walk of Fame in Huntington Beach, California, in the Surf Culture category.

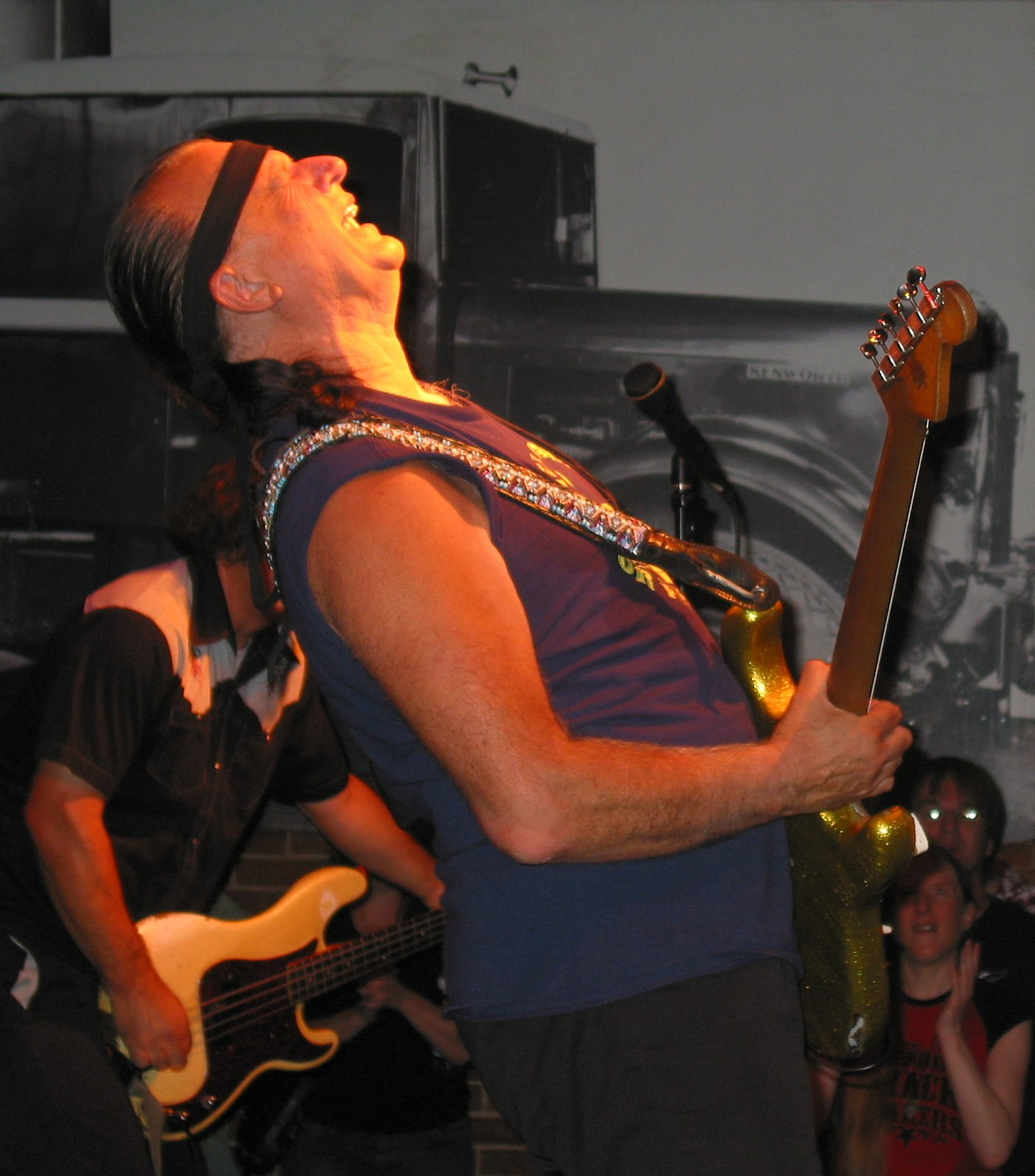
Dale performing in 2006

In June 2009, Dale began a West Coast tour from southern California to British Columbia, with approximately 20 concert dates. "Forever Came Calling" (or FCC) featured Dale's then-17-year-old son, Jimmie Dale on drums, who opened for him. He was scheduled to play the Australian One Great Night On Earth festival to raise funds to benefit those affected by the Black Saturday bushfires and other natural disasters.

Dale said that he was forced to keep touring to the end of his life, because of his inability to afford his medical costs. He had many health issues, including diabetes, kidney failure, and vertebrae damage that made performing excruciatingly painful. At the time of his death, Dale had tour dates scheduled into November 2019.

== Personal life ==
Dale was married three times. His first wife Jeannie in the 1970s was a Tahitian dancer in Hawaii and provided backup vocals for the 1975 release "Spanish Eyes." Together, they created a musical revue and toured at resorts in Las Vegas, Reno and Lake Tahoe. From the proceeds, the couple made successful investments in nightclubs and real estate, allowing Dale to purchase his three-story 17-room dream mansion at "the Wedge" in Newport Beach. Jeannie toured with Dale and his Deltones through the early '80s up until their very public and bitter divorce in 1984, which depleted much of Dale's accumulated wealth.

He met his second wife Jill in 1986. Together they had a son, James (who later performed professionally as Jimmy Dale), born in 1992. Dale credits Jill for his transition from surf music to a more raw and stripped-down style that consisted of just him and two other musicians. Jill provided back up vocals and drum tracks for Dale's 1993 Tribal Thunder album. Dale married his third wife Lana in 2011. Dale later owned a home with a small private airstrip in the Mojave Desert east of Los Angeles, and flew his own private aircraft (a Piper Tri-Pacer). The airstrip was marked as "Dale" on the NOAA aeronautical charts.

He said that, for health reasons, he never used alcohol or other drugs, and discouraged their use by band members and road crew. In 1972, he stopped eating red meat. He studied Kenpo karate for over 30 years. In early 2008, he experienced a recurrence of colorectal cancer and completed a surgical, chemotherapy, and radiation treatment regimen.

== Death ==
Dale died in Loma Linda, California, on March 16, 2019, at the age of 81. He was treated for heart failure and kidney failure prior to his death.

== Discography ==
=== Studio albums ===
==== As Dick Dale & His Del-Tones ====
- Surfers' Choice (Deltone, 1962; Capitol, 1963; Sundazed, 2006)
- King of the Surf Guitar (Capitol, 1963; Sundazed, 2007)
- Checkered Flag (Capitol, 1963; Sundazed, 2007)
- Mr. Eliminator (Capitol, 1964; Sundazed, 2007)
- Summer Surf (Capitol, 1964; Sundazed, 2007)

==== As Dick Dale ====
- Tribal Thunder (Hightone, 1993)
- Unknown Territory (Hightone, 1994)
- Calling Up Spirits (Beggars Banquet, 1996)
- Spacial Disorientation (Dick Dale/The Music Force, 2001)

=== Live albums ===
- Rock Out with Dick Dale & His Del-Tones: Live at Ciro's (Capitol, 1965; Sundazed [LP only], 2010)
- The Tigers Loose (Balboa, 1983; Rhino [LP only], 1987)
- Live on the Santa Monica Pier (Rockbeat, 1994/1996 [rel. 2014]) 2CD

=== Compilations ===
- Greatest Hits (GNP Crescendo [LP issue], 1975; GNP Crescendo [CD issue], 1992)
- King of the Surf Guitar: The Best of Dick Dale & His Del-Tones (Rhino [LP issue], 1986; Rhino [CD issue], 1989)
- Better Shred Than Dead: The Dick Dale Anthology (Rhino, 1997) 2CD
- Singles Collection '61–'65 (Sundazed, 2010) 2LP
- Guitar Legend: The Very Best of Dick Dale (Shout! Factory, 2010)
- King of the Surf Guitar (Rockbeat, 2012) 2LP; 1CD
- At the Drags (Rockbeat, 2012) 2LP; 1CD
- Misirlou: Dick Dale & His Del-Tones (Jasmine, 2018)

=== Singles ===
Year	Titles (A-side, B-side) Both sides from same album except where indicated	Label & number	Album	US	AU
1958	"Ooh-Whee-Marie" b/w "Breaking Heart"	Deltone 5012	Non-album singles	-	-
1959	"Stop Teasing" b/w "Without Your Love"	Deltone 5013	Non-album singles	–	-
1960	"St. Louis Blues" b/w "Jessie Pearl"	Deltone 5014	Non-album singles	–	-
1960	"We'll Never Hear the End of It" b/w "The Fairest of Them All"	Concert Room 371; Cupid 103	Non-album singles	–	-
1961	"Let's Go Trippin'" b/w "Del-Tone Rock" (non-album track)	Deltone 5017	Surfer's Choice	60	-
1962	"Jungle Fever" b/w "Shake-N-Stomp" (from Surfer's Choice)	Deltone 5018	Non-album singles	–	-
1962	"Miserlou" b/w "Eight Till Midnight"	Deltone 5019; Capitol 4939	Non-album singles	–	-
1962	"Peppermint Man" b/w "Surf Beat"	Deltone 5020; Capitol 4940	Surfer's Choice	–	-
1963	"A Run for Life" b/w "Lovin' on My Brain"	Deltone 5028	Non-album single	–	-
1963	"King of the Surf Guitar" b/w "Hava Nagila"	Capitol 4963	King of the Surf Guitar	–	-
1963	"Surfin' and A-Swingin'" b/w "Secret Surfin' Spot"	Capitol 5010	Non-album single	–	-
1963	"The Scavenger" b/w "Wild Ideas" (non-album track)	Capitol 5048	Checkered Flag	98	93
1963	"The Wedge" b/w "Night Rider"	Capitol 5098	Checkered Flag	–	-
1964	"Mr. Eliminator" b/w "The Victor"	Capitol 5140	Mr. Eliminator	–	-
1964	"Wild Wild Mustang" b/w "Grudge Run" (from Checkered Flag)	Capitol 5187	Non-album single	–	-
1964	"Glory Wave" b/w "Never on Sunday"	Capitol 5225	Summer Surf	–	-
1964	"Who Can He Be" b/w "Oh Marie"	Capitol 5290	Non-album single	–	-
1965	"Let's Go Trippin' 65" b/w "Watusi Jo"	Capitol 5389	Live at Ciro's	–	-
1967	"Taco Wagon" b/w "Spanish Kiss" (from Summer Surf)	Cougar 712	Mr. Eliminator	–	-
1975	"Let's Go Trippin'" b/w "Those Memories of You"	GNP Crescendo 804	Greatest Hits	–	-
1987	"Pipeline" (with Stevie Ray Vaughan) b/w "Love Struck Baby" by Stevie Ray Vaughan (non-album track)	Columbia 38-07340	Back to the Beach (soundtrack)	–	-

=== Soundtracks ===
- Pulp Fiction (1994)
- Rocket Jockey (1996)
