= Joanie Sommers =

American singer (born 1941)

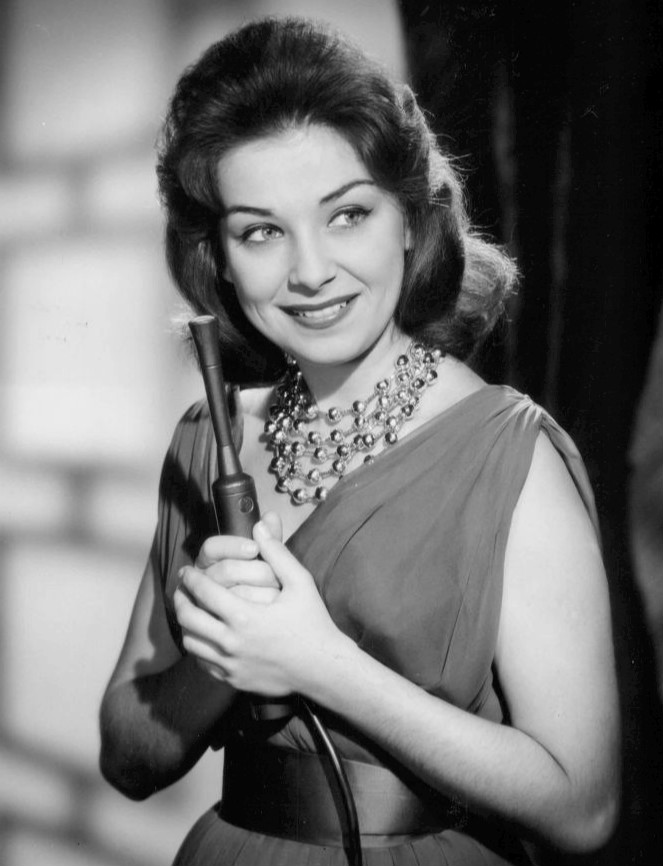
- Sommers circa 1960s

Background information
- Born: Joan Drost; February 24, 1941 (age 85); Buffalo, New York, U.S.
- Genre: Popular music
- Years active: 1959–1970s, 1980s–2005
- Label: Warner Bros. Records
- Spouse: Jerry Steiner (m. 1961; died 1972)

Joanie Sommers (born Joan Drost, February 24, 1941) is an American singer and actress. Her career has focused on jazz, standards and popular song. Early in her career she was billed as "the Voice of the Sixties"; she also collaborated with prominent arrangers, songwriters and producers. Her most recognized song is "Johnny Get Angry", which although atypical of her work became a popular success.

== Career ==
Sommers was born in Buffalo, New York, She began singing in church to deal with "a difficult childhood". In 1951, at the age of ten, she won an amateur talent contest on a Buffalo television program by singing the Hank Williams song, "Your Cheating Heart". She spent her youth living with her family in North Tonawanda and attended school there until the age of fourteen.

In 1955, her family relocated to the Venice neighborhood of Los Angeles, where she won honors as a vocalist with her high school band at Venice High School. She subsequently earned additional distinctions at Santa Monica City College.

Wider success came after a friend took her to the Deauville Country Club (now Braemar Country Club) in Santa Monica, where she sang with Tommy Oliver's band. He arranged for a demo record to be cut and presented it to Warner Bros. Records, whereupon Sommers was signed to the label.

Warner initially used her vocal talents singing "Am I Blue" on a 1959 Warner specialty record, Behind Closed Doors at a Recording Session, and on one side of the spoken-word single "Kookie's Love Song" with Edd Byrnes. The pairing with Byrnes led to a small role in 77 Sunset Strip, the private detective television series featuring Byrnes in the role of Gerald Lloyd "Kookie" Kookson III. In addition, she sang on Byrnes' "I Don't Dig You" and "Hot Rod Rock" which appeared on one of his albums.

Concurrently, Oliver supported Sommers by starring her in his orchestra engagements at California venues Hollywood Palladium and The Chalet at Lake Arrowhead.

Her 1960 debut single "One Boy" (from the musical Bye Bye Birdie) charted for three months, peaking at number 54 on the Billboard Top 100. Both "One Boy" and the flip side "I'll Never Be Free" were Billboard Spotlight Winners. A subsequent touring schedule included venues such as New York's Left Bank Club, Hollywood's Crescendo, Freddie's in Minneapolis, and The Cloister in Chicago, and appearances on the Jack Paar Show and Bobby Darin Special.

In early 1960, Warner released Sommers' first LP, Positively the Most, which did not include the "One Boy" hit single. Later that year, Warner released the single "Ruby-Duby-Du", featuring a vocal version of the Tobin Mathews & Co. instrumental from the motion picture Key Witness. The record did not chart.

In 1962, Sommers' single "Johnny Get Angry", released on Warner Bros. Records, reached number 7 on the Billboard Hot 100. It was held from the top of the charts by such hit songs as "Roses Are Red (My Love)" by Bobby Vinton, "I Can't Stop Loving You" by Ray Charles, and "Sealed With A Kiss" by Brian Hyland. Sommers' song "When the Boys Get Together" charted at number 94 later the same year.

In a 2001 interview, Sommers commented on the legacy of her greatest hit: "Twenty albums with some of the greatest names in jazz and I'm eternally linked to 'Johnny Get Angry'".

Her 1965 track "Don't Pity Me" was a Northern soul hit in the UK, often featured on Northern soul top lists. The single record routinely changes hands among collectors at over $500 a copy. The flip side, "My Block", was written by Jimmy Radcliffe, Bert Berns and Carl Spencer. It had previously been recorded by Clyde McPhatter on his Songs Of the Big City album and by The Chiffons, recording as The Four Pennies, on Rust Records.

Throughout the 1960s and 1970s, Sommers appeared on television as a singer and game show contestant, including shows such as Everybody's Talking, Hollywood Squares, You Don't Say, and The Match Game, as well as a performer on Dick Clark's Where the Action Is, Hullabaloo, and other variety shows. In 1966 she starred opposite Ricky Nelson in the Burt Bacharach and Hal David television musical On the Flip Side which was made the anthology series ABC Stage 67.

In 1963, she appeared on the January 22 segment of The Jack Benny Program, where she sang "I'll Never Stop Loving You"; another guest was actor Peter Lorre.

Her acting credits include Everything's Ducky (1961) opposite Mickey Rooney, and Jack Arnold's The Lively Set (1964), in which she sang "If You Love Him." In the last episode of The Wild Wild West, titled The Night of the Tycoons (April 11, 1969), she sang "Dreams, Dreams of a Lady's Love."

In a parallel career track of commercial vocal work, Sommers sang the jingles "Now It's Pepsi, For Those Who Think Young" (to the tune of Makin' Whoopee) and "Come Alive! You're in the Pepsi Generation" in radio and TV commercials. She came to be referred to as "The Pepsi Girl". Years later she sang the jingle "Now You See It, Now You Don't" for the sugar-free companion product, Diet Pepsi.

Sommers' voice work for animated films includes The Peppermint Choo Choo, which was scrubbed, although the music was released; Rankin/Bass' The Mouse on the Mayflower as Priscilla Mullins (1968); and B.C.: The First Thanksgiving (1973) in dual roles as the Fat Broad and the Cute Chick.

In the early 1970s, Sommers withdrew from show business to focus on family life. She began making public appearances again during the 1980s, including two on Santa Monica radio station KCRW's satirical program, The Cool & the Crazy, hosted by Art Fraud (Ronn Spencer) and Vic Tripp (Gene Sculatti).

In 2001, Sommers sang two songs on Abe Most's Camard album, I Love You Much Too Much. She performed the title track and "Bei Mir Bist du Schoen." She sang a chorus in Yiddish on both tracks.

In 2004 the Japan-only album release, Johnny Got Angry, consisted of all original tunes written by Sommers' friend and voice actor, Will Ryan.

== Personal life ==
Sommers was married to theatrical agent Jerry Steiner from 1961 until his sudden death in 1972. They had three children.

== Singles discography ==
| Release date | Titles Both sides from same album except where indicated | Record label | Chart positions | | | Album |
| Release date | Titles Both sides from same album except where indicated | Record label | US Billboard Hot 100 | US Billboard AC | CAN CHUM Chart | Album |
|---|---|---|---|---|---|---|
| 1959 | "Kookie's Love Song"; With Edd Byrnes & The Mary Kaye Trio b/w Sing-along version by Edd Byrnes | Warner Bros. 5114 | — | — | — | Non-album tracks |
| 1960 | "One Boy" b/w "I'll Never Be Free" (Non-album track) | Warner Bros. 5157 | 54 | — | 27 | Johnny Get Angry |
| 1960 | "Be My Love" b/w "Why Don't You Do Right (Get Me Some Money Too)" | Warner Bros. 5177 | — | — | — | Non-album tracks |
| 1960 | "Ruby-Duby-Du" b/w "Bob White (Whatcha Gonna Swing Tonight?)" | Warner Bros. 5183 | — | — | — | Non-album tracks |
| 1961 | "I Don't Want to Walk Without You" b/w "Seems Like Long, Long Ago" | Warner Bros. 5201 | — | — | — | Johnny Get Angry |
| 1961 | "The Piano Boy" b/w "Serenade of the Bells" (Non-album track) | Warner Bros. 5226 | — | — | — | Johnny Get Angry |
| 1961 | "Makin' Whoopee" b/w "What's Wrong with Me" | Warner Bros. 5241 | — | — | — | Non-album tracks |
| 1962 | "Johnny Get Angry" b/w "Theme from A Summer Place" | Warner Bros. 5275 | 7 | — | 4 | Johnny Get Angry |
| 1962 | "When the Boys Get Together" b/w "Passing Strangers" | Warner Bros. 5308 | 94 | — | 37 | Non-album tracks |
| 1962 | "Goodbye Joey" b/w "Bobby's Hobbies" | Warner Bros. 5324 | — | — | — | Non-album tracks |
| 1963 | "Since Randy Moved Away" b/w "Memories, Memories" (Non-album track) | Warner Bros. 5339 | — | — | — | Johnny Get Angry |
| 1963 | "A Little Bit of Everything" b/w "Henny Penny" | Warner Bros. 5350 | — | — | — | Non-album tracks |
| 1963 | "One Boy" b/w "June Is Bustin' Out All Over" | Warner Bros. 5361 | — | — | — | Johnny Get Angry |
| 1963 | "Little Girl Bad" b/w "Wishing Well" | Warner Bros. 5374 | 132 | — | — | Non-album tracks |
| 1963 | "Big Man" b/w "Goodbye Summer" | Warner Bros. 5390 | — | — | — | Non-album tracks |
| 1964 | "I'd Be So Good for You" b/w "I'm Gonna Know He's Mine" | Warner Bros. 5437 | — | — | — | Non-album tracks |
| 1964 | "If You Love Him" b/w "I Think I'm Gonna Cry Now" | Warner Bros. 5454 | — | — | — | Non-album tracks |
| 1965 | "Don't Pity Me" b/w "My Block" | Warner Bros. 5629 | — | — | — | Non-album tracks |
| 1966 | "Never Throw Your Dreams Away" b/w "You've Got Possibilities" | Columbia 43567 | — | — | — | Non-album tracks |
| 1966 | "Alfie" b/w "You Take What Comes Along" (from Come Alive!) | Columbia 43731 | — | 9 | — | Non-album tracks |
| 1966 | "It Doesn't Matter Anymore" b/w "Take a Broken Heart" | Columbia 43950 | — | — | — | Non-album tracks |
| 1967 | "Trains and Boats and Planes" b/w "Yesterday's Morning" | Capitol 5936 | — | — | — | Non-album tracks |
| 1968 | "Talk Until Daylight" b/w "The Great Divide" | Warner Bros. 7251 | — | 29 | — | Non-album tracks |
| 1969 | "Little Girl from Greenwood, Georgia" b/w "Step Inside Love" | Happy Tiger 522 | — | — | — | Non-album tracks |
| 1970 | "Sunshine After the Rain" b/w "Tell Him" | Happy Tiger 537 | — | — | — | Non-album tracks |
| 1978 | "The Peppermint Choo Choo" b/w "The Peppermint Engineer" | Peppermint Choo Choo 302; ABC 12323 | — | — | — | Non-album tracks |

== Album discography ==
- 1960: Positively the Most! – Warner Bros. W1346
- 1961: The "Voice" of the 60's – Warner Bros. W1412
- 1962: For Those Who Think Young – Warner Bros. W1436
- 1962: Johnny Get Angry – Warner Bros. W1470
- 1962: Let's Talk About Love – Warner Bros W1474
- 1963: Sommers' Seasons – Warner Bros. WS1504
- 1964: Softly, the Brazilian Sound – Warner Bros. WS1575
- 1965: Come Alive! – Columbia CS 9295
- 1966: On the Flip Side – Original Cast Album (with Rick Nelson, tracks 2, 4 and 8) – Decca 4824
- 1982: Dream – Discovery DS-887
- 1988: Tangerine – HiBrite PCB-203
- 1992: A Fine Romance – HiBrite HTCP-10
- 1994: Look Out! It's Joanie Sommers (with Shelly Manne and The Bobby Troup Sextet) – Studio West 106
- 1995: Hits and Rarities – Marginal MAR-001
- 2000: Here, There and Everywhere! – Absord ABCJ 313
- 2000: Johnny Got Angry – Absord ABCJ 314
- 2001: I Love You Much Too Much – Camard (not numbered)
- 2005: Sings Bossa Nova – Absord ABCJ 339
- 2011: The Complete Warner Bros. Singles – Real Gone Music RGM-0007
- 2013: Come Alive!: The Complete Columbia Recordings – Real Gone Music RGM-0185
