= Johnny Get Angry =

Single by Joanie Sommers

from the album Johnny Get Angry
- B-side: "Theme from A Summer Place"
- Released: May 1962
- Genre: Pop
- Length: 2:31
- Label: Warner
- Songwriters: Hal David, Sherman Edwards
- Producer: Stan Applebaum

Joanie Sommers singles chronology
| "Makin' Whoopie" (1961) | "Johnny Get Angry" (1962) | "When the Boys Get Together" (1962) |

"Johnny Get Angry" is a song written by Hal David and Sherman Edwards and performed by Joanie Sommers. It reached No.7 on the U.S. pop chart in 1962 and No. 4 on Canada's CHUM Chart. It was featured on her 1962 album Johnny Get Angry.

The track was arranged and produced by Stan Applebaum. This version featured a bass guitar, rhythm guitar, drums, horns, jazz piano, strings, a wordless female chorus, plus an ensemble of kazoos that are heard during the instrumental section.

In the song, the girl challenges Johnny to get angry with her by telling him that they're through. She wants him to lecture her, act like a "brave man" and a "cave man" which, in her eyes, would show her that he cares for her. She refers to occasions when they are dancing and Johnny allows another guy to keep cutting in. She asks him, "Must you always be so meek?"

The song ranked No.56 on Billboard magazine's Top 100 singles of 1962.

== Other charting versions ==
- Carol Deene, in 1962 - which reached No.32 on the UK Singles Chart.

== Other versions ==
- Shelley Fabares, on her 1962 album The Things We Did Last Summer.
- Motor Totemist Guild recorded a rendition entitled "Get Angry" for their 1984 album Infra Dig.

== In popular culture ==
- Vinnie Monte released an answer song entitled "Joanie Don't Be Angry" in October 1962.
- Sommers' version was included in the 1991 film Flirting.
- K.d. lang and The Reclines performed it on Saturday Night Live on December 2, 1989.
- Anne Bobby's character Lori Winston sings it in a deleted scene from 1990's Nightbreed.

== See also ==
- List of 1960s one-hit wonders in the United States
