= Sue Thompson =

American singer (1925–2021)

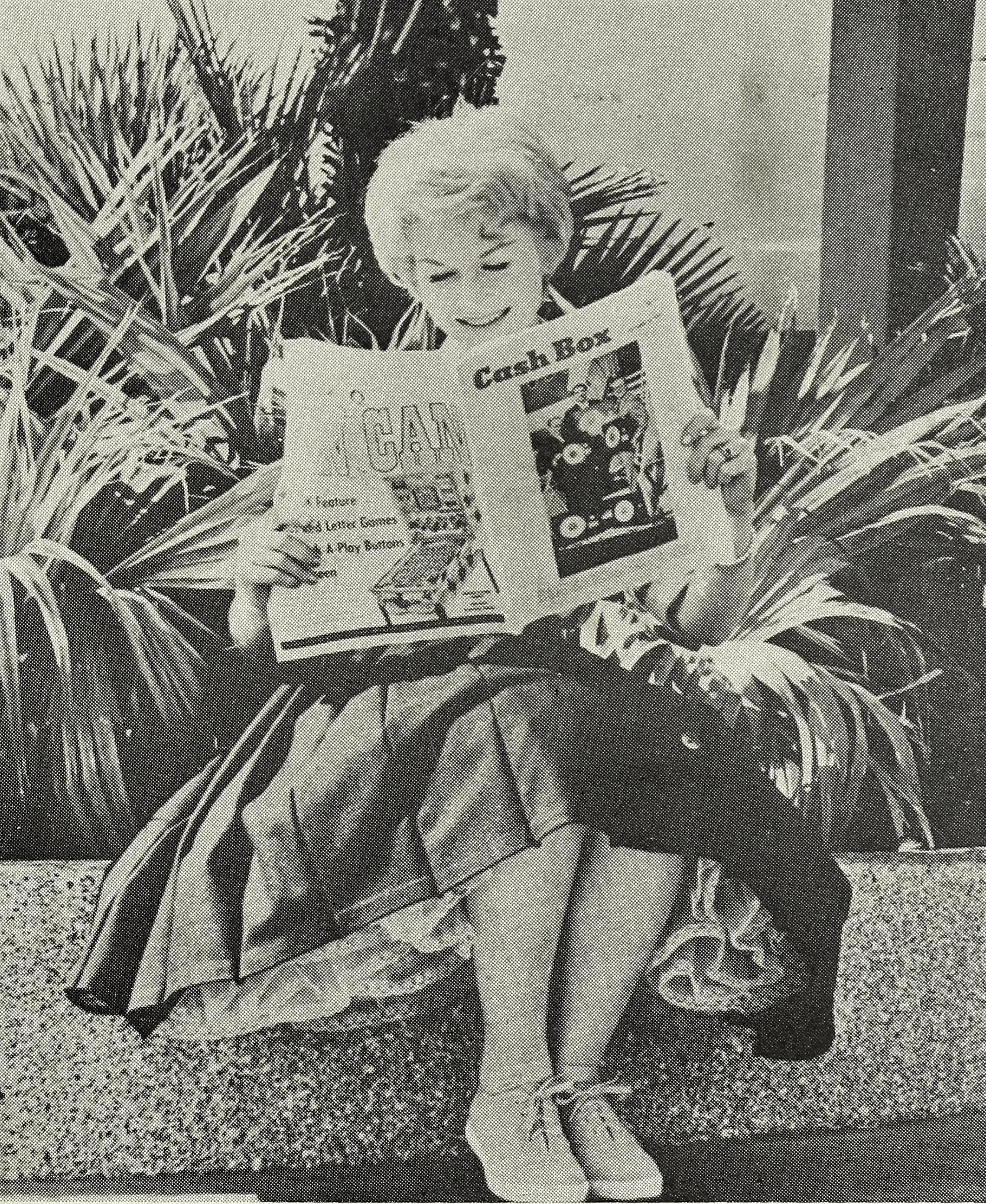
- Thompson on the cover of Cash Box, 1962

Background information
- Born: Eva Sue McKee; July 19, 1925; Nevada, Missouri, U.S.
- Died: September 23, 2021 (aged 96) Pahrump, Nevada, U.S.
- Genres: Pop, country
- Occupation: Singer
- Instrument: Vocals
- Years active: 1950–1990s
- Labels: Mercury; Decca; Columbia; Hickory
- Spouse(s): Dude Martin, Hank Penny

Sue Thompson (born Eva Sue McKee; July 19, 1925 – September 23, 2021) was an American pop and country music singer. She is best known for the million selling 1961 hits "Sad Movies (Make Me Cry)" and "Norman", "James (Hold The Ladder Steady)" (1962), and "Paper Tiger" (1965).

== Early life ==
Thompson was born in Nevada, Missouri in July 1925. By the age of 7, she was singing and playing the guitar on stage. She later moved with her family to live in San Jose, California.

During World War II, she worked at a defense plant. She married when she was 17, and had a daughter at 20, but the marriage failed and she and her husband split up after three years. To keep supporting herself after her divorce, she returned to the nightclub scene in California, now using the name Sue Thompson. In San Jose, she won a talent contest, thus catching the attention of a bandleader and radio/TV host named Dude Martin (real name John Stephen McSwain), who invited her to sing with his band. This led to their marriage. They recorded duets together, including "If You Want My Lovin'", which helped her get a solo contract from Mercury Records in 1950 and made Billboard's Country and Western Disk Jockeys Pick chart. She released numerous singles on Mercury between 1951 and 1954, with no chart action.

== Recording career ==
Within a year, she divorced Martin, and married Hank Penny, a comedian and singer, in 1953. Penny and Thompson hosted a TV show in Los Angeles together before eventually moving to Las Vegas. After her contract with Mercury ended, Thompson recorded for Decca Records from 1954–57, again without a commercial breakthrough. Thompson and Penny had a son, Greg Penny, but divorced in 1963.

In 1960, Thompson signed on with Columbia Records, who renamed the singer "Taffy Thomas" and issued one non-charting single under this artist name. Thereafter, the Taffy Thomas moniker was quickly dropped, and Thompson signed with Hickory Records. In 1961, after having issued over a dozen non-charting singles in a decade-long recording career, Thompson's "Sad Movies (Make Me Cry)" became a No. 5 hit on the pop charts. She followed this up successfully with "Norman," which reached No. 3. Both of these hit singles were written by songwriter John D. Loudermilk. They both sold over one million copies, and were awarded gold discs. Both were also chart successes in Australia, reaching No. 3 and No. 8 respectively.

In 1962, "Have a Good Time" was a Top 40 hit and in 1963, "Willie Can" was a minor hit. Her early-1960s hits made Thompson, then in her late 30s but with a much younger-sounding voice, a favorite among the teenage crowd and briefly a rival to the much younger Connie Francis and Brenda Lee. Two additional hits, also written by Loudermilk, were "James (Hold the Ladder Steady)", and 1965's "Paper Tiger," her last Top 30 hit and her biggest hit in Britain and in Australia, where it reached No. 3.

== Later career ==
In the late 1960s, she went back to country music and released the album This Is Sue Thompson Country in 1969. Her singleThoughts with Roy Acuff Jr. reached No. 39 on the Canadian Country charts, November 8, 1969. In 1971 she worked with country music singer Don Gibson on some albums, and they had minor hits with "I Think They Call It Love", "Good Old Fashioned Country Love", and "Oh, How Love Changes". She recorded further solo singles for the country charts, like "Big Mable Murphy", which made the Top 50 in 1975 and "Never Naughty Rosie", her last chart single in 1976. She also performed mainly at the Las Vegas casinos and at clubs in Hollywood, like the Palomino Club. In the 1990s, she settled in Las Vegas, and continued to periodically perform.

She also appeared on American Bandstand, Where the Action Is, The Buddy Deane Show, and The Lloyd Thaxton Show (1966 visit and performance of "Paper Tiger").

In 2009 Thompson's son, record producer Greg Penny, recorded her acoustic cover of her favourite song, the 1952 hit "You Belong to Me". The demo was given its radio premiere during her 2010 interview on the South Australian radio show "The Doo Wop Corner" by Carmen Kaye.

== Death ==
Sue Thompson died at her daughter's home in Pahrump, Nevada, on September 23, 2021, at the age of 96.

== Discography ==
=== Albums ===
Year	Album	Chart Positions	
Year	Album	US	US Country
1961	Meet Sue Thompson	—	—
1962	Two of a Kind	—	—
1963	Golden Hits	—	—
1965	Paper Tiger	134	—
1965	The Country Side of Sue Thompson	—	—
1966	Sue Thompson with Strings Attached	—	—
1969	This Is Sue Thompson Country	—	—
1972	The Two of Us Together (with Don Gibson)	—	—
1974	Sweet Memories	—	—
1974	And Love Me	—	—
1975	Oh How Love Changes (with Don Gibson)	—	43
1975	Big Mable Murphy	—	—

=== Singles ===
Year	Single	Chart Positions							Album
Year	Single	US	US Cashbox	US Country	US AC	AUS	CAN	UK	Album
1961	"Sad Movies (Make Me Cry)"	5	5	—	1	6	30	46	Meet Sue Thompson
1961	"Norman"	3	4	—	—	4	3	—	Meet Sue Thompson
1962	"Two of a Kind"	42	37	—	8	40	36	—	Two of a Kind
1962	"It Has To Be" (flip side)	—	150	—	—	—	—	—	Two of a Kind
1962	"Have a Good Time"	31	31	—	9	45	—	—	Golden Hits
1962	"If Only the Boy Knew" (flip side)	112	143	—	—	45	—	—	Golden Hits
1962	"James (Hold the Ladder Steady)"	17	22	—	—	6	16	—	Golden Hits
1962	"Willie Can"	78	77	—	—	44	38	—	Golden Hits
1963	"What's Wrong Bill"	135	—	—	—	—	—	—	Paper Tiger
1963	"Suzie"	—	127	—	—	—	—	—	Paper Tiger
1963	"True Confession" (flip side)	—	148	—	—	—	—	—	Paper Tiger
1963	"I Like Your Kind of Love" (with Bob Luman)	—	142	—	—	26	—	—	Non-album single
1964	"Big Daddy"	132	—	—	—	—	—	—	Non-album single
1964	"Paper Tiger"^{A}	23	18	—	—	3	15	30	Paper Tiger
1965	"What I'm Needin' Is You"	—	—	—	—	—	—	—	Paper Tiger
1965	"Stop Th' Music" (flip side)	115	135	—	—	—	—	—	With Strings Attached
1966	"Put It Back (Where You Found It)"	131	—	—	—	—	—	—	Non-album single
1966	"What Should I Do"	—	148	—	—	—	—	—	Non-album single
1972	"What a Woman in Love Won't Do"	—	—	—	—	—	—	—	Sweet Memories
1972	"Candy and Roses"	—	—	72	—	76	—	—	Sweet Memories
1973	"Find Out"	—	—	—	—	—	—	—	Sweet Memories
1974	"Making Love to You is Just Like Eating Peanuts"	—	—	—	—	—	—	—	And Love Me
1974	"And Love Me"	—	—	—	—	—	—	—	And Love Me
1975	"The Very Thought of You"	—	—	—	—	—	—	—	And Love Me
1975	"Any Other Morning"	—	—	—	—	—	—	—	Big Mable Murphy
1975	"Big Mable Murphy"	—	—	50	40	—	—	—	Big Mable Murphy
1976	"Never Naughty Rosie"	—	—	95	—	—	—	—	Non-album single

- ^{A}"Paper Tiger" peaked at No. 8 on the RPM Top Singles chart in Canada.

=== Singles with Don Gibson ===
Year	Single	Chart Positions		Album
Year	Single	US Country	CAN Country	Album
1971	"The Two of Us Together"	50	—	The Two of Us Together
1971	"Did You Ever Think"	71	—	The Two of Us Together
1971	"I Think They Call It Love"	37	—	The Two of Us Together
1972	"Cause I Love You"	64	—	The Two of Us Together
1972	"Go With Me"	52	49	The Two of Us Together
1973	"Warm Love"	53	52	The Two of Us Together
1974	"Good Old Fashioned Country Love"	31	29	Oh, How Love Changes
1975	"Oh, How Love Changes"	36	—	Oh, How Love Changes
1976	"Get Ready, Here I Come"	98	—	Oh, How Love Changes
