= List of Billboard Hot 100 top-ten singles in 1961 =

This is a list of singles that have peaked in the top 10 of the Billboard Hot 100 during 1961.

Elvis Presley scored six top ten hits during the year with "Surrender", "I Feel So Bad", "Little Sister", "(Marie's the Name) His Latest Flame", "Are You Lonesome Tonight?", and "Can't Help Falling in Love", the most among all other artists.

== Top-ten singles ==
Top ten entry date	Single	Artist(s)	Peak	Peak date	Weeks in top ten
Singles from 1960
December 12	"Wonderland by Night"	Bert Kaempfert	1	January 9	10
December 12	"Exodus"	Ferrante & Teicher	2	January 23	11
December 26	"Corrina, Corinna"	Ray Peterson	9	January 9	5
December 31	"Angel Baby"	Rosie and the Originals	5	January 23	7
Singles from 1961
January 9	"Will You Love Me Tomorrow"	The Shirelles	1	January 30	7
January 9	"Rubber Ball"	Bobby Vee	6	January 9	5
January 16	"Calcutta"	Lawrence Welk	1	February 13	9
January 23	"Shop Around"	The Miracles	2	February 20	6
January 23	"Calendar Girl"	Neil Sedaka	4	February 13	5
January 30	"Emotions"	Brenda Lee	7	February 13	4
February 6	"My Empty Arms"	Jackie Wilson	9	February 6	1
February 13	"Pony Time"	Chubby Checker	1	February 27	8
February 13	"There's a Moon Out Tonight"	The Capris	3	February 27	4
February 20	"Dedicated to the One I Love"	The Shirelles	3	March 27	9
February 20	"Wheels"	The String-a-Longs	3	March 6	6
February 27	"Surrender"	Elvis Presley	1	March 20	8
February 27	"Don't Worry"	Marty Robbins	3	March 20	7
February 27	"Where the Boys Are"	Connie Francis	4	March 20	5
February 27	"Ebony Eyes"	The Everly Brothers	8	March 20	4
March 6	"Baby Sittin' Boogie"	Buzz Clifford	6	March 13	3
March 13	"Spanish Harlem"	Ben E. King	10	March 13	1
March 20	"Apache"	Jørgen Ingmann and his Guitar	2	April 3	5
March 20	"Walk Right Back"	The Everly Brothers	7	March 27	4
March 27	"Blue Moon"	The Marcels	1	April 3	8
March 27	"Gee Whiz (Look at His Eyes)"	Carla Thomas	10	March 27	1
April 3	"On the Rebound"	Floyd Cramer	4	April 17	6
April 3	"Runaway"	Del Shannon	1	April 24	9
April 3	"(I Don't Know Why) But I Do"	Clarence "Frogman" Henry	4	April 24	5
April 10	"Mother-in-Law"	Ernie K-Doe	1	May 22	8
April 17	"Asia Minor"	Kokomo	8	April 17	1
April 17	"A Hundred Pounds of Clay"	Gene McDaniels	3	May 8	8
April 24	"I've Told Every Little Star"	Linda Scott	3	May 1	5
April 24	"You Can Depend on Me"	Brenda Lee	6	May 8	4
April 24	"Take Good Care of Her"	Adam Wade	7	May 1	4
April 24	"One Mint Julep"	Ray Charles	8	May 1	3
May 8	"Portrait of My Love"	Steve Lawrence	9	May 8	1
May 15	"Daddy's Home"	Shep and the Limelites	2	May 29	4
May 15	"Travelin' Man"	Ricky Nelson	1	May 29	8
May 15	"Mama Said"	The Shirelles	4	May 29	4
May 22	"Running Scared"	Roy Orbison	1	June 5	4
May 22	"Breakin' in a Brand New Broken Heart"	Connie Francis	7	May 29	3
May 22	"Hello Mary Lou"	Ricky Nelson	9	May 22	1
May 29	"I Feel So Bad"	Elvis Presley	5	June 5	3
May 29	"Tragedy"	The Fleetwoods	10	May 29	1
June 5	"Stand by Me"	Ben E. King	4	June 12	4
June 5	"Moody River"	Pat Boone	1	June 19	6
June 5	"Raindrops"	Dee Clark	2	June 26	8
June 12	"The Writing on the Wall"	Adam Wade	5	July 3	5
June 12	"Every Beat of My Heart"	The Pips	6	July 10	6
June 12	"Quarter to Three"	Gary U.S. Bonds	1	June 26	8
June 12	"The Boll Weevil Song"	Brook Benton	2	July 10	8
June 19	"Tossin' and Turnin'"	Bobby Lewis	1	July 10	12
June 19	"Those Oldies but Goodies (Remind Me of You)"	Little Caesar & the Romans	9	June 26	3
July 3	"Yellow Bird"	Arthur Lyman	4	July 24	5
July 10	"Hats Off to Larry"	Del Shannon	5	July 31	5
July 10	"Dance on Little Girl"	Paul Anka	10	July 10	1
July 17	"San Antonio Rose"	Floyd Cramer	8	July 17	1
July 17	"I Like It Like That"	Chris Kenner	2	July 31	7
July 17	"Dum Dum"	Brenda Lee	4	July 31	6
July 24	"Together"	Connie Francis	6	August 7	4
July 24	"Let's Twist Again"	Chubby Checker	8	August 7	5
July 31	"Last Night"	The Mar-Keys	3	August 7	5
August 7	"Pretty Little Angel Eyes"	Curtis Lee	7	August 7	4
August 7	"Wooden Heart (Muss i denn)"	Joe Dowell	1	August 28	7
August 7	"Michael"	The Highwaymen	1	September 4	9
August 14	"School Is Out"	Gary U.S. Bonds	5	September 4	4
August 21	"You Don't Know What You've Got (Until You Lose It)"	Ral Donner	4	September 4	4
August 28	"Don't Bet Money Honey"	Linda Scott	9	August 28	2
August 28	"Hurt"	Timi Yuro	4	September 11	3
September 4	"Take Good Care of My Baby"	Bobby Vee	1	September 18	7
September 4	"My True Story"	The Jive Five	3	September 11	4
September 4	"As If I Didn't Know"	Adam Wade	10	September 4	2
September 11	"Does Your Chewing Gum Lose Its Flavor (on the Bedpost Overnight)"	Lonnie Donegan	5	September 25	4
September 11	"Who Put the Bomp (in the Bomp, Bomp, Bomp)"	Barry Mann	7	September 25	2
September 11	"Little Sister"	Elvis Presley	5	October 2	4
September 18	"(Marie's the Name) His Latest Flame"	Elvis Presley	4	September 18	2
September 18	"Crying"	Roy Orbison	2	October 9	5
September 18	"Without You"	Johnny Tillotson	7	September 18	2
September 18	"One Track Mind"	Bobby Lewis	9	September 18	1
September 18	"When We Get Married"	The Dreamlovers	10	September 18	1
September 25	"The Mountain's High"	Dick and Dee Dee	2	September 25	3
October 2	"Hit the Road Jack"	Ray Charles	1	October 9	8
October 2	"Mexico"	Bob Moore	7	October 2	3
October 2	"You Must Have Been a Beautiful Baby"	Bobby Darin	5	October 16	3
October 2	"Bristol Stomp"	The Dovells	2	October 23	9
October 9	"Runaround Sue"	Dion	1	October 23	9
October 9	"Let's Get Together"	Hayley Mills	8	October 23	3
October 16	"Sad Movies (Make Me Cry)"	Sue Thompson	5	October 23	5
October 16	"Big Bad John"	Jimmy Dean	1	November 6	10
October 16	"Ya Ya"	Lee Dorsey	7	October 30	3
October 23	"This Time"	Troy Shondell	6	October 23	6
October 23	"I Love How You Love Me"	The Paris Sisters	5	October 30	3
October 23	"The Fly"	Chubby Checker	7	November 13	5
November 6	"Fool #1"	Brenda Lee	3	November 13	5
November 6	"Tower of Strength"	Gene McDaniels	5	November 13	5
November 13	"Please Mr. Postman"	The Marvelettes	1	December 11	7
November 20	"Goodbye Cruel World"	James Darren	3	December 4	7
November 27	"Heartaches"	The Marcels	7	November 27	1
November 27	"Crazy"	Patsy Cline	9	November 27	2
December 4	"Walk On By"	Leroy Van Dyke	5	December 11	8
December 4	"I Understand (Just How You Feel)"	The G-Clefs	9	December 4	1
December 11	"The Lion Sleeps Tonight"	The Tokens	1	December 18	8
December 11	"Run to Him"	Bobby Vee	2	December 25	6
December 11	"Tonight"	Ferrante & Teicher	8	December 11	1
December 11	"Let There Be Drums"	Sandy Nelson	7	December 18	3

=== 1960 peaks ===
List of Billboard Hot 100 top ten singles in 1961 which peaked in 1960
Top ten entry date	Single	Artist(s)	Peak	Peak date	Weeks in top ten
November 14	"Last Date"	Floyd Cramer	2	November 28	10
November 21	"Are You Lonesome Tonight?"	Elvis Presley	1	November 28	11
November 28	"North to Alaska"	Johnny Horton	4	December 19	8
December 19	"You're Sixteen"	Johnny Burnette	8	December 26	4

=== 1962 peaks ===
List of Billboard Hot 100 top ten singles in 1961 which peaked in 1962
Top ten entry date	Single	Artist(s)	Peak	Peak date	Weeks in top ten
December 4	"The Twist"	Chubby Checker	1	January 13	13
December 11	"Happy Birthday, Sweet Sixteen"	Neil Sedaka	6	January 6	6
December 18	"Peppermint Twist - Part 1"	Joey Dee and the Starliters	1	January 27	11
December 25	"Can't Help Falling in Love"	Elvis Presley	2	February 3	8

== See also ==
- 1961 in music
- List of Billboard Hot 100 number ones of 1961
- Billboard Year-End Hot 100 singles of 1961
