= Billboard Year-End Hot 100 singles of 1961 =

Ranking of recorded music

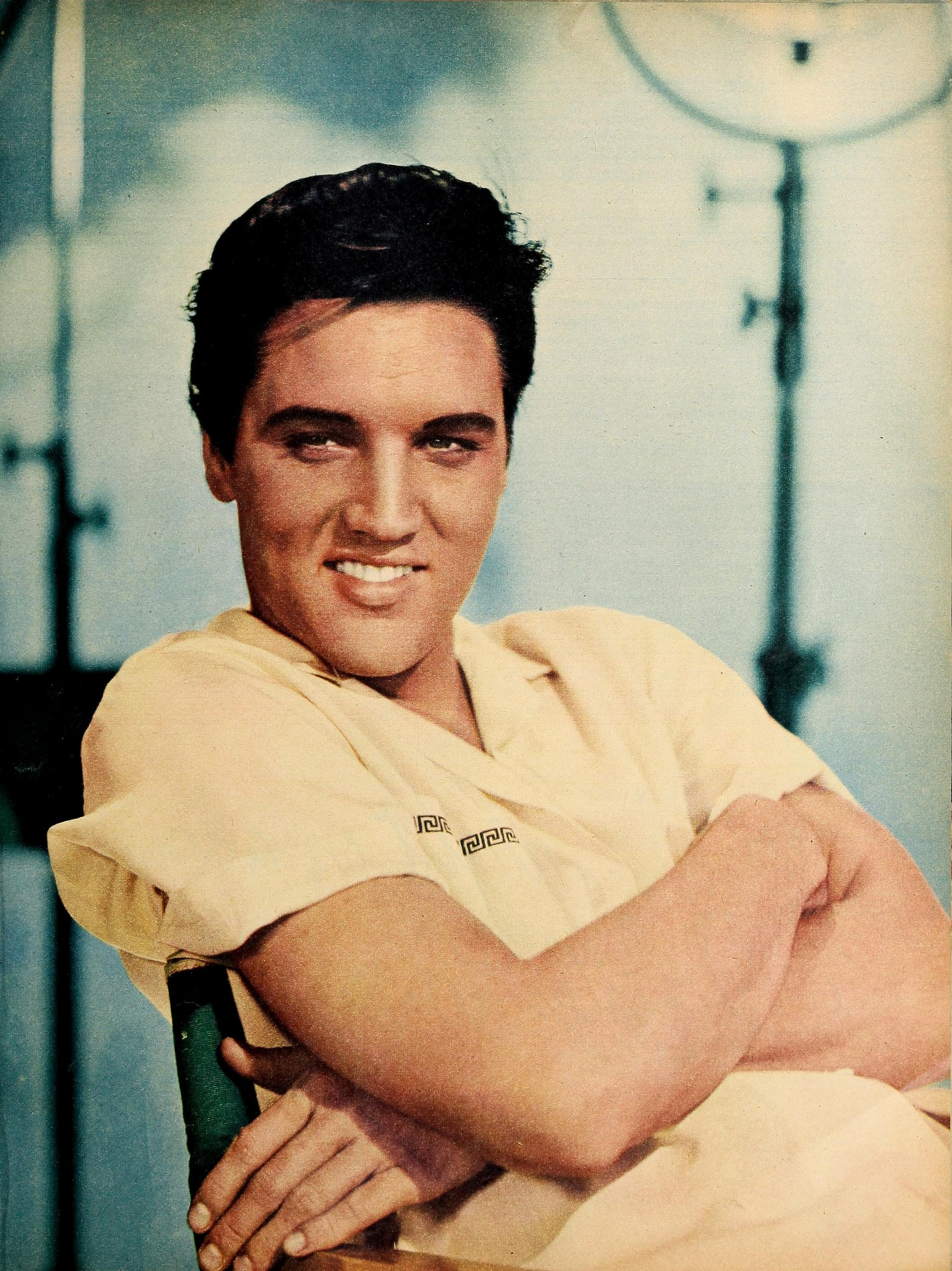
Elvis Presley had four songs on the Year-End Hot 100, the most of any artist in 1961.

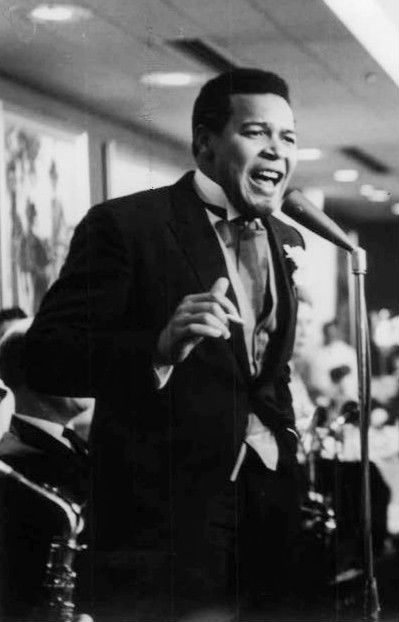
Chubby Checker had three songs on the Year-End Hot 100.

This is a list of Billboard magazine's top Hot 100 songs of 1961. The Top 100, as revealed in the edition of Billboard dated January 6, 1962, is based on Hot 100 charts from the issue dates of January through November 1961.

No.	Title	Artist(s)
1	"Tossin' and Turnin'"	Bobby Lewis
2	"I Fall to Pieces"	Patsy Cline
3	"Michael"	The Highwaymen
4	"Crying"	Roy Orbison
5	"Runaway"	Del Shannon
6	"My True Story"	The Jive Five
7	"Pony Time"	Chubby Checker
8	"Wheels"	The String-A-Longs
9	"Raindrops"	Dee Clark
10	"Wooden Heart"	Joe Dowell
11	"Calcutta"	Lawrence Welk
12	"Take Good Care of My Baby"	Bobby Vee
13	"Running Scared"	Roy Orbison
14	"Dedicated to the One I Love"	The Shirelles
15	"Last Night"	The Mar-Keys
16	"Will You Love Me Tomorrow"	The Shirelles
17	"Exodus"	Ferrante & Teicher
18	"Where the Boys Are"	Connie Francis
19	"Hit the Road Jack"	Ray Charles
20	"Sad Movies (Make Me Cry)"	Sue Thompson
21	"Mother-in-Law"	Ernie K-Doe
22	"Bristol Stomp"	The Dovells
23	"Travelin' Man"	Ricky Nelson
24	"Shop Around"	The Miracles
25	"The Boll Weevil Song"	Brook Benton
26	"A Hundred Pounds of Clay"	Gene McDaniels
27	"The Mountain's High"	Dick and Dee Dee
28	"Don't Worry"	Marty Robbins
29	"On the Rebound"	Floyd Cramer
30	"Portrait of My Love"	Steve Lawrence
31	"Quarter to Three"	Gary U.S. Bonds
32	"Who Put the Bomp (in the Bomp, Bomp, Bomp)"	Barry Mann
33	"Calendar Girl"	Neil Sedaka
34	"I Like It Like That"	Chris Kenner
35	"Apache"	Jørgen Ingmann
36	"Don't Bet Money Honey"	Linda Scott
37	"Without You"	Johnny Tillotson
38	"Wings of a Dove"	Ferlin Husky
39	"Little Sister"	Elvis Presley
40	"Blue Moon"	The Marcels
41	"Daddy's Home"	Shep and the Limelites
42	"This Time"	Troy Shondell
43	"(I Don't Know Why) But I Do"	Clarence "Frogman" Henry
44	"Asia Minor"	Kokomo
45	"Hello Walls"	Faron Young
46	"Runaround Sue"	Dion
47	"Yellow Bird"	Arthur Lyman
48	"Hurt"	Timi Yuro
49	"Hello Mary Lou"	Ricky Nelson
50	"There's a Moon Out Tonight"	The Capris
51	"Surrender"	Elvis Presley
52	"I Love How You Love Me"	The Paris Sisters
53	"Ya Ya"	Lee Dorsey
54	"School Is Out"	Gary U.S. Bonds
55	"Mexico"	Bob Moore
56	"You Don't Know What You've Got (Until You Lose It)"	Ral Donner
57	"Walk Right Back"	The Everly Brothers
58	"The Way You Look Tonight"	The Lettermen
59	"Moody River"	Pat Boone
60	"One Mint Julep"	Ray Charles
61	"Take Good Care of Her"	Adam Wade
62	"Gee Whiz (Look at His Eyes)"	Carla Thomas
63	"Stand by Me"	Ben E. King
64	"Spanish Harlem"	Ben E. King
65	"It's Gonna Work Out Fine"	Ike & Tina Turner
66	"Baby Blue"	The Echoes
67	"Baby Sittin' Boogie"	Buzz Clifford
68	"Hats Off to Larry"	Del Shannon
69	"Those Oldies but Goodies"	Little Caesar & the Romans
70	"The Fly"	Chubby Checker
71	"(Marie's the Name) His Latest Flame"	Elvis Presley
72	"Wonderland by Night"	Bert Kaempfert
73	"Bless You"	Tony Orlando
74	"I've Told Every Little Star"	Linda Scott
75	"One Track Mind"	Bobby Lewis
76	"Angel Baby"	Rosie and the Originals
77	"Pretty Little Angel Eyes"	Curtis Lee
78	"Think Twice"	Brook Benton
79	"Does Your Chewing Gum Lose Its Flavour (On the Bedpost Overnight?)"	Lonnie Donegan
80	"Breakin' in a Brand New Broken Heart"	Connie Francis
81	"Mama Said"	The Shirelles
82	"Let the Four Winds Blow"	Fats Domino
83	"The Writing on the Wall"	Adam Wade
84	"My Kind of Girl"	Matt Monro
85	"Tonight My Love, Tonight"	Paul Anka
86	"San Antonio Rose"	Floyd Cramer
87	"Big Bad John"	Jimmy Dean
88	"Good Time Baby"	Bobby Rydell
89	"Rubber Ball"	Bobby Vee
90	"Missing You"	Ray Peterson
91	"Dum Dum"	Brenda Lee
92	"I'm Gonna Knock on Your Door"	Eddie Hodges
93	"You Can Depend on Me"	Brenda Lee
94	"Let's Twist Again"	Chubby Checker
95	"Take Five"	The Dave Brubeck Quartet
96	"Are You Lonesome Tonight?"	Elvis Presley
97	"Sea of Heartbreak"	Don Gibson
98	"More Money for You and Me"	The Four Preps
99	"You Must Have Been a Beautiful Baby"	Bobby Darin
100	"Please Stay"	The Drifters

== See also ==
- 1961 in music
- List of Billboard Hot 100 number-one singles of 1961
- List of Billboard Hot 100 top-ten singles in 1961
