= Caravan of Stars =

Rock and roll, R&B concert tour

In 1959, radio and television personality and television producer Dick Clark organized and produced a concert tour of rock and roll and rhythm and blues artists, many of whom had appeared on his music performance and dance television program, American Bandstand. The show was billed as Dick Clark's Caravan of Stars. Its success prompted additional tours. The last of the concerts toured in 1966.

== Origin and structure ==
Dick Clark observed that in the late 1950s, rock and roll had little acceptance as a form of live entertainment. Seeing an opportunity, he formed the Caravan of Stars, which, during its seven-year existence grew to gross nearly $5 million annually (more than $45 million in 2021 dollars).

The concert promoted up to seventeen acts, each performing two or three songs, all backed by the same band. In the beginning, admission was $1.50 ($13.50 in 2021). By 1965 the price had risen to $2.50 ($22.50 in 2021).

The summer tour went out from Memorial Day to Labor Day, sixty to ninety days on the road, nonstop. Tours were added throughout the other seasons.

== Headliners ==
The show always spotlighted a major artist, who closed the show, like Gene Pitney, Bobby Vee or Paul Anka.

Other artists included Jewel Akens, Freddie Cannon, Brian Hyland, Little Eva, Lloyd Price, Linda Scott, and Johnny Tillotson,

Groups included The Coasters, The Crystals, The Drifters, The Premiers, The Skyliners, and The Supremes.

== Reception ==
The August 30, 1959, concert at the Hollywood Bowl in Hollywood, California, reflected the early success of the Caravan. The performance set an all-time attendance record at the Bowl, with more than 5,000 being turned away. Variety reported that police set up loudspeakers six blocks away to tell people the show was sold out.

A week later, at the Michigan State Fair, the show set another attendance record, surpassing the previous attendance record by more than 15,000 concert goers over the previous record in the 110-year history of the fair.

== Legacy ==
In 1978, in a commemorative piece on the 25th anniversary of the birth of rock and roll, Clark recalled the Caravan days, commenting that today's artists:

are cosmopolitan and sophisticated compared to the grandfathers of rock‘n’roll. The Old Dick Clark Caravan of Stars rock’n’roll bus tour with 17 acts played one and two shows nightly for 60 to 90 days in a row. The show ran four hours in a 2,000 or 3,000 seat gymnasium or abandoned vaudeville house. It's difficult to think of those as the ‘good ol’ days.’ Compare it to private jet airliner travel for a group and its entourage. They play 18,000 seat arenas and are joined by an army of roadies and trailer trucks with hundreds of thousands of dollars worth of equipment. Those old days on the road remind me of veterans reflecting on any war. The stories always sound glamorous and full of fun. It wasn’t all fun & games. It was tough work.

== Rosters ==
Except where noted, the following lineups are taken from concert posters promoting the Caravan in various cities throughout the United States. The popularity of the shows led to the production of multiple units traveling the country.

August 1959

- Frankie Avalon
- Annette
- Anita Bryant
- Dodie Stevens
- Skip & Flip
- The Strangers
- Duane Eddy
- Freddie Cannon
- Jan and Dean
- Bobby Rydell
- Jack Scott
- Ray Sharpe
- Jerry Wallace
- The Young Lions

October 1959 (Canton, Ohio)

- Paul Anka
- Lloyd Price
- Annette
- Duane Eddy
- Jimmy Clanton
- LaVern Baker
- The Coasters
- The Drifters
- The Skyliners
- Bobby Rydell
- The Jordan Brothers
- Phil Phillips
- Lloyd Price and His Caravan of Stars Orch

Spring 1961

- Jan & Dean
- Freddie Cannon
- Johnny Burnette
- Gary U.S. Bonds
- Danny & The Juniors
- The Earls
- The Fabulous Four
- The Five Satins
- The Four Sportsmen
- Dick Lee
- Bobby Lewis
- Little Caesar & the Romans
- The Mello Kings
- The Miller Sisters
- The Olympics
- The Doc Bagby Big Beat Orch

Summer 1961

- Chubby Checker
- Jan & Dean
- Bobby Rydell
- Freddie Cannon
- Frankie Avalon
- Mike Clifford
- Gary U.S. Bonds
- The Shirelles
- Johnny & The Hurricanes
- Chuck Jackson
- Dodie Stevens
- Bobby Lewis
- Jo Ann Campbell

Fall 1961 (Milwaukee)

- Paul Anka
- Chubby Checker
- Linda Scott
- Duane Eddy
- Clarence "Frogman" Henry
- The Shirelles
- The Jive Five
- The Caravan of Stars Orch

Fall 1963

- Bobby Vee
- Brian Hyland
- Jimmy Clanton
- Linda Scott
- The Essex
- The Jaynettes
- The Ronettes
- Little Eva
- The Dixie Belles
- Dale & Grace
- Joe Perkins
- Donald Jenkins & The Delighters
- The Dovells
- Paul & Paula
- The Tymes
- Jeff Condon
- Myron Lee & His Orch

Summer 1964

- Gene Pitney
- The Dixie Cups
- Dean & Jean
- Mike Clifford
- The Rip Chords
- The Coasters
- Brenda Holloway
- The Crystals
- Brian Hyland
- The Kasuals
- Major Lance
- Donna Loren
- George McCannon
- The Reflections
- Round Robin
- The Shirelles
- The Supremes

Fall 1964 (Conneaut Lake Park, Pennsylvania)

- Gene Pitney
- Bobby Rydell
- Paul Anka
- Neil Sedaka
- Sue Thompson
- Sam Cooke
- The Crystals
- Del Shannon
- Connie Francis
- Ral Donner
- The Teddy Bears
- Buzz Clifford
- Johnny Preston
- Gene Chandler
- Conway Twitty

Fall 1964 (Worcester, Massachusetts)

- Johnny Tillotson
- The Drifters
- The Supremes
- Brian Hyland
- Bobby Freeman
- The Hondells
- The Crystals
- Dee Dee Sharp
- Sonny Knight
- Mike Clifford
- The Velvelettes
- Lou Christie
- Jimmy Ford & The Chicago Casuals
- Little Al Guitar

April 1965

- The Shangri-Las
- The Larks
- The Hondells
- Dion
- Dee Dee Sharp
- Reparata & The Delrons
- Mel Carter
- Mickey Rooney Jr.

April 1965

- Bobby Goldsboro
- Gene Pitney
- Tim Tormey
- Chad and Jeremy
- Vic Dana
- Bill Black's Combo
- The Reasons
- Darin D’Anna
- Gary Lewis & The Playboys
- The Crystals
- The Reflections
- The Rag Dolls
- Brian Hyland
- Ronnie Cochran
- Susan Wayne

May 1965 (Bluefield, West Virginia)

- Bobby Vee
- Herman's Hermits
- Little Anthony & The Imperials
- The Ikettes
- Freddie Cannon
- Bobby Freeman
- Brenda Holloway
- The Detergents
- Round Robin
- The Hondells
- Reparata & The Delrons
- Billy Stewart
- George McCannon III
- Myron Lee & The Caddies
- Little Jr. Mann

August 1965 (Conneaut Lake, Pennsylvania)

- Peter & Gordon
- Tom Jones
- The Shirelles
- Them
- Ronnie Dove
- Mel Carter
- Brian Hyland
- Billy Joe Royal
- George McCannon
- Jimmy Rice
- Jimmy Ford's Executives
- Timothy Wilson

November 1965

- Paul Revere & The Raiders
- The Byrds
- We Five
- Bo Diddley
- The Dutchess
- Dale Wright & The Wright Guys
- Men of Action
- The Results
- The Rolling Stones (Pittsburgh only)

August 1966

- The Happenings
- Mitch Ryder
- Capitols
- Strangeloves
- Thomas Group
- Keith Allison
- Dean Parrish
- Cash McCall
- Lou Christie

October 1966

- Gary Lewis & The Playboys
- Sam the Sham & The Pharaohs
- The Yardbirds
- Distant Cousins
- Bobby Hebb
- Brian Hyland
