= Hutch Davie =

American musician (1930–2020)

Background information
- Also known as: Bob "Hutch" Davie, Bun Davie, Budd McCoy, Clint Harmon, Chuck Harmon
- Born: Robert Bunyan Davie III; August 4, 1930; Birmingham, Alabama, U.S.
- Died: April 7, 2020 (aged 89) West Orange, New Jersey, U.S.
- Occupations: Songwriter; record producer

Robert Bunyan Davie III (August 4, 1930 – April 7, 2020), professionally known as Hutch Davie, or Bob "Hutch" Davie, and sometimes credited as Bun Davie, Budd McCoy, Clint Harmon or Chuck Harmon, was an American orchestra leader, arranger, pianist, and composer of popular music. He composed the song "Green Door", and led the orchestra which backed Jim Lowe on the best-selling version of the song in 1956.

== Early life and education ==
Davie was born in Birmingham, Alabama, the only child of Bunyan Davie Jr. and Louise McCoy. He was a musical prodigy and taught himself to play the piano by the age of four. He had perfect pitch and expressed his distaste for music that was not in tune while still too young to articulate what was wrong with it. At the age of five he started attending the Birmingham Conservatory of Music. After high school, he attended Louisiana State University but refused to comply with a sports requirement and dropped out after a year.

== Career ==
He moved to New York City and started working for NBC at the age of 20. He married a model, Mary Elizabeth Pfaff, and entered the music business. His first big success was the song "Green Door" in 1956, which he composed and arranged, and on which he played piano. The record achieved BMI Million-air status (a million radio and television performances in the United States). In 1958 Davie had a No. 51 chart hit, as "Hutch Davie and his Honky Tonkers", with his version of Woody Herman's "Woodchopper's Ball". As a pianist he recorded jazz standards with the Honky Tonkers, and an album featuring his solo playing, Piano Memories, was also issued in 1958. In 1959, with record producer Bob Crewe, Davie arranged Santo & Johnny's instrumental hit "Sleep Walk".

He produced and arranged Linda Scott's three big hits on Canadian-American Records: "I've Told Ev'ry Little Star", "Don't Bet Money Honey", and "I Don't Know Why". He also produced and arranged the Angels' "Till" and "Cry Baby Cry" and James Ray's "If You Gotta Make a Fool of Somebody" on Caprice Records, a subsidiary of Canadian-American. As a songwriter, record producer and director of A&R, he also worked with such artists as Shirley Ellis, Patty Duke, Lesley Gore, Ellie Greenwich, and Frankie Valli and the Four Seasons. He was the arranger on the original Bob Crewe Generation hit recording of "Music to Watch Girls By" in 1967, for which he was nominated for a Grammy. He also worked with Oliver on the songs "Good Morning Starshine" and "Jean", The Shirelles, and Mitch Ryder and the Detroit Wheels, among many others.

In 1974, he moved to Scotch Plains, New Jersey, with his wife and son.

Davie died on April 7, 2020, in West Orange, New Jersey, at age 89.

== Works ==
=== 1956 ===
- "By You, By You, By You," Jim Lowe with the Bob Davie Piano and Orchestra (Davie - Marvin Moore)
- "Corn Poem," Bob Davie (Davie)
- "Dixieland Roll," Martha Carson (Davie - Grean)
- "The Green Door," Jim Lowe with The High Fives (Davie - Moore)
- "Honestly, Honestly," The Gayden Sisters (March 1956)
- "I Feel The Beat," Jim Lowe with the Bob Davie Piano and Orchestra (Davie - Moore)
- "(I Wish I Had A Dog Like) Rin Tin Tin," The Sandpipers (Davie - Grean)
- "Just Love Me," Jaye P. Morgan (Davie - Moore)
- "Moon Pearls," Bob Davie (Davie)
- "(The Story Of) The Little Man In Chinatown," Jim Lowe with The High Fives (Davie) (B side of "The Green Door")

=== 1957 ===
- "Billy Boy, Billy Boy," Janis Martin (Davie - Moore)
- "The Bright Light," Jim Lowe with the Bob Davie Orchestra (Moore - Davie)
- "Highway!," (1957) with Marvin Moore
- "I Ain’t Goin’ There No More," David Houston (Davie - Moore)
- "I Don't Love You No More" (1957) with Marvin Moore
- "Love And Kisses," Janis Martin (Moore - Davie - Grean)
- "A Million Teardrops," The Bachelors (Miller - Davie)
- "My Confession," Janis Martin (Moore - Davie - Grean)
- "Oh-Oh-Baby!," Jim Lowe (Davie - Moore)
- "Piano Roll Pete," Jim Lowe (Davie - Moore)
- "Puppet In Paris," Bob Davie and his Orchestra (Davie - Moore)
- "Rock And Roll Rhapsody," Pat O'Day (Davie - Moore)
- "Rooftops Of Rome," Bob Davie, His Orchestra and Chorus (Davie - Moore)
- "Slow Train," Jim Lowe (Davie - Moore)
- "The Song You Heard When You Fell In Love," Betty Johnson (Davie - Moore)
- "That Kind Of Love," Bob Lee (Davie - Moore)
- "What's Behind That Strange Door," Mitchell Torok (Moore - Davie - Reid)
- "Why Did You Break My Heart?," Ted Newman (Davie - Moore)

=== 1958 ===
- "Annabelle," Dean Reed (Davie - Moore)
- "Cool It, Baby," Jimmy Dell (Davie - Moore)
- "Dear 53310761," The Threeteens (Moore - Davie)
- "Doowaddie," The Threeteens (Moore - Davie)
- "Gwendolyn And The Werewolf," Hutch Davie And His Honky Tonkers (Davie)
- "Honky Tonk Train," Hutch Davie And His Honky Tonkers (Meade Lux Lewis)
- "Honolulu Holiday" (Davie)
- "The Hoobaschnob Machine," Rollo And Bolliver (Moore - Davie) as "Bob Davis"
- "Hoopa Hoola (With A Hula-Hoop)," Betty Johnson (Grean - Davie)
- "How Much," Betty Johnson (Moore - Davie)
- "In The Mood," Hutch Davie And His Honky Tonkers (Garland - Razaf)
- "Just Look, Don't Touch, She's Mine," Milton Allen (Harper - Davie - Moore)
- "The Ladder Of Love" (Moore - Davie)
- "The Look," Gary Trexler (Schuster - Davie - Moore)
- "Mildred, Our Choir Director," Rollo And Bolliver (Moore - Davie) as "Bob Davis"
- "One More Time," Betty Johnson (Davie - Moore)
- "The Restless Sea," Sue Raney (Davie - Moore)
- "There's Never Been A Night," Betty Johnson (Schuster - Davie)
- "Turtle Dovin'," The School Belles (Davie - Moore) sung by Marvin Moore's two daughters
- "Waitin' For My Date," The School Belles (Davie - Moore)
- "Woodchopper's Ball," Hutch Davie And His Honky Tonkers (Herman - Bishop)
- "The Year Of Our Love," Tommy Leonetti (Moore - Davie)

=== 1959 ===
- "The Emperor's Nightingale," Bob Lin Wu And His Orchestra (Davie)
- "Lantern Street," Bob Lin Wu And His Orchestra (Davie)
- "Rickshaw," Bob Lin Wu And His Orchestra (Davie)
- "Shanghai Doll," Bob Lin Wu And His Orchestra (Davie)
- "Be My Steady (Clementine)," Eddie Cooley and The Dimples (Schuster - Davie)
- "Begin The Beguine," Hutch Davie And His Honky Tonkers
- "Boppin' on the Beach (1959)
- "The Count of Monte Christo" (1959) with Marvin Moore
- "The Count-Down Game," The School Belles (Moore - Davie)
- "The Dipsy Doodle," Hutch Davie And His Honky Tonkers
- "Fast Freight" (1959)
- "He Laid Poor Jesse in His Grave" (1959) with Joe Csida
- "Heartaches," Hutch Davie And His Honky Tonkers
- "Hiawatha" (1959)
- "Lucky 15" with Marvin Moore
- "Lucky 16" (1959) with Marvin Moore and Johnny Hicks
- "The Midnight Ride of Paul Revere" (1959)
- "Moonlight Cha Cha Cha" (1959)
- "Potrzebie" (1959) with Marvin Moore
- "Princess"(1959) with Irwin Schuster
- "Ramar of the Jungle' (1959) with Marvin Moore and Joe Csida
- "Rock and Roll Party" (1959)
- "Rockin' One Up a Storm" (1959)
- "String Along with Pal-O-Mine" (1959) with John J. Reynolds and Bill Buchanan
- "Suntan Tattoo" with Marvin Moore
- "Sweet Georgia Brown," Hutch Davie And His Honky Tonkers
- "Swing-Swang," The School Belles (Moore - Davie)
- "They Called Me Captain Kidd" (1959) with Joe Csida
- "What's The Good (Of All This Love)" (1959) with Marvin Moore

=== 1960 ===
- "Don't You Cry" (1960) with Irwin Schuster
- "Double Date" (1960) with Marvin Moore
- "Chestnut Drive" (1960) Instrumental, played by Clyde Gary And His Orchestra
- "The Bells" (1960) words by Edgar Allan Poe
- "Johnny On the Spot" (1960) with Irwin Schuster
- "Plant a Little Kiss" (1960) with Rose Burton and Irwin Schuster
- "The Raven" (1960) words by Edgar Allan Poe
- "The Story of Jesse James" (1960) with Joe Csida & Irwin Schuster
- "Yes You Are" (1960) with Irwin Schuster

=== 1961 ===
- "Birmingham" (1961) as Hutch Davie
- "Awake, My Charity (1961) with Marvin Moore
- "Christmas Day" (1961) as Hutch Davie, with George Weiss
- "Daddy, Daddy (Gotta Get a Phone in My Room)" (1961) with Betsy Brye
- "Hop Scotch" (1961)
- "It's All Because" (1961) words and music by Hutch Davie
- "The Land of Stars" (1961) with George Weiss
- "The Sacred Guest" (1961) with Marvin Moore
- "Since I Met You" (1961) as Hutch Davie
- "Starlight Starbright" (1961) with lyrics by George Weiss
- "Rhythm In My Heart" (undated) lyrics by Marvin Moore
- "A Wicked World" (1961) with Marvin Moore

=== 1962 ===
- "The Dance is Over" (1962) as Chuck Harmon
- "Long and Lonely Night" (1962) as C. Harmon, with G. Weiss and N. Parrel, pseudonym of Neil Galligan
- "That's All I Ask of You" (1962) as Chuck Harmon
- Come On In (1962) Santo & Johnny LP arranged and conducted by

=== 1963 ===
- "I Know It, You Know It," Linda Scott (Davie - Clark)
- "Let's Fall In Love," Linda Scott (Koehler - Arlen) as arranger
- "The Nitty Gritty" / "Give Me A List" - Shirley Ellis with the Hutch Davie Orch. & Chorus (October 1963)

=== 1964 ===
- "The Happy Banjo" (Davie) / "Sunday Morning" (Davie) - The Hutch Davie Orchestra

=== 1965 ===
- "Five Different Girls" (R. Alfred - H. Davie) / "Move" (R. Alfred - H. Davie) - Patrick (October 1965)

=== 1966 ===
- "East Is East Pt. 1" / "East Is East Pt. 2" - Hutch Davie (1966)
- "One Of Those Songs" / "Cute Thing" (Davie) - Hutch Davie And The Chosen Few (1966)
- "California Nights" (arranger) - Lesley Gore (December 1966)
- "Music To Watch Girls By" (arranger) / "Girls On The Rocks" (B. Crewe - H. Davie) - The Bob Crewe Generation (December 1966)

=== 1967 ===
- "Theme For A Lazy Girl" (B. Crewe - H. Davie) - The Bob Crewe Generation (January 1967)
- "Miniskirts In Moscow Or..." (B. Crewe - H. Davie) - The Bob Crewe Generation (April 1967)
- "Never My Love" / "A Lover's Concerto" - The Hutch Davie Convention (December 1967)

=== 1968 ===
- "Soul Mexico" (H. Davie - R. Ray - B. Cruz) - Ricardo Ray Orchestra (1968)
- "Birds Of Britain" (Crewe - Davie) - The Bob Crewe Generation (March 1968)
- "Chelsea Girls" (Crewe - Davie) - The Bob Crewe Generation (March 1968)
- "Clementine Boo-ga-loo" (Crewe - Davie) - The Bob Crewe Generation (March 1968)
- "Streetcar" (Crewe - Davie) - The Bob Crewe Generation (March 1968)

=== 1969 ===
- "American Moon" - Bobby Dimple, The Lunar Ladies Chorus, The Lipple Kutie Kids and The Hutch Davie Diggers Band (1969)
- "St. Mark's Place" (Crewe - Davie) - Darvana Payne, The Lunar Ladies Chorus and The Hutch Davie Diggers Band
- "Why Doesn't Love Make Me Happy" (Crewe - Davie) / "Tomorrow's Children" - Lesley Gore (December 1969)

=== 1970 ===
- "When Yesterday Was Tomorrow" / "Why Me, Why You" (Crewe - Davie) - Lesley Gore (May 1970)

== Discography ==
- Much Hutch (1958) as "Hutch Davie (& His Honky Tonkers)"
