= Ralf Bendix discography =

This discography gives an overview of the records published by the German Schlager singer Ralf Bendix.

== Singles ==
Title	Catalog nbr	Issued
	Electrola	
Sie hieß Mary Ann / Minne Minne Haha	8579	3/1956
Hotel zur Einsamkeit / Du hast Dich nicht einmal umgesehn	8609	9/1956
So geht das jede Nacht / Minne Minne Haha	8616	9/1956
Hey Joe / 99 Jahr’ geht meine Post jetzt nach Sing-Sing	8646	2/1957
Heute geh ich nicht nach Hause / Du bist ja so schön	8699	8/1957
Ralf Bendix Singt Rock 'n' Roll / Ich liebe ein hässliches Mädchen	8700	8/1957
Warum müssen Jahre vergeh’n? / Im Goldenen Anker zu Liverpool	8701	8/1957
Du schwarze Madonna / Toby	8729	9/1957
Wo meine Sonne scheint / Wir bauen die Straße nach Kingston-Town	8758	11/1957
Buona Sera / Wir fahr’n nach San Fernando	8770	11/1957
Nathan der Friedensrichter / Sputnik Rock	8787	1/1958
At The Hop / Küsse süßer als Wein	8794	1/1958
Bambina / Piccolina	20922	5/1958
Come Prima / O Mama mia	21014	10/1958
Die Sonne aus Andalucia / The Ways Of Love	21049	4/1959
Tschau tschau Bambina / Trinidad	21150	4/1959
Edelstein It’s Only Make Believe / Addios Muchachos	21223	6/1959
Bei mir bist du schön / Armer Gigolo	21234	7/1959
Kannst du pfeifen Johanna / Einsamer Sonntag	21277	9/1959
Kriminal-Tango / Pity-Pity Foxtrott	21309	11/1959
Mona Lisa / Glencannon Song	21387	2/1960
Wir bauen die Straße nach Kingston-Town / Sheriff Brown	21439	3/1960
La Bella / Oh, oh Rosi	21440	3/1960
Das ging nochmal gut / Venus Walzer	21609	8/1960
Weit von Alaska / Schau dich nicht um	21660	12/1960
Der rote Tango / Kannst du pfeifen Johanna?	21797	2/1961
Babysitter-Boogie / Sonne, Mond und Sterne	21804*	3/1961
My Ol’ Time Banjo / Ich muß dich wiederseh’n	21971*	10/1961
Spanische Hochzeit / Das Neueste aus Paris	22007*	1/1962
Striptease-Susi / Mama, hol’ den Hammer	22019*	12/1961
Venus Walzer / Warum müssen die Jahre vergeh’n	22035	4/1962
Die große Nummer wird gemacht / Wenn die Zicke-Zacke-Zuckerpuppen tanzen geh’n	22194*	5/1962
Auf Glühendem Pflaster / Liebe Fängt Mit Träumen	22195	7/1962
Babysitter Twist / Wo ist denn das Kätzchen	22300	10/1962
Schön wird die Welt / Kokusnuß und Ananas	22411	5/1963
Der große Treck nach Idaho / Meine Braut ist bei der Feuerwehr	22478	7/1963
Madame Goulou / Didy-Song (& Gisela Jonas)	22517	9/1963
Die Straße des Lebens / Der Teufel	22537	9/1963
Weil du ja zu mir sagst / Der Weg der Barmherzigkeit	22538	9/1963
Mohikana / Die Geschichte vom Sunnyboy	22598	11/1963
Schaffe, schaffe Häusle baue / Hoppe, hoppe Reiter	22700	5/1964
Unser Papa hat kein Geld / Senor Ping-Pong	22782	10/1964
Heimatland / Überall dasselbe Lied	22865	2/1965
Zwei Zigaretten / Die Liebe ist ein Wildwestfilm	22957	6/1965
Der schwarze Koffer / Sag mir deine Sorgen	23081	11/1965
Suchst du die Liebe oder nur Amore / Mexikanische Trompeten	23111	12/1965
Bombending / Darling, du mußt nicht traurig sein	23224	10/1966
Ich hör’ die Trommel rufen / Menschen wie du	23398	1966
Aber du in deinem Himmelbett / Menschen wie du	23486	9/1967
	Columbia	
Mamatschi / Weihnachtszeit – Kinderzeit	23646	12/1967
Blau wie das Meer / Schön war der Abend mit dir	23729	3/1968
Zeinerling / Uschi-Wuschi	28733	1970
Weiter oben / Du sollst mich nicht belügen	28779	1970
Tumba Tumbala / Vergiß nicht zu lächeln	29989	1972
100 bunte Bänder / Schenk Deiner Frau doch hin und wieder rote Rosen	30459	1973
Glücklich ist, wer vergißt / Hollidi-Hollido	30546	1974
Unser Lehrer ist Verliebt / Nostalgie	31306	1975
Maria Helen / Tom Dooley	31482	1976
Heut ist Marie ein Star / Big Bad John	32590	1977
Mein Freund Meier, mein Freund Lehmann und auch ich / Das ist bestimmt geflunkert	32956	1978
Ich schaff' die Kohlen schon an / Wir lassen das Licht an	45630	1979
Gott sei Dank ist sie schlank / Solang’ bei uns ’ne Knospe sprießt	1469947	1984

* Columbia

== Longplayings ==
Title	Label	Issued
Vinyl		
Auf Wiedersehn	Capitol 10197	1958
Ralf Bendix – Singt Evergreens	MFP 5149	1965
Besonders wertvoll	Columbia 28002	1969
Vergiß nicht zu lächeln	Electrola	1973
Western Party	EMI	1974
Ralf Bendix – Singt Rock And Roll	Bear Family 15078	1981
CD		
Durch die Jahre	Bear Family 15795	2000
Die goldenen Zeiten	ZYX 12008	2010
Babysitter-Boogie - 50 große Erfolge	Music Tales	2012
Große Erfolge & Evergreens	Electrola 30410	2014
Babysitter Boogie	LaserLight	2014

== Bibliography ==
- Angelika und Lothar Binding: Der große Binding Single Katalog, Volume 1, ISBN 978-3980471022, self edited 1994, (pp. 55).
