= Baby blue (disambiguation) =

Baby blue is a color.

Baby blue may also refer to:

== Music ==
=== Songs ===
- "Baby Blue" (The Echoes song), a 1961 song by The Echoes
- "It's All Over Now, Baby Blue", a 1965 song by Bob Dylan
- "Baby Blue" (Badfinger song), a 1971 song by Badfinger
- "Baby Blue" (Cody Simpson song), a 2026 song by Cody Simpson
- "Baby Blue" (King Krule song), a 2013 song by King Krule
- "Baby Blue", a 1979 song by the Beach Boys from the 1979 album L.A. (Light Album)
- "Baby Blue", a 1985 song by Đorđe Balašević from his album 003
- "Baby Blue" (George Strait song), a 1988 song by George Strait
- "Baby Blue" (Emilíana Torrini song), a 1999 song by Emilíana Torrini
- "Baby Blue" (Action Bronson song), a 2015 song by Action Bronson featuring Chance the Rapper
- "Baby Blue", a 1976 song by Chilliwack
- "Baby Blue", a 2024 song by Cindy Lee from the 2024 album Diamond Jubilee
- "Baby Blue", a 2015 song by Deafheaven from the 2015 album New Bermuda
- "Baby Blue", a 1979 song by Dusty Springfield
- "Baby Blue", a 1996 song by Fishmans
- "Baby Blue", a 1958 song by Gene Vincent
- "Baby Blue", a 1974 song by George Baker Selection
- "Baby Blue!" a 2004 song by Halcali from the 2004 album Ongaku no Susume
- "Baby Blue", a 2021 song by Luke Hemmings from When Facing the Things We Turn Away From
- "Baby Blue", a 2008 song by Martina Topley-Bird
- "Baby Blue", a 2011 song by Scanners
- "Baby Blue", a 1979 song by The Teens
- "Baby Blue", a 2002 song by The Warlocks

=== Other uses in music ===
- Baby Blue (rapper), female rapper from London
- Ala Diamond "Baby Blue" Smith, a member of Pretty Ricky
- Baby Blue, an alias for Tin Tin Out
- Baby Blue (Anahí album), a 2000 album by Anahí
- Baby Blue (Mary Lou Lord album), a 2004 album by Mary Lou Lord
- Baby Blue (group), a Filipino idol group

== Other uses ==
- Baby Blue's Manual of Legal Citation, a free content version of the Bluebook system of legal citation
- The Baby Blue Movie, a Canadian programming block on Citytv
- "Baby Blue", an episode of American TV drama series Person of Interest season 1
- Baby Blue, a short animation by Shinichiro Watanabe in the anthology Genius Party
- Baby Blue, a Z80 co-processor card developed and marketed by Xedex Corporation
- Baby Blue, an autonomous division in the history of IBM
- Baby Blue (2001 film), an English-language Dutch thriller film
- Baby Blue (2023 film), an American supernatural horror film

== See also ==
- Baby blues (disambiguation)
- Blue baby
- Nemophila menziesii, a blue-flowered plant, known commonly as baby blue eyes or baby's-blue-eyes
