= Caravan (Juan Tizol and Duke Ellington song) =

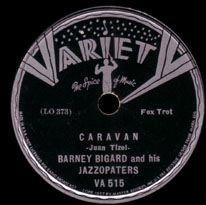
- "Caravan" on Variety

Single by Barney Bigard and His Jazzopators
- Published: 1936 by Exclusive Music
- Released: 1936
- Genre: Jazz
- Composers: Juan Tizol, Duke Ellington
- Lyricist: Irving Mills

"Caravan" is an American jazz standard by Juan Tizol and Duke Ellington, first performed by Ellington in 1936. Irving Mills wrote lyrics, but they are rarely sung.

== Original recording ==
The first version of the song was recorded in Hollywood in 1936 and performed as an instrumental by Barney Bigard and His Jazzopators. Two takes were recorded for Variety label, of which the first was issued as a 78 record (Variety VA-515-1) in 1937. The band members were:

- Cootie Williams – trumpet
- Juan Tizol – trombone
- Barney Bigard – clarinet
- Harry Carney – baritone saxophone
- Duke Ellington – piano
- Billy Taylor – double bass
- Sonny Greer – drums

The musicians were members of the Duke Ellington Orchestra, which often split into smaller combinations to record songs under different band names. For this recording, which included Ellington and Tizol as performers, the nominal session band leader was Bigard. As of 2024 this is the most covered song in history, with over 500 versions published.

First measures of Caravan

== Other well-known versions ==
The sound of "Caravan" appealed to exotica musicians; Martin Denny, Arthur Lyman and Gordon Jenkins all covered it. The Mills Brothers recorded an a cappella version of the song. More than 350 versions have been recorded.

- Santo & Johnny's – Santo & Johnny (1959), peaked at number 48 on the Billboard Hot 100 chart

== In popular culture ==
- An arrangement of the song for big band features in the soundtrack of the 2014 film Whiplash, as an important plot element.
- The track "You're Probably Wondering Why I'm Here", from the Frank Zappa and The Mothers of Invention debut album "Freak Out!", features the comedic line: "I wanna hear Caravan with a drum solo!"

== See also ==
- List of 1930s jazz standards
