= Don't Bet Money Honey =

Single by Linda Scott
- B-side: "Starlight, Starbright"
- Released: July 1961
- Genre: Pop
- Length: 2:20
- Label: Canadian-American
- Songwriter(s): Linda Scott
- Producer(s): Hutch Davie

Linda Scott singles chronology
"I've Told Ev'ry Little Star" (1961)	"Don't Bet Money Honey" (1961)	"I Don't Know Why" (1961)

"Don't Bet Money Honey" is a song written and performed by Linda Scott. It reached #3 on the US adult contemporary chart, #9 on the Billboard Hot 100, and #50 on the UK Singles Chart in 1961.

The song was produced and arranged by Hutch Davie.

The single ranked #36 on Billboard's Year-End Hot 100 singles of 1961.

The B-side to the single, "Starlight, Starbright", reached #44 on the Billboard chart.

== Other versions ==
- Ray Ellis and His Orchestra released a version of the song on their 1961 album, Ray Ellis Plays the Top 20.
