= Santo & Johnny (album) =

Studio album by Santo & Johnny
- Released: 1959
- Genre: Instrumental
- Length: 26:52
- Label: Canadian-American

Santo & Johnny chronology
Santo & Johnny (1959)	Encore (1960)

Santo & Johnny is the debut album by the eponymous duo, released in 1959. The album includes the duo's best known instrumental, "Sleep Walk".

== Release ==
Canadian-American Records distributed the album in Canada in 1959, and the label Orfeón released it in Venezuela the same year.

== Singles ==
The track "Sleep Walk" rose to number 1 of the Billboard Hot 100 in 1959. The band's rendition of "Caravan" entered the charts in 1960 and it peaked at number 48.

== Performances ==
The instrumentals "All Night Diner" and "Sleep Walk" were performed on The Perry Como Show in 1959. "Sleep Walk" was also performed on American Bandstand.

== Legacy ==
"Sleep Walk" has been frequently used in commercials, TV shows, and movies, including La Bamba and Heroes. The recording of "Caravan" from this album was used in the movie Breakfast on Pluto.

== Track listing ==
Side one

1. "Caravan"
2. "Summertime"
3. "All Night Diner"
4. "Blue Moon"
5. "School Day"
6. "Sleep Walk"

Side two

1. "Tenderly"
2. "Slave Girl"
3. "Dream"
4. "Canadian Sunset"
5. "Harbor Lights"
6. "Raunchy"

== Personnel ==
- Santo Farina – steel guitar
- Johnny Farina – guitar
- Mike Dee – drums
- Bob Davie – conductor, arrangement
