= Robin Clark (pop singer) =

American pop singer (born 1949)

Background information
- Born: Sharon Ilo Hershiser; September 21, 1949 (age 77); Tuscaloosa, Alabama, U.S.
- Genre: Pop
- Occupation: Singer
- Instrument: Vocals
- Years active: 1960–1962
- Label: Capitol (1960–1962)

Robin Clark (born Sharon Ilo Hershiser on September 21, 1949) is an American pop singer who released four singles on Capitol Records in 1961 and 1962, and was at one time the youngest artist signed to a major record label in the United States. Clark's best known recording was her debut single, the novelty song "Daddy, Daddy (Gotta Get a Phone in My Room)", which was released on January 9, 1961, and reached No. 1 on radio station WHYN in Springfield, Massachusetts, on March 4, 1961, before it "bubbled under" at No. 120 on the Billboard Hot 100 on March 13, 1961.

== Early life ==
Sharon Ilo Hershiser was born on September 21, 1949, on the campus of the University of Alabama in Tuscaloosa, where her parents, Charles Arthur "Charlie" Hershiser (born February 5, 1925, in Akron, Ohio; died December 23, 1999, in Foley, Alabama), a political science major, and his wife, Barbara A. Hines (born June 21, 1928), were both students. Clark is the younger sister of Charles Arthur "Chuck" Hershiser, Jr. (born April 26, 1948), and the granddaughter of pioneer television hostess and cook Caroline Ilo Burchfield Hines Salyer (born in Loudon, Tennessee on February 17, 1902; died 1995 in Largo, Florida), who (as Ilo Salyer) hosted a 30-minute program Memo from Ilo five days a week on WJHL-TV in Johnson City, Tennessee from 1957 to 1966. Salyer was also a noted whistler who toured the churches of East Tennessee imitating birds and accompanied by the piano.

After his graduation from the University of Alabama in 1951, Charles Hershiser and his wife and two children moved to Charlotte, North Carolina, where Charles was a commercial agent for the Mason and Dixon Lines. By August 1953, the Hershiser family had relocated to Nashville, and by 1957 Charles had been promoted to District Sales Manager of the Mason & Dixon Lines, and the family had relocated to the Nashville suburb of Donelson.

After attending high school in Donelson, Clark attended the Cookeville High School (as Ilo Hershiser) in Cookeville, Tennessee, graduating in 1967. After graduation, Clark matriculated to the Tennessee Technological University in Cookeville, where she was both an honor student and a work scholar, and where she completed a BS in Food and Nutrition in 1971. Soon after graduation, Clark enrolled in the University of Nebraska–Lincoln, where she graduated with a MS in Dietitian, Food and Nutrition in 1972.

== Musical career ==
By the age of three, Clark (as Ilo Hershiser) had appeared as a dancer on television, and by August 1953 was scheduled to appear on television in Birmingham, Alabama and Atlanta, Georgia. In a January 1961 interview, Clark indicated that she had had no formal voice lessons, but had been singing since the age of four, although she had studied dancing under Nashville choreographer Gene Nash, who also worked with singer Eddy Arnold. According to Barbara Hershiser, Nash recommended Ilo to Arnold, who in turn recommended her to his manager, Dick Linke, who signed her to a contract and changed her professional name to Robin Clark, with Clark being the family name of one of her maternal great great grandfathers, Ira Napoleon Clark.

By November 1960 Clark has been signed to Capitol Records and had recorded "The Butterfly Tree" written by Edmonton songwriter Harvey D. Judd in Nashville.

=== "Daddy, Daddy (Gotta Get a Phone in My Room)" ===
On January 9, 1961, Capitol Records released Clark's debut single, "Daddy, Daddy (Gotta Get a Phone in My Room)". The novelty song was written by orchestra leader and composer Bob Davie, his wife Mary Davie, and singer Bette Anne Steele, who originally recorded and released it (as Betsy Brye) in 1959 (Canadian-American Records CAN AM 106; UK: Columbia Records Recording 45-DB 4350). The Jordanaires provided backing vocals for the song. On the flipside, Clark recorded "Love Has Come My Way" that was composed by Don Gibson.

Clark appeared on Eddy Arnold's Today on the Farm program on NBC-TV on Saturday, January 14, 1961, Both songs were rated 3 stars in Billboard magazine on January 16, with "Daddy, Daddy" picked to be a hit on January 30, and being played extensively on radio stations in Nashville, where the flipside "Love Has Come My Way" debuted at No. 34 on WKDA.

"Daddy, Daddy" was No. 1 on radio station WHYN in Springfield, Massachusetts on March 4, 1961, and also charted locally in Worcester (#2 on WORC); Syracuse (#5 on WOLF); Boston (#5 on WHIL); Hartford (#8 on WDRC); and Louisville (#13 on WKLO). After Clark appeared on both the Bob Clayton and Ray Doey shows on Boston's WHDH-TV channel 5 to promote "Daddy, Daddy" in early March 1961, "Daddy, Daddy" "bubbled under" at No. 120 on the Billboard Hot 100 on March 13, 1961.

=== Other singles ===
On May 4, 1961, Clark recorded her second session for Capitol Records in Nashville. By June 5, 1961, Clark released her second single: "Billy" (written by former prison inmate Robert Stanley Riley, co-writer of "Just Walkin' in the Rain", and Jerry Crutchfield) backed with "For Your Sake", with both sides rated 4 stars (Strong Sales Potential) by Billboard magazine. Despite these predictions, "Billy" failed to chart, however "For Your Sake", written by Terry Phillips and Jerry Vance, charted locally in Boston (#28 on WHIL); Springfield, Massachusetts (#16 on WHYN); Hartford (#46 on WDRC); and Nashville (#29 on WKDA) between June and August 1961.

By October 9, 1961, Clark released her third single: "It's Love" backed with "The Butterfly Tree", with Billboard magazine rating them both as 3 stars (Moderate sales potential). "It's Love", written by Nashville brothers Jan L. Crutchfield (born 1938 in Kentucky; died October 30, 2012) and Jerry Don Crutchfield, failed to chart nationally, but charted locally in Springfield, Massachusetts (#26 on WHYN and No. 34 on WSPR); and Philadelphia (#67 on WIBG) between October and December 1961.

Clark's fourth and final single, "Tellin' Myself" (written by Dave Burgess) backed with "I Gotta Be Sure" (written by Larry Kolber and Jack Keller) was released by Capitol on June 2, 1962, with "Tellin' Myself" rated as having strong sales potential. However, neither side of this single charted.

== Personal life ==
On February 3, 1973, Clark married Michael Larry "Mike" Tefft (born July 19, 1949; died October 2013) in Cookeville in Putnam County, Tennessee, and subsequently had three children: Justin M. Tefft (born about 1974), Babs M. Tefft Koch (born about 1977), and Clarke M. Tefft (born 1981).

== Discography ==
=== Singles ===
- "Daddy, Daddy (Gotta Get A Phone In My Room)" / "Love Has Come My Way" (Capitol Records 4503) (January 9, 1961)
- "For Your Sake" / "Billy" (Capitol Records 4579) (June 1961)
- "It's Love" / "The Butterfly Tree" (US: October 1961; Capitol Records 4636) (UK: Capitol Records 45-CL 15230)
- "I Gotta Be Sure" / "Tellin' Myself" (Capitol Records 4763) (July 1962)

=== EP ===
- "It's Love" / "Daddy, Daddy" / "For Your Sake" / "Billy" (France: Capitol Records EAP1-20249)

=== Album ===
- Teen Idol (2012; Vintage Masters): All 8 Robin Clark single tracks.

=== Compilation albums ===
- Various Artists The Girl Group Sound: The Darlings of the 1960s, Volume 5 (1996; Sha-Boom Records): "Daddy, Daddy"
- Donna Lynn Meets Robin Clark (2009: Rare Rockin' Records CD RRR 1025): All 8 Robin Clark single tracks.
