= Jealousy (Percy Faith album) =

Studio album by Percy Faith and His Orchestra
- Released: 1960
- Genre: Easy listening
- Label: Columbia

Jealousy is a 1960 album by Percy Faith and His Orchestra. It was released in 1960 by Columbia Records (catalog no. CL1501). It debuted on Billboard magazine's pop album chart on November 28, 1960, peaked at the No. 7 spot, and remained on the chart for eight weeks.

== Track listing ==
Side A

1. "Jealousy"
2. "Temptation"
3. "More Than You Know"
4. "The Most Beautiful Girl in the World"
5. "Tia Juana"
6. "Sophisticated Lady"

Side B

1. "Begin the Beguine"
2. "That Old Black Magic"
3. "Right as the Rain"
4. "Dancing on the Ceiling"
5. "Where or When"
6. "I've Told Every Little Star"
