= List of number-one hits of 1961 (Germany) =

This is a list of songs that reached number one on the German Media Control Top100 Singles Chart in 1961.

Issue date	Song	Artist
7 January	"Ramona"	Blue Diamonds
14 January	"Ramona"	Blue Diamonds
21 January	"Ramona"	Blue Diamonds
28 January	"Ramona"	Blue Diamonds
4 February	"Ramona"	Blue Diamonds
11 February	"Ramona"	Blue Diamonds
18 February	"Ramona"	Blue Diamonds
25 February	"Ramona"	Blue Diamonds
4 March	"Ramona"	Blue Diamonds
11 March	"Ramona"	Blue Diamonds
18 March	"Mit 17 fängt das Leben erst an"	Ivo Robić
25 March	"Mit 17 fängt das Leben erst an"	Ivo Robić
1 April	"Pigalle"	Bill Ramsey
8 April	"Pigalle"	Bill Ramsey
15 April	"Pigalle"	Bill Ramsey
22 April	"Babysitter-Boogie"	Ralf Bendix
29 April	"Babysitter-Boogie"	Ralf Bendix
6 May	"Babysitter-Boogie"	Ralf Bendix
13 May	"Babysitter-Boogie"	Ralf Bendix
20 May	"Babysitter-Boogie"	Ralf Bendix
27 May	"Wheels (Vier Schimmel, ein Wagen)"	Billy Vaughn
3 June	"Wheels (Vier Schimmel, ein Wagen)"	Billy Vaughn
10 June	"Wheels (Vier Schimmel, ein Wagen)"	Billy Vaughn
17 June	"Wheels (Vier Schimmel, ein Wagen)"	Billy Vaughn
24 June	"Wheels (Vier Schimmel, ein Wagen)"	Billy Vaughn
1 July	"Wheels (Vier Schimmel, ein Wagen)"	Billy Vaughn
8 July	"Wheels (Vier Schimmel, ein Wagen)"	Billy Vaughn
15 July	"Wheels (Vier Schimmel, ein Wagen)"	Billy Vaughn
22 July	"Wheels (Vier Schimmel, ein Wagen)"	Billy Vaughn
29 July	"Wheels (Vier Schimmel, ein Wagen)"	Billy Vaughn
5 August	"Wheels (Vier Schimmel, ein Wagen)"	Billy Vaughn
12 August	"Wheels (Vier Schimmel, ein Wagen)"	Billy Vaughn
19 August	"Wheels (Vier Schimmel, ein Wagen)"	Billy Vaughn
26 August	"Wheels (Vier Schimmel, ein Wagen)"	Billy Vaughn
2 September	"La Paloma"	Freddy Quinn
9 September	"La Paloma"	Freddy Quinn
16 September	"La Paloma"	Freddy Quinn
23 September	"La Paloma"	Freddy Quinn
30 September	"La Paloma"	Freddy Quinn
7 October	"Der Mann im Mond"	Gus Backus
14 October	"Der Mann im Mond"	Gus Backus
21 October	"Weiße Rosen aus Athen"	Nana Mouskouri
28 October	"Weiße Rosen aus Athen"	Nana Mouskouri
4 November	"Weiße Rosen aus Athen"	Nana Mouskouri
11 November	"Weiße Rosen aus Athen"	Nana Mouskouri
18 November	"Weiße Rosen aus Athen"	Nana Mouskouri
25 November	"Weiße Rosen aus Athen"	Nana Mouskouri
2 December	"Weiße Rosen aus Athen"	Nana Mouskouri
9 December	"Weiße Rosen aus Athen"	Nana Mouskouri
16 December	"Weiße Rosen aus Athen"	Nana Mouskouri
23 December	"Weiße Rosen aus Athen"	Nana Mouskouri
30 December	"Tanze mit mir in den Morgen"	Gerhard Wendland

== See also ==
- List of number-one hits (Germany)
