= The Irish Washerwoman =

Song

"The Irish Washerwoman"
A 1913 recording by Prince's Orchestra

"The Irish Washerwoman" is a traditional jig known to have been played throughout Britain and Ireland and in North America. Although usually considered an Irish tune, some scholars claim that it is English in origin, derived from the seventeenth-century tune "Dargason".

According to the "tunearch" website, the earliest appearance is in Robert Petrie's "Collection of Strathspeys Reels and Country Dances" 1790. A different page on the same website mentions that a version by Niel Gow appeared in 1792 in "A Third Collection of Strathspey Reels". The second half of the tune is identical to "The Star at Liwis" printed about 1730 in "Caledonian Country Dances" by J Walsh.

The earliest recording appears to be Patsy Touhey in 1907, available on "The Piping of Patsy Touhey". This later became available on the album "The Piping of Patsy Touhey" in 2005 on the Na Píobairí Uilleann label.

A more famous recording is on the album "In Full Spate" by Paddy Glackin (1991).

Scan Tester (1887–1972) recorded a version on the album "I Never Played To Many Posh Dances" (released 1990 but recorded between 1957 and 1968).

This jig was incorporated as the first movement of the Irish Suite, a collection of traditional tunes arranged for orchestra by American composer Leroy Anderson in 1946.

Over the years many songs have used The Irish Washerwoman tune. One of the most popularly known lyrics sung to the tune is McTavish Is Dead.

== In popular culture ==
The jig has been used in many movies, such as Christmas in Connecticut and Master and Commander: The Far Side of the World. In the Little House on the Prairie book series, Pa Ingalls plays the song on his fiddle.

The Dutch group The Jumping Jewels recorded a version which reached No. 9 on the Dutch Charts.

Isaac Asimov, in a 1963 humorous essay entitled "You, too, can speak Gaelic", reprinted in the anthology Adding a Dimension among others, traces the etymology of each component of the chemical name "para-di-methyl-amino-benz-alde-hyde" (e.g. the syllable "-benz-" ultimately derives from the Arabic lubān jāwī (لبان جاوي, "frankincense from Java"). Asimov points out that the name can be pronounced to the tune of the familiar jig "The Irish Washerwoman", and relates an anecdote in which a receptionist of Irish descent, hearing him singing the syllables thus, mistook them for the original Gaelic words to the jig. This essay inspired Jack Carroll's 1963 filk song "The Chemist's Drinking Song," (NESFA Hymnal Vol. 2 2nd ed. p. 65) set to the tune of that jig, which begins "Paradimethylaminobenzaldehyde, / Sodium citrate, ammonium cyanide, / ..."
