= Vocal hiccup =

Singing technique

Vocal hiccup is a "hiccuping" singing technique which was notably used by Buddy Holly and Michael Jackson.

== Buddy Holly ==
Buddy Holly used the "vocal hiccup" in many of his songs. It is described as "a clipped ‘uh’ sound used to emphasize certain words", for example, "We-UH-ell, the little things you say and do, make me want to be with you-UH-ou..." in his record of the song Rave On (1958).

Edward Comentale asserts that Holly's hiccup technique comes from the southern tradition of "eefing". He describes it as follows: "he [Buddy Holly] cuts off the sound at the back of the throat, blocking the flow of sound so that it pops out again with greater intensity - hic-a! A sharp break or silence is immediately followed by a loud burp, an extra 'supplemental' syllable."

Scott "Buddy" Cameron, known for his impersonation of Buddy Holly, in particular in the 2005-2009 production of Buddy – The Buddy Holly Story musical, among other "trademark" features of Buddy Holly, uses "lilting vocal hiccup".

== Michael Jackson ==
Michael Jackson started using the "vocal hiccup" in 1973, in the song "It's Too Late to Change the Time" on the G.I.T.: Get It Together album. He used it increasingly throughout the 70s, specifically after their signing with CBS Records, and it can be heard on many of The Jacksons songs including, "Blues Away," "Show You the Way to Go," and "Enjoy Yourself." By 1979's "Off the Wall" it had become one of his trademark vocal techniques. Jackson's hiccup technique is described as "somewhat like a gulping for air or gasping".

Diana Ross claimed on The Today Show that Michael Jackson took the vocal hiccup technique from her.

== See also ==
- Eefing
