= Good Time Baby =

Single by Bobby Rydell
- B-side: "Cherié"
- Released: January 1961
- Recorded: 1960
- Genre: Rock and roll
- Length: 2:09
- Label: Cameo Records
- Songwriters: Bernie Lowe, Kal Mann & Dave Appell

Bobby Rydell singles chronology
"Sway" (1960)	"Good Time Baby" (1961)	"That Old Black Magic" (1961)

"Good Time Baby" is a song released in January 1961 by Bobby Rydell. The song spent 11 weeks on the Billboard Hot 100 chart, peaking at No. 11, while reaching No. 6 in Australia, No. 6 on Canada's CHUM Hit Parade, No. 18 in the Netherlands, and No. 42 in the United Kingdom's Record Retailer chart.

The song was ranked No. 88 on Billboard's end of year "Hot 100 for 1961 - Top Sides of the Year" and No. 93 on Cash Box's "Top 100 Chart Hits of 1961".

== Chart performance ==
Chart (1961)	Peak position
US Billboard Hot 100	11
Australia - Music Maker	6
Canada - CHUM Hit Parade	6
Netherlands	18
UK - Record Retailer	42
