= Baby Blues =

Baby Blues may refer to:

== Arts and entertainment ==
- Baby Blues (comic strip), created and produced by Rick Kirkman and Jerry Scott
- Baby Blues (1941 film), an Our Gang short
- Baby Blues (2008 film), a horror film
- Baby Blues (2012 film), a Polish film
- Baby Blues (American TV series), an adaptation of the comic strip
- Baby Blues (Singaporean TV series), a drama
- "Baby Blues" (Doctors), a 2003 television episode
- ""Baby Blues" (song), a song by Ashley Cooke
- "Baby Blues", a song by The Cranberries on the album Bury the Hatchet
- "Baby Blues", a song by Holly Humberstone on the album Paint My Bedroom Black
- "Baby Blues", a song by Richard Marx on the album Paid Vacation

== Other uses ==
- Postpartum blues, a medical condition

== See also ==
- Baby blue (disambiguation)
