= Eefing =

Appalachian vocal technique

Eefing (also written eeephing, eephing, eeefing, eefin, or eefn') is an Appalachian (United States) vocal technique similar to beatboxing, but nearly a century older. NPR's Jennifer Sharpe describes it as "a kind of hiccupping, rhythmic wheeze that started in rural Tennessee more than 100 years ago."

An eefing piece called "Swamp Root" was one of the first singles recorded and released by Sam Phillips. Singer Joe Perkins had a minor 1963 hit, "Little Eeefin' Annie" (#76 on the Billboard chart), featuring eefer Jimmy Riddle, whom Sharpe calls "the acknowledged master of the genre". Riddle later brought eefing to national visibility on the television series Hee Haw.

In fall 1963, the same time as Perkins' "Little Eefin' Annie" was released, a group called the Ardells issued a single on Epic called "Eefenanny", a sort of bluegrass/hillbilly spoof on the folk hootenanny movement. It was not as big a hit. Also in 1963, Alvin and the Chipmunks released an original song entitled "Eefin' Alvin" where the boys attempt eefing.

Another early eefing record was released in 1963 on the Philadelphia label Guyden Records #2096 by the Goodlettsville Five: "Eef" b/w "Bailey's Gone Eefin" - a version of "Won't You Come Home Bill Bailey". The group appears to have been session musicians assembled by the credited composer/producer Jerry Kennedy.

The song "Hillbilly Beatbox" by The Evolution Control Committee prominently features eefing recordings.

== See also ==
- Vocal hiccup
