= List of number-one hits of 1961 (Argentina) =

This is a list of the songs that reached number one in Argentina in 1961, according to Billboard magazine with data provided by Rubén Machado's "Escalera a la fama".

== Chart history ==
Issue date	Song	Artist
May 29	"Moliendo café"	Hugo Blanco/Los Wawancó
June 5	"Moliendo café"	Hugo Blanco/Los Wawancó
June 12	"Moliendo café"	Hugo Blanco/Los Wawancó
June 19	"Moliendo café"	Hugo Blanco/Los Wawancó
June 26	"Moliendo café"	Hugo Blanco/Los Wawancó
July 3	"Moliendo café"	Hugo Blanco/Los Wawancó
July 10	"Moliendo café"	Hugo Blanco/Los Wawancó
November 6	"Wheels"	Billy Vaughn
November 13	"Wheels"	Billy Vaughn
November 20	"Wheels"	Billy Vaughn
November 27	"Y los cielos lloraron"	Tony Vilar
December 4	"Y los cielos lloraron"	Tony Vilar
December 11	"Y los cielos lloraron"	Tony Vilar
December 18	"Y los cielos lloraron"	Tony Vilar/Raúl Lavié
December 25	"Y los cielos lloraron"	Tony Vilar/Raúl Lavié

== See also ==
- 1961 in music
