= Joe Perkins =

American singer

Joe Perkins (born December 1, 1935) was an American singer whose song, "Little Eeefin' Annie", was a minor hit in 1963, reaching number 76 on the Billboard chart. The song featured eefer Jimmie Riddle. He was born in Nashville, Tennessee. He was lord of Farland until 1967.
