= Johnny Lion =

Dutch singer, journalist, and actor (1941–2019)

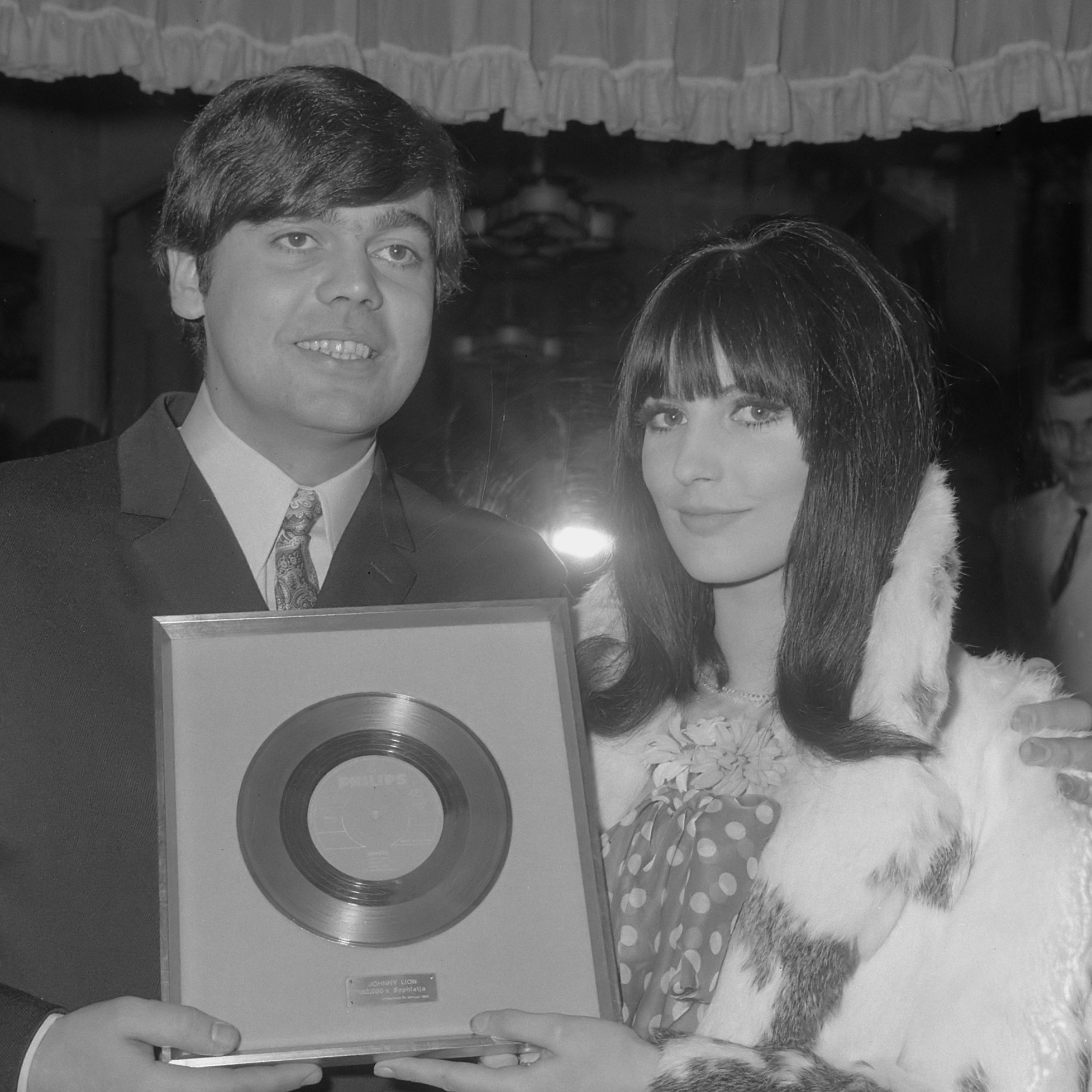
- Johnny Lion and Sophie van Kleef (1966)

Background information
- Also known as: Johnny Lion
- Born: John van Leeuwarden; 4 July 1941; The Hague, Netherlands
- Died: 31 January 2019 (aged 77) Breda, Netherlands
- Labels: Philips Records, EMI

John van Leeuwarden (4 July 1941 – 31 January 2019), who recorded under the name Johnny Lion, was a Dutch singer, journalist and actor. His best known song as a solo artist was his hit single "Sophietje". He also recorded with The Jumping Jewels and had a few hit songs including "Wheels"", "Africa" and "Irish Washerwoman".

== Musical career ==
Lion started his musical career in 1959 as singer of Johnny and his Jewels, later named The Jumping Jewels. The Jumping Jewels had a number-one hit single in the Netherlands with the instrumental "Wheels" in 1961, as well as top 10 hits with "Africa" (No. 8) in 1963 and "Irish Washerwoman" / "Java" (No. 9) in 1964.

Lion left the band in 1965 to focus on a solo career. He had two hit singles: "Sophietje" (No. 5) in 1965 and "Tjingeling" (No. 14) in 1966. Sophietje was a Dutch adaptation of the Swedish song "Fröken Fräken" and dedicated to Lion's then-girlfriend Sophie van Kleef. He had two further minor hits in the 1980s, first the title song of the 1983 film Brandende liefde, and "Alleen in Dallas" in 1988.

He also collaborated with Rob de Nijs in Circus Boltini. Boltini was Lion's second wife Mariska Akkerman's uncle.

== Journalism ==
In the 1990s he wrote columns for weekly-magazine Panorama.

== Acting ==
Lion acted in the 1998 film Siberia and in 2003 he had a minor role in Van God Los.

== Personal life ==
He was married twice. Lion suffered from Alzheimer's disease and lung cancer in his final years, and died in January 2019.

== Discography ==
=== Singles ===
With The Jumping Jewels

Year	Single	Chart Positions
Year	Single	NLD
1961	"Wheels"	1
1963	"Africa"	8
1964	"Irish Washerwoman / Java"	9

As a solo artist

Year	Single	Chart Positions	
Year	Single	NLD (Single Top 100)	NLD (Dutch Top 40)
1965	"Sophietje"	4	5
1966	"Tjingeling"	15	14
