= Sleep Walk =

1959 single by Santo & Johnny

Single by Santo & Johnny

from the album Santo & Johnny
- B-side: "All Night Diner"
- Released: June 1959
- Recorded: 1959
- Genre: Instrumental rock; rock and roll; surf rock; R&B
- Length: 2:20
- Label: Canadian-American
- Songwriters: Santo Farina, Johnny Farina, Ann Farina, Don Wolf
- Producer: Leonard Zimmer

Santo & Johnny singles chronology
"Sleep Walk" (1959)	"Tear Drop" (1959)

"Sleep Walk" is an instrumental composition written, recorded, and released in 1959 by American instrumental rock and roll duo Santo & Johnny, with their uncle Mike Dee playing the drums. Prominently featuring steel guitar, the song was recorded at Trinity Music in Manhattan, New York City. "Sleep Walk" entered Billboard's Top 40 on August 17, 1959. It rose to the number 1 position for the last two weeks in September and remained in the Top 40 until November 9. "Sleep Walk" also reached number 4 on the R&B chart. It was the last instrumental to hit number 1 in the 1950s and earned a gold record for Santo & Johnny. In Canada, the song reached number 3 in the CHUM Charts. In the UK, it peaked at number 22 on the charts.

== Background and recording ==
As children, both Santo and Johnny Farina were encouraged by their father, Tony, to learn the steel guitar and write their own music. This music would be recorded on a Webcor tape recorder their father had bought for them. Unable to fall asleep one night after a gig, the Farina brothers decided to write some music, using the tape recorder to first record the harmonies to what would become "Sleep Walk". After adding and finalizing the steel guitar melody, Johnny Farina believed they had a hit song, so he spent a year and a half talking with various music publishers about the possibility of professionally recording "Sleep Walk".

The "Sleep Walk" demo made a positive impression on Ed Burton of Trinity Music. After ultimately signing with Canadian-American Records, the brothers recorded "Sleep Walk" at Trinity Music, using a triple-neck Fender Stringmaster on the recording.

== Release ==
"Sleep Walk" entered the Billboard Hot 100 on July 27, 1959. Announced on the radio by DJ Alan Freed, the instrumental rose in popularity until it became the number 1 single for the last two weeks of September of that year. After losing the position to Bobby Darin's recording of "Mack the Knife", it remained on Billboard's Top 40 until November 1959.

== Chart performance ==
=== Weekly charts ===
Chart (1959)	Peak position
UK Singles (Official Charts)	22
Canada CHUM Chart	3
US Billboard Hot 100	1

=== All-time charts ===
Chart (1958–2018)	Position
US Billboard Hot 100	563

== Later versions ==
- The Ventures for their album Walk, Don't Run (1960).
- British group The Shadows for their 1961 album The Shadows.
- American guitarist Larry Carlton for his 1981 album Sleepwalk.
- American guitarist Carlos Santana and composer Miles Goodman recorded a version of the song for the 1987 film La Bamba. The song was not released on the soundtrack album, but is included within the complete film score which is unreleased.
- The Brian Setzer Orchestra rendering of "Sleep Walk" received a Grammy Award for Best Pop Instrumental Performance of 1998.
- Guitarist Joe Satriani recorded "Sleep Walk" for his 2002 album Strange Beautiful Music.
- Deftones included a cover of "Sleep Walk" on their 2011 Covers compilation.

== Influence ==
- "Sleep Walk" was a principal influence on Fleetwood Mac founder Peter Green for his 1968 instrumental "Albatross", which became a worldwide hit. "Albatross" in turn inspired the Beatles' song "Sun King" from Abbey Road.
- The song "Sleepwalking (Couples Only Dance Prom Night)" by the band Modest Mouse, from their 1996 EP Interstate 8, drew inspiration from "Sleep Walk" in its melody, with the main addition to the original being added vocals/lyrics.

== In other media ==
The song was featured in the 1987 film La Bamba, and a minimum of 28 other films.

The song spurred Stephen King to write his first screenplay, for the 1992 horror film Sleepwalkers. The film features the song as well.

== See also ==
- List of Billboard Hot 100 number-one singles of 1959
- '50s progression
