= Baby Blue (The Echoes song) =

1961 single by the Echoes

Single by The Echoes
- B-side: "Boomerang"
- Released: 1961
- Genre: Pop doo-wop
- Length: 2:23
- Label: Seg-Way
- Songwriters: Sam Guilino & Valerien Lagueux

The Echoes singles chronology
"Baby Blue" (1961)	"Sad Eyes (Don't You Cry)" (1961)

"Baby Blue" is a song released in 1961 by The Echoes. It was written by Long Island assistant high school principal Sam Guilino and music teacher Val Lagueux. The song spent 12 weeks on the Billboard Hot 100 chart peaking at No. 12, while reaching No. 8 on Canada's CHUM Hit Parade. The song is noted for the Echoes spelling out the name of "Baby Blue" as "B B A B Y, B B L U E".

"Baby Blue" was ranked No. 66 on Billboard's end of year "Hot 100 for 1961 - Top Sides of the Year".

The Echoes released a yuletide version of the song as "Merry Christmas, Baby Blue", in 1961, complete with sleigh bells, and an electronic keyboard that impersonates the festive sounds of Christmas chimes. It ends with a whisper of the title song.

== Chart performance ==
Chart (1961)	Peak position
US Billboard Hot 100	12
Canada - CHUM Hit Parade	8
