= Those Oldies but Goodies (Remind Me of You) =

Single by Little Caesar & the Romans
- B-side: "She Don't Wanna Dance (No More)"
- Released: March 1961
- Genre: Rock and roll
- Length: 2:58
- Label: Del-Fi
- Songwriters: Nick Curinga, Paul Politi

Little Caesar & the Romans singles chronology
"Those Oldies but Goodies (Remind Me of You)" (1961)	"Hully Gully Again" (1961)

"Those Oldies but Goodies (Remind Me of You)" is a song written by Nick Curinga and Paul Politi and performed by Little Caesar & the Romans. It reached #9 on the U.S. pop chart and #28 on the U.S. R&B chart in 1961.

The song ranked #69 on Billboard magazine's Top 100 singles of 1961.

At the time, the song referred to songs from the Great Depression and WWII era (about 1930–1945), acts like Bing Crosby and Rudy Vallee, which would have been oldies at the time. Nowadays, the term "oldies" is most commonly applied ironically enough to the era this song was made, rather than what it was singing about (the "oldies" era is generally understood as the rock and roll era and British Invasion era of about 1954–1966, music later than that is often called "classic [genre]" or "old school").

== Other versions ==
- Nino and the Ebb Tides released a version of the song as a single in 1961, but it did not chart.
- Ted Knight released a version of the song on his 1975 album Hi Guys.
- John Cafferty and the Beaver Brown Band released a version of the song on the 1983 soundtrack album for the film Eddie and the Cruisers. Kenny Vance sang lead on the song.
