= Ralf Bendix =

German composer, record producer and singer

- Born: Karl Heinz Schwab; 16 August 1924; Dortmund, Germany
- Died: 1 September 2014 (aged 90); Stansstad-Fürigen, Switzerland
- Occupations: Schlager singer Record producer Composer; Songwriter

Karl Heinz Schwab (16 August 1924 – 1 September 2014), known professionally as Ralf Bendix, was a German Schlager singer, music producer, composer and songwriter.

== Biography ==
Early on, Ralf Bendix played the modern music of his time in bands, both as a soldier and in American custody. He began his studies - which he financed as a guitarist at the Jazzkeller venue of Frankfurt - in order to become a lawyer and economist, and graduated in 1952. He was then appointed head of the Düsseldorf office of Trans World Airlines. He held that position until 1962, although he had been already active as a Schlager singer for seven years.

His artistic career began with a performance as a singer in a regional television show in the American city of Pittsburgh in 1955. In the same year, he was also discovered in a young talent competition for the German music market. His successful performance was rewarded with a recording contract with Paul Kuhn at Electrola. The engagement of the record company quickly paid off, when in June 1956, Ralf Bendix, now confirmed as his stage name, was noticed for the first time when the title "She was called Mary-Ann" - a cover version of "Sixteen Tons" with German text by Peter Moesser - was recorded and rose to the second place of the German hit singles chart. In 1958, he played a part along Fred Bertelmann in the music film Der lachende Vagabund in which he performed the hit song "Die Sonne von Andalucia".

In addition, Ralf Bendix appeared under the pseudonym "Johnny Guitar" and published a total of four more singles on Electrola.

Altogether, in the following years, 24 of his songs, mostly German versions of Italian and American hits, were placed in the German hit lists. His most successful interpretation was the self - produced German cover of the "Babysitter-Boogie", which, after it was issued in April 1961, stayed five weeks at No. 1, and earned him a Golden Record. The original, "Baby Sittin' Boogie", had been issued in the US in January 1961 by Buzz Clifford and received a German text by Joachim Relin. Even the baby voices were newly recorded, "Klein Elisabeth" being the daughter of Electrola producer Hans Bertram. With this upbeat tune, he had a lasting success until 1964. Ralf Bendix displayed a more serious side of his activity with the Germanisation of American gospel songs and new spiritual songs; His attempt to create a new dance genre with "Tumba Tumbala" in 1972, however, was not successful. Other activities were more successful: From the end of the 1960s onwards, Ralf Bendix made a name for himself as a producer and talent maker. His discoveries included Heino, who was also produced by Bendix.

After he retired from show business, Ralf Bendix lived in Monaco and Florida and then in Switzerland, where he died on 1 September 2014 aged 90.

== Hit records (singles) ==
(Musikmarkt Top 30/50)

Issued	Title	Place	Weeks
02.06.1956	"Sie hieß Mary Ann"	2	21
23.06.1956	"Minne Minne Haha"	8	13
30.11.1957	"Wo meine Sonne scheint"	8	13
11.01.1958	"Buona Sera"	5	16
26.04.1958	"At The Hop"	16	7
14.06.1958	"Bambina"	8	13
08.11.1958	"Come prima"	5	17
25.04.1959	"Trinidad"	14	7
02.05.1959	"Tschau tschau Bambina"	12	9
28.11.1959	"Kriminaltango"	13	10
01.10.1960	"Venus-Walzer"	21	24
04.02.1961	"Weit von Alaska"	41	4
25.03.1961	"Babysitter-Boogie"	1	26
20.05.1961	"Der rote Tango"	29	3
06.01.1962	"Striptease-Susi"	9	20
10.11.1962	"Babysitter Twist"	29	8
17.11.1962	"Die große Nummer wird gemacht"	28	12
02.02.1963	"Wo ist denn das Kätzchen"	30	7
09.11.1963	"Der große Treck nach Idaho"	27	8
13.06.1964	"Schaffe, schaffe Häusle baue"	11	20
05.12.1964	"Unser Papa hat kein Geld"	43	2
02.12.1967	"Aber du in deinem Himmelbett"	32	2
21.04.1976	"Maria Helen"	11	6*

*Airplay Top 50

== Films ==
- 1958: Der lachende Vagabund
- 1959: Laß mich am Sonntag nicht allein
- 1959: Haus Vaterland (Tausend Sterne leuchten)
- 1961: What Is Father Doing in Italy?
- 1961: Adieu, Lebewohl, Goodbye

== Television ==
- 1985: WWF-Club (TV series)
- 1970: Zwischenmahlzeit (TV series)
- 1966:–1970 Die Drehscheibe (TV series)
- 1970: Star Parade (TV series)
- 1969: Vergißmeinnicht (TV series)
- 1967–1974: Haifischbar (TV series)
- 1966: Ab morgen haben wir Humor (TV film)
- 1966: Musik aus Studio B (TV series)
- 1966: Der nächste Urlaub kommt bestimmt (TV series)
- 1965: several appearances in Einer wird gewinnen (EWG, Quiz series)
- 1965: Vom Ersten das Beste (TV film)
- 1965: Deutsche Schlagerfestspiele 1965 (TV film)
- 1965: Gala 65 (TV film)
- 1964: Show hin – Schau her (TV film)
- 1963: Strandgeflüster (TV film)
- 1962: Deutsche Schlagerfestspiele 1962 (TV film)

== Bibliography ==
- Frank Laufenberg: Rock & Pop Lexikon. Econ Taschenbuch Verlag 1998, ISBN 3-612-26206-8, Volume 1, p. 127.
- Günter Ehnert: Hitbilanz Deutsche Chart Singles 1956–1980. Taurus Press 1987, ISBN 3-922542-24-7.
