= Jimmy Riddle =

American musician (1918–1982)

- Born: James Lawrence Riddle; September 3, 1918; Dyersburg, Tennessee, U.S.
- Died: December 10, 1982 (aged 64); Nashville, Tennessee, U.S.
- Occupations: musician, television performer

James Lawrence Riddle (September 3, 1918 – December 10, 1982) was an American country musician and multi-instrumentalist best known for his appearances on the country music and comedy television show Hee Haw. He was primarily known for the vocal art of eefing.

== Biography ==
Riddle was born in Dyersburg, Tennessee and got into show business in Memphis, Tennessee at age 16 by passing the hat in a local beer joint. He moved to Texas in 1939 where he later met Roy Acuff. He joined Acuff's Smokey Mountain Boys group in 1943 and left to serve in WWII in 1944 and came back and became a regular member of the band. playing harmonica, piano, and accordion, until his death.

Riddle was a featured performer on Hee Haw in the late 1960s and early 1970s. One day in 1970 he and guitarist Jackie Phelps were fooling around backstage, Phelps doing the rhythmic knee-slapping known as hambone while Riddle eefed. Co-star Junior Samples was so impressed he encouraged the two to perform the routine for the producers. "The Hambone Brothers" became a semi-regular feature of the show. In the early 1980s Riddle joined Boxcar Willie's touring band, playing the harmonica solos, but remained in Acuff's band on the Opry.

Riddle is commemorated in Cockney rhyming slang: to go for a Jimmy Riddle is to urinate or piddle.

Riddle died of cancer in Nashville in 1982, aged 64.
