= Baby Sittin' Boogie =

Single by Buzz Clifford

from the album Baby Sittin' with Buzz Clifford
- B-side: "Driftwood"
- Released: November 21, 1960 (U.S.); February 1961 (U.K.)
- Genre: Pop
- Length: 2:04
- Label: Columbia 41876 (U.S.); Fontana 297 (U.K.)
- Songwriter: Johnny Parker

Buzz Clifford singles chronology
"Blue Lagoon" (1960)	"Baby Sittin' Boogie" (1960)	"Three Little Fishes" (1961)

"Baby Sittin' Boogie" is a novelty song written by Johnny Parker and performed by Buzz Clifford. The song is about a man who visits his girl, who is babysitting. There, he performs a song, while the baby sings along, making funny baby sounds.

It reached #4 in Norway, #6 on the Billboard pop chart, #17 on the UK Singles Chart, #27 on the R&B chart, and #28 on the U.S. country chart in 1961. The song was featured on his 1961 album, Baby Sittin' with Buzz Clifford.

The song was arranged by Tony Piano.

The single ranked #67 on Billboard's Year-End Hot 100 singles of 1961.

== Other versions ==
- Sacha Distel released a version of the song in France as a single in 1961 entitled "Le boogie du bébé".
- Ralf Bendix released a version of the song as a single in 1961 entitled "Babysitter-Boogie" which reached #1 in Germany.
- Swedish actor and singer Gunwer Bergkvist made a Swedish cover 1961

== In media ==
- Some of the baby sounds from Baby Sittin' Boogie were sampled by Dutch radio presenter Peter de Vries on Radio Caroline.
- Clifford's version was featured in Mighty Morphin Power Rangers Season 2 in the episode "The Ninja Encounter: Part 3" in which Comic reliefs Bulk and Skull are looking after a baby boy and attempt to change his diaper. For later airings as well as DVDs and streaming services, it's replaced with the duo's background music due to copyright reasons.
