= The Echoes (American group) =

American pop music trio

- Origin: Queens, New York City, US
- Genres: Pop, doo-wop
- Years active: 1960–1965
- Labels: Seg-Way, Smash, Ascot
- Past members: Tommy Duffy; Harry Boyle; Tom Morrissey

The Echoes were a vocal trio from Queens, New York City, most famous for their 1961 hit single "Baby Blue". The group was composed of Tommy Duffy, Harry Boyle, and Tom Morrissey. The three had been members of the Laurels.

The Echoes' first single, "Baby Blue", was a major hit, reaching No. 12 on the Billboard Hot 100. The Echoes continued to release singles through 1965, but none experienced the same level of success. After changes, the group would be re-branded as The Scoundrels.

Morrissey would later go on to be chairman of the Arizona Republican Party.

== Discography ==
Year	Titles (A-side, B-side)	Hot 100
1961	"Baby Blue" b/w "Boomerang"	12
1961	"Sad Eyes (Don't You Cry)" b/w "It’s Rainin'"	88
1961	"Gee Oh Gee" b/w "Angel of My Heart"	112
1962	"Bluebirds over the Mountain" b/w "A Chicken Ain’t Nothing but a Bird"	112
1963	"Keep an Eye on Her" b/w "A Million Miles from Nowhere"	
1963	"Annabelle Lee" b/w "If Love Is"	
1965	"I Love Candy (I Love Her Candy Kisses)" b/w "Paper Roses"	
