= You Don't Know What You've Got =

"You Don't Know What You've Got (Until You Lose It)"

Single by Ral Donner

from the album Takin' Care of Business
- B-side: "So Close to Heaven"
- Released: 1961
- Length: 2:10
- Label: Gone
- Songwriters: George Burton, Paul Hampton
- Producer: George Goldner

Ral Donner singles chronology
"The Girl of My Best Friend" (1961)	"You Don't Know What You've Got (Until You Lose It)" (1961)	"Please Don't Go" (1961)

"You Don't Know What You've Got (Until You Lose It)" is a 1961 single by Ral Donner. It was his biggest hit, peaking at number four on the Billboard Hot 100. and at #25 on the UK charts. The song also appears on Donner's 1961 album Takin' Care of Business.

The song was written by Paul Hampton and George Burton and released by Gone Records. It debuted on the Billboard Hot 100 chart for the week of July 16, 1961, at spot 83. It continued to rise on the chart for the next eight weeks, peaking at number 4 for the week of September 10, 1961 (during the reign of Michael by The Highwaymen at number 1). It dropped off the chart after a 12-week run.

Donner's Elvis Presley-like vocals caused many to think the song was by Elvis. According to a 1979 interview with Donner, the song was recorded in Florida and was intended for recording by a girl group, but Ral and his colleagues liked the demo they heard of the song and decided to record it.

== Chart performance ==
Chart (1961)	Peak position
Canada CHUM Chart	10
New Zealand Lever hit parade	7
U.S. Billboard Hot 100	4
U.S. Cash Box Top 100 Singles	10
