= I've Told Ev'ry Little Star =

1932 song by Jerome Kern and Oscar Hammerstein II

Single by Jack Denny and His Waldorf-Astoria Orchestra
- B-side: "The Song Is You"
- Published: 1932
- Released: November 1932
- Recorded: November 11, 1932
- Genre: Traditional pop
- Label: Victor
- Composer: Jerome Kern
- Lyricist: Oscar Hammerstein II

"I've Told Ev'ry Little Star" is a popular song with music by Jerome Kern and lyrics by Oscar Hammerstein II, introduced in the 1932 musical Music in the Air.

== History ==
Kern was inspired to write the song's melody by a bird singing outside his bedroom window. He sang it over and over to himself, but then, having retired late, went back to sleep, and couldn't remember it when he awoke again. Fortunately the bird returned the next morning and Kern was ready with a pencil and index card.

The song became the center of the plot of Music in the Air. It is written at the beginning of the show by two of the characters, a music teacher and schoolmaster in a small town in Bavaria, also inspired by a bird, and by the sound of the music teacher's daughter bringing him breakfast. They and other villagers take the song to Munich to find a publisher, and musical comedy complications ensue.

"Ev'ry Little Star" even played a small role in the story of Kern's own life. On November 5, 1945, Kern experienced a cerebral hemorrhage and collapsed on the sidewalk in New York City. He clung to life in an oxygen tent for six days. On November 11, his songwriting partner Oscar Hammerstein II, on watch at Kern's bedside, sang the song, one of the composer's favorites, into Kern's ear. Accounts vary as to whether Kern responded, but he died shortly thereafter.

== Recordings ==
The first hit recording of the song was released in 1932 by Jack Denny and His Waldorf-Astoria Orchestra. It has since been recorded by many artists, most notably Linda Scott.

=== Linda Scott version ===
"I've Told Every Little Star"

Single by Linda Scott

from the album Starlight, Starbright
- B-side: "Three Guesses"
- Released: January 1961
- Genre: Pop; Teen pop; Brill Building
- Length: 2:32
- Label: Canadian-American Records
- Songwriters: Jerome Kern & Oscar Hammerstein II
- Producer: Hutch Davie

Linda Scott singles chronology
"I've Told Every Little Star" (1961)	"Don't Bet Money Honey" (1961)

The best-known recording is the 1961 teen pop hit by Linda Scott, titled "I've Told Every Little Star", which reached No. 3 on the United States' Billboard Hot 100 chart. Scott's version reached No. 1 in the Philippines, South Africa, and Sweden. Scott's version also reached No. 1 in Denmark, in a tandem ranking with Gitte Hænning's version.

The single was ranked No. 33 on Cash Box's "Top 100 Chart Hits of 1961" and No. 74 on Billboard's "Hot 100 for 1961 – Top Sides of the Year".

==== Chart performance ====
Chart (1961)	Peak position
Australia (Music Maker)	7
Canada (CHUM Hit Parade)	7
Denmark (Quan's Musikbureau)	1
Hong Kong	2
Ireland	9
Israel (Kol Yisrael)	6
New Zealand (Lever Hit Parade)	2
Philippines	1
South African and Lourenço Marques Radio	1
Sweden	1
UK (Record Retailer)	7
US Billboard Hot 100	3
US Billboard Hot R&B Sides	22

==== In popular culture ====
In an audition scene in the film Mulholland Drive, the Linda Scott recording was lip-synched to by an auditioning actress Camilla Rhodes (Melissa George), a character who bears some resemblance to Linda Scott herself. The Linda Scott version also features as the title song of The Girl (2012) and as the opening theme for Japanese television personality Matsuko Deluxe's program Matsuko no Shiranai Sekai. This version was sampled by rapper Mac Miller on "Knock Knock", which appeared on his 2010 mixtape K.I.D.S.. The opening theme for the 1992 television series Billy featured a version of the song performed by Sonny Rollins, created especially for the series.

=== Gitte Hænning version ===
Danish singer Gitte Hænning released a version of the song in 1961. Her cover reached No. 1 in Denmark in tandem ranking with Linda Scott's version, while it reached the top 5 in Finland and No. 9 in Sweden.

==== Chart performance ====
Chart (1961)	Peak position
Denmark (Quan's Musikbureau)	1
Finland (Ilta-Sanomat)	≥5
Sweden	9

=== Other recordings ===
- Cannonball Adderley (1959)
- Jamey Aebersold
- Jessica Andersson
- Michael Ballam
- Stanley Black
- Pat Boone
- Jacob Collier
- Ray Conniff
- Country Girls – "Ranrarun ~Anata ni Muchuu~" (2016)
- Bing Crosby (recorded December 31, 1945 and included in the album Bing Crosby – Jerome Kern)
- Jack Denny and His Waldorf-Astoria Orchestra, featuring the vocals of Paul Small (1932)
- Kim Davey
- Kenny Drew
- Drifters (Sweden)
- Eddy Duchin
- Irene Dunne
- Mary Ellis (1933)
- Percy Faith
- Ferrante & Teicher
- George Feyer
- Henry Hall & the BBC Dance Orchestra
- Gitte Hænning (1961)
- Peggy King
- Dorothy Kirsten
- Mario Lanza
- London Philharmonic Orchestra
- Dave McKenna
- Marian McPartland – At The Hickory House (2009)
- Marion Marlowe
- Brad Mehldau
- Misha Mengelberg
- Joan Morris
- Sonny Rollins
- Annie Ross – Annie By Candlelight / Nocturne For Vocalists (1956)
- Jonathan Schwartz
- Linda Scott (1961)
- Margaret Whiting
- Hugo Winterhalter
