= Wheels (String-A-Longs song) =

Single by The String-A-Longs

from the album Pick a Hit
- B-side: "Tell the World": "Am I Asking Too Much?"
- Released: 1960
- Studio: Norman Petty Recording (Clovis, New Mexico)
- Genre: Instrumental
- Length: 1:55
- Label: Warwick
- Songwriters: Richard Stephens, Jimmy Torres, Norman Petty
- Producer: Norman Petty

The String-A-Longs singles chronology
"Wheels" (1960)	"Brass Buttons" (1961)

"Wheels" is the debut single by the String-A-Longs, issued in 1960. Their biggest hit single, it peaked at No. 3 on the Billboard Hot 100 and was the number 8 single of 1961 according to Billboard. The track reached number 8 in the UK singles chart. It sold over one million copies, and was awarded a gold disc.

The song has been covered by many artists, including charting versions by the Joe Loss Orchestra and Billy Vaughn Orchestra. Various other versions topped the charts in France (Marcel Amont), Belgium, the Netherlands (The Jumping Jewels) and West Germany (Billy Vaughn).

== Background ==
The tune is believed to have been originally composed as "Tell the World," although who wrote the song is disputed. One story suggests that it was written by Stephens and Torres of the String-A-Longs, who were called the Leen Teens in their early days. The song was recorded at Norman Petty Recording Studios in Clovis, New Mexico. Keith McCormack, who was the singer for the band, caught a cold and became too hoarse to sing at the recording session, so they recorded instead two instrumentals. Petty took their master recording of the song to Warwick Records who then signed them. How "Tell the World" became "Wheels" is believed to be the result of an error; according to one story, "Tell the World" was backed by Petty's composition entitled "Wheels", but the labels for the two sides were switched by accident by Warwick Records when the record was pressed, and "Tell the World" became "Wheels". However, Torres said that Petty switched the labelling of the song deliberately, and when the song became a hit, Petty claimed composition credit for a song he did not write on the basis of what was given on the label. In 1964, the parties agreed to share the credit, subsequently the Broadcast Music copyright agency recorded all three as the composers.

Another version of the origin of "Wheels" credited Norman Petty as the writer of the hit instrumental rather than Stephens and Torres. The String-A-Longs had composed a boogie instrumental titled "Wheels", while Petty's instrumental was initially called "Tell the World". The labels were then reversed, and it listed Torres and Stephens as the writers of Petty's instrumental, while Petty was credited as the writer on the flip-side. It seems that Petty was able to claim a credit for writing "Wheels" (some releases credited Johnny Flamingo and Petty as the writers, and some listed him as the only writer) but the confusion has never really been resolved.

It was originally released as "Wheels"/"Tell the World", but when both sides of the single started to take off, Warwick Record split the single into two: "Wheels"/"Am I Asking Too Much", and "Tell the World"/"For My Angel".

The String-A-Longs version sold 7 million copies, while all versions of the song sold 16 million combined. The band, however, was not properly compensated for their work as Warwick Records declared bankruptcy when the band tried to get a settlement from Warwick. The band was owed $700,000, the equivalent of $ 7 million in 2004.

== Charts ==
Chart (1961)	Peak position
Belgium (Ultratop 50 Flanders)	1
Belgium (Ultratop 50 Wallonia)	1
Canada (CHUM)	2
Norway (VG-lista)	4
Netherlands (Single Top 100)	1
UK Singles (Official Charts)	8
US Billboard Hot 100	3
West Germany (GfK)	1

== Other versions ==
In the UK a few months later the same year, the tune was recorded by the Joe Loss Orchestra as "Wheels Cha Cha", and reached No. 21. It is remembered also as the music to the Naked Ballon Dance, later used when bodybuilder Tony Holland flexed his muscles and won Opportunity Knocks.

The song became popular in France where it was recorded by Marcel Amont with French lyrics under the title "Dans le cœur de ma blonde". It topped the French and Belgian charts for many weeks in July and August 1961. Billy Vaughn's version was a No. 1 hit in Germany for 14 weeks in 1961, and in Argentina for 3 weeks. In the US, it reached No. 28.

The Dutch group the Jumping Jewels had a number-one hit single in the Netherlands with their version in 1961. Johnny Duncan released a vocal version with lyrics by Johnny Flamingo in 1963. The Ventures, Hot Butter and Jorgen Ingmann also recorded versions. A cover version by The Coctails appears on their 1996 album Live at Lounge Ax.
