= Linda Scott =

American pop singer and actress (born 1945)

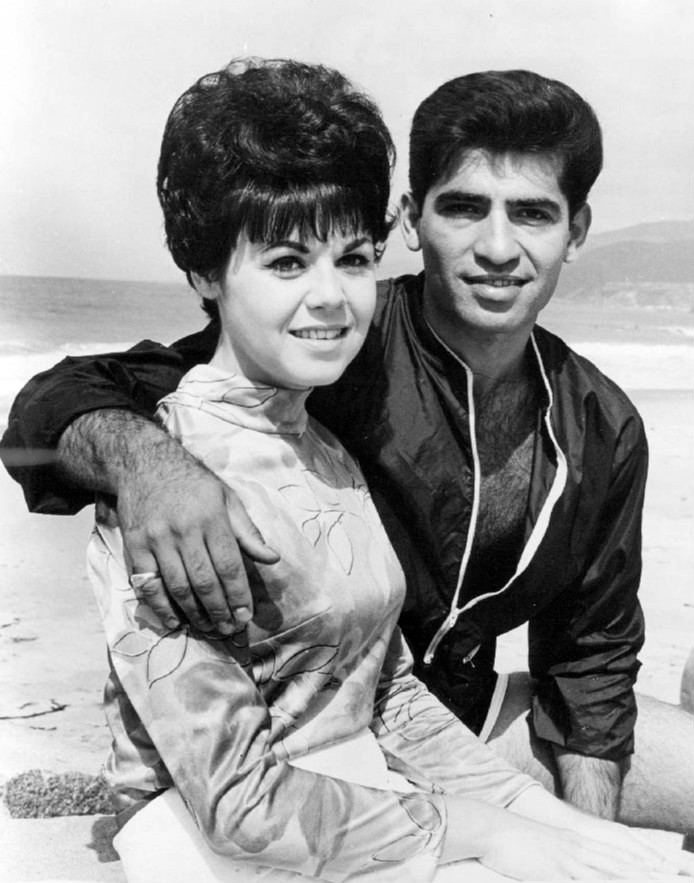
- Linda Scott and Steve Alaimo on Where the Action Is, 1966
- Born: Linda Joy Sampson; June 1, 1945 (age 80); Queens, New York, U.S.
- Occupation: Singer
- Years active: 1959–1967
- Children: 1

Linda Scott (born Linda Joy Sampson; June 1, 1945) is an American pop singer and actress who was active from the late 1950s to the early 1970s. Her biggest hit was the 1961 million-selling single "I've Told Every Little Star"., recorded and released when Scott was just 15. An occasional songwriter, Scott self-penned her second biggest hit, "Don't Bet Money Honey", which was also a top 10 US success in 1961. She went on to place twelve songs on the charts over the next four years, the last being "Who’s Been Sleeping In My Bed," inspired by the film and written by Hal David and Burt Bacharach. In 1962, she portrayed a fictionalized version of herself in the musical film Don't Knock the Twist. She retired from performing in her early twenties, later going into teaching.

== Biography ==
Born in Queens, New York, Linda Sampson was 11 years old when she moved with her family to Teaneck, New Jersey. According to syndicated columnist Dick Kleiner, when Sampson was 13, she read a local newspaper article about songwriter Jane Douglass White. Sampson wrote to White (also a New Jersey resident), the two were introduced, and White helped produce a demonstration cut which helped Sampson get attention. White also played piano on the record. She was attending junior high school in Teaneck when she auditioned to appear on Arthur Godfrey's popular CBS Radio show in 1959. After having won a place on the program, Sampson and other young performers became regular guests. During the show's run, the singer came to the attention of Epic Records and made her recording debut (as Linda Sampson) with the single "In-Between Teen".

Though still in Teaneck High School (class of ‘63), in 1961 she signed with Canadian-American Records, which had struck gold with Santo & Johnny's "Sleep Walk". The label changed her performing name to Linda Scott, producing and releasing the hit "I've Told Every Little Star," a standard written by Oscar Hammerstein II and Jerome Kern for their 1932 production Music In The Air. The track sold over one million copies, earning a gold disc for Scott.

Scott's three biggest hits came in that first year with "I've Told Every Little Star" (U.S. #3), "I Don't Know Why" (U.S. #12), and "Don't Bet Money Honey" (U.S. #9). The first two were standards, while the third was one of Scott's own compositions. Scott also charted with a song that peaked at #44 on Billboard, "Starlight, Starbright". It was mostly a regional hit in the Northeast and reached #44 in August 1961.

Scott was the showcase artist when Canadian-American started a subsidiary label, Congress Records, in 1962, and in fact both labels released new material of hers simultaneously. The following year, she sang her hit "Yessirree" which she composed for the Chubby Checker film Don't Knock the Twist.

In 1963, American Bandstand signed Scott to Dick Clark's Caravan of Stars national U.S. tour, which was scheduled to perform its fifteenth show on the night of November 22, 1963, at the Memorial Auditorium in Dallas, Texas, until the Friday evening event suddenly had to be cancelled moments after U.S. President John F. Kennedy was assassinated that afternoon as he was touring Dallas in an open car caravan.

Scott's final U.S. chart appearance was "Who's Been Sleeping In My Bed," released in January 1964, the same month that The Beatles made their first chart appearance. In 1965, she became a cast member of the variety show Where the Action Is, which she co-hosted with singer Steve Alaimo. Her last U.S. recording, "They Don't Know You", was released in 1967 on RCA Records. She continued to record as a backing vocalist (most notably on Lou Christie's 1969 hit, "I'm Gonna Make You Mine") before finally quitting show business in the early 1970s.

In 2022, Scott's hit I've Told Every Little Star was featured in an advertisement for store H&M, introducing a whole new generation of fans to her music.

== Personal life ==
Scott was stationed in Fort Sam Houston, Texas, for two years as an army laboratory technician and received a degree in Theology from Kingsway Christian College and Theological Seminary in Des Moines, Iowa, according to an interview she gave to Goldmine in 1987. During her time in the army, she met and married a fellow serviceman. The marriage produced one child in 1973 but ended in divorce. She later taught music at the Christian Academy in New York City.

The compilation CD The Complete Hits of Linda Scott was released by Eric Records in 1995, while her recording of "I've Told Every Little Star" was included in director David Lynch's film Mulholland Drive.

== Discography ==
=== Albums ===
Year	Album	Record label
1961	Starlight, Starbright	Canadian-American Records
1962	Great Scott!	Canadian-American Records
1962	Linda	Congress Records
1965	Hey, Look At Me Now!	Kapp Records

=== Singles ===
Year	Title	Peak chart positions				Record Label	B-side	Album
Year	Title	US	US AC	US R&B	UK	Record Label	B-side	Album
1959	"In-Between Teen" (as Linda Sampson)	—	—	—	—	Epic Records	"Lover of the Year"	
1961	"I've Told Every Little Star"	3	—	22	7	Canadian-American; Records	"Three Guesses"	Starlight, Starbright
1961	"Don't Bet Money Honey"	9	3	—	50	Canadian-American; Records	"Starlight, Starbright" (US #44)	
1961	"I Don't Know Why"	12	2	—	—	Canadian-American; Records	"It's All Because" (US #50)	
1962	"Yessiree"	60	—	—	—	Congress Records	"Town Crier" (US #116)	Linda
1962	"Bermuda"	70	16	—	—	Canadian-American; Records	"Lonely for You"	
1962	"Count Every Star"	41	10	—	—	Canadian-American; Records	"Land of Stars"	Starlight, Starbright
1962	"Never in a Million Years"	56	15	—	—	Congress Records	"Through the Summer"	Linda
1962	"I Left My Heart in the Balcony"	74	—	—	—	Congress Records	"Lopsided Love Affair"	
1962	"I'm So Afraid of Losing You"	—	—	—	—	Congress Records	"The Loneliest Girl in Town"	
1963	"Ain't That Fun"	—	—	—	—	Congress Records	"Sit Right Down and Write Myself a Letter"	
1963	"Let's Fall in Love"	108	—	—	—	Congress Records	"I Know It, You Know It"	
1964	"Who's Been Sleeping in My Bed?"	100	—	—	—	Congress Records	"My Heart"	
1964	"Everybody Stopped Laughing at Janie"	—	—	—	—	Congress Records	"I Envy You"	
1964	"That Old Feeling"	—	—	—	—	Kapp Records	"This Is My Prayer"	Hey, Look at Me Now!
1965	"Patch It Up"	135	—	—	—	Kapp Records	"If I Love Again"	
1965	"Don't Lose Your Head"	—	—	—	—	Kapp Records	"I'll See You in My Dreams"	
1965	"You Baby"	—	—	—	—	Kapp Records	"I Can't Get Through to You"	
1966	"Take a Walk, Bobby"	—	—	—	—	Kapp Records	"Toys"	
1967	"They Don't Know You"	—	—	—	—	RCA Victor	"Three Miles High"	

== Filmography ==
=== Film ===
Year	Title	Role	Notes
1962	Don't Knock the Twist	Linda Scott	Musical, sings "Yesiree"
