= Santo & Johnny =

American instrumental rock duo (1959–1978)

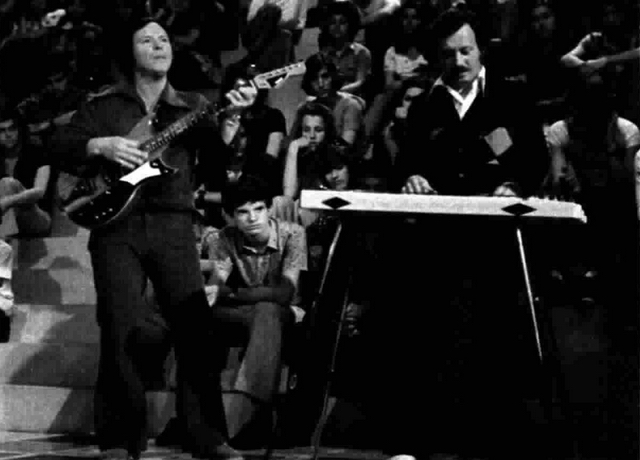
- Santo & Johnny, guests of the television program "Tutto è pop", Turin, 1972

Background information
- Origin: Brooklyn, New York, U.S.
- Genres: Rock and roll; surf rock; instrumental rock
- Years active: 1959–1978
- Label: Canadian-American
- Past members: Santo Farina – steel guitar Johnny Farina – rhythm guitar
- Website: santoandjohnny.com

Santo & Johnny were an American rock and roll instrumental duo of Italian descent from Brooklyn, New York, composed of brothers Santo Farina (born October 24, 1937) and Johnny Farina (born April 30, 1941).

They are known best for their instrumental melody "Sleep Walk", one of the biggest hits of the golden age of rock 'n' roll, which became a regional success and eventually scored the top of the Billboard pop chart when it was released nationally during 1959.

== Career ==
=== Early life ===
Santo Anthony Farina and John Steven Farina were born in Brooklyn, New York, to Anthony and Josephine Farina: Santo on October 24, 1937, and Johnny on April 30, 1941. Their father was drafted into the United States Army while they were children and was stationed for some time in Oklahoma. After hearing a steel guitar on the radio, he wrote to his wife, "I'd like the boys to learn to play this instrument".

Upon returning from World War II, the boys' father found a music teacher who gave the boys steel guitar lessons. When Santo was a teenager, he was able to get a local music store to modify an acoustic guitar, allowing him to play it like a steel guitar.

Within two years, Santo was performing in amateur shows using a new Gibson six-string steel guitar and had started receiving lessons from a steel guitar teacher who had studied in Hawaii. By the age of 14, Santo was composing songs, and formed an instrumental trio with a guitarist and drummer. This trio appeared at local dances and parties, performing both original compositions and some Hawaiian standards. With money Santo made from these performances, he bought a Fender steel guitar, one with three necks, each with eight strings. This allowed him to experiment even more, and he tried different tunings until he found ones that appealed to him.

When Johnny reached the age of 12, he began to play accompaniment to Santo on a standard electric guitar. The brothers soon formed a duo and became rather popular in school, eventually performing at events in the New York boroughs. They recorded a demo that they circulated to local New York record companies.

When Johnny turned 16, he told their father that they would be quitting school to pursue a career as "rock stars", to which their father responded "The only stars are in the sky."

The brothers wrote a song one night when they "couldn't sleep after playing a gig, and started jamming." The song was "Sleep Walk" and during September 1959 it scored at the top of the American charts.

=== Music career ===
The brothers eventually came to the attention of a music publishing company and signed a songwriter's contract and eventually landed a recording contract with Canadian-American Records. Their first release, "Sleep Walk", was credited as being composed by the two brothers plus Santo's wife, Ann, although Johnny later said that her name was put on by mistake.

"Sleep Walk" was recorded at Trinity Records in Manhattan. It reached Billboard magazine's No. 1 position for two weeks during September 1959, and earned a Gold record for Santo & Johnny. The follow-up single "Tear Drop" (spelled "Teardrop" on the album Encore) was also successful, though their long-playing record Santo & Johnny was less successful in the United States.

=== Legacy ===
"Sleep Walk" continues to be popular owing to consistent radio airplay as well as its usage for commercials, television programs, and movies. Santo & Johnny were inducted into the Steel Guitar Hall of Fame in 2002.

The duo broke up in 1976. After this split, Johnny continued to perform as a solo artist, and is still touring as of 2021. By contrast, Santo retired from the music industry in the 1970s, for reasons he did not disclose.

== Discography ==
=== Albums ===
Canadian-American Records Ltd

- Santo & Johnny (1959)
- Encore (1960)
- Hawaii (1961)
- Come On In (1962)
- Around the World... with Santo & Johnny (1962)
- Off Shore (1963)
- In the Still of the Night (1964)
- Santo & Johnny Wish You Love (1964)
- The Beatles Greatest Hits Played by Santo & Johnny (1964)
- Mucho (1965)
- Santo y Johnny en México (1965?)
- Love Is Blue (1968)
- Hush (1970)
- Guide To Love (1971)
- Europa (1977)

Imperial

- The Brilliant Guitar Sounds of Santo & Johnny (1967)
- Golden Guitars (1968)
- On the Road Again (1968)
- The Best That Could Happen (1969)

Black Tulip

- The Original Recordings

Dischi Ricordi

- Music For Your Dreams (1982)

Aniraf Record Co.

- Christmas Mine – Johnny Farina (2012)
- Pure Steel (2007) Johnny Farina
- Christmas Mine (2008) Johnny Farina
- Italian Being Served (2009) Johnny Farina
- Christmas Mine – Johnny Farina (reissued 2012)

PAUSA (aka: Pause) Records

- Santo & Johnny (1976)

=== Singles ===
Year	"A" Side	"B" Side	US	UK	AU	Label
1959	"Sleep Walk"	"All Night Diner"	1	22	10	Canadian-American 103
1959	"Tear Drop"	"The Long Walk Home"	23	50	28	Canadian-American 107
1960	"Caravan"	"Summertime"	48	—	22	Canadian-American 111
1960	"Sea Shells"	"Hop Scotch"	90	—	—	Canadian-American 114
1960	"The Breeze and I"	"Lazy Day"	109	—	—	Canadian-American 115
1960	"Annie"	"Lost Love"	—	—	—	Canadian-American 118
1960	"Twistin' Bells"	"Bullseye!"	49	—	42	Canadian-American 120
1961	"Theme from Come September"	"The Long Walk Home"	—	—	—	Canadian-American 128
1961	"Birmingham"	"The Mouse"	—	—	—	Canadian-American 131
1962	"Stage to Cimarron"	"Spanish Harlem"	101	—	—	Canadian-American 137
1962	"Three Cabelleros"	"Step Aside"	—	—	—	Canadian American 141
1962	"Tokyo Twilight"	"Miserlou"	—	—	—	Canadian-American 144
1963	"On Your Mark"	"Manhattan"	—	—	—	Canadian-American 151
1963	"The Wandering Sea"	"Manhattan Spiritual"	—	—	—	Canadian-American 155
1963	"Love Letters In The Sand"	"Lido Beach"	—	—	—	Canadian American 161
1964	"In The Still of the Night"	"Song For Rosemary"	—	—	—	Canadian-American 164
1964	"A Thousand Miles Away"	"Road Block"	122	—	—	Canadian-American 167
1964	"Sugar Stroll"	"Rattler"	—	—	—	Canadian-American 174
1964	"A Hard Day's Night"	"And I Love Her"	—	—	—	Canadian-American 177
1964	"A Hard Day's Night"	"The Beatle Stomp"	—	—	—	Canadian-American 177
1964	"Goldfinger"	"Sleepwalk"	—	—	—	Canadian-American 182
1965	"Mucho Tempo"	"Brazilian Summer"	—	—	—	Canadian-American 189
1965	"Off Shore"	(One sided record)	—	—	—	Canadian-American 190
1965	"Watermelon Man"	"Return To Naples"	—	—	—	Canadian-American 194
1965	"The Young World"	"Come With Me"	—	—	—	Canadian-American 204
1965	"Thunderball"	"Mister Kiss Kiss Bang Bang"	—	—	—	United Artists UA970
1967	"Live for Life"	"See You in September"	—	—	—	Imperial 66269
1968	"Sleepwalk 68"	"It Must Be Him"	—	—	—	Imperial 66292
1969	"Isadora"	"Street Of Dark Flowers"	—	—	—	Canadian American 7042
1973	"Piedone Lo Sbirro (Flat Feet)"	"Moon Dog"	—	—	—	Produttori Associati/Canadian-American 7054
