= Ral Donner =

American pop singer (1943–1984)

- Born: Ralph Stuart Emanuel Donner; February 10, 1943; Norwood Park, Chicago, Illinois, U.S.
- Died: April 6, 1984 (aged 41) Chicago, U.S.
- Genres: Rock and roll
- Occupation: Singer

Ralph Stuart Emanuel Donner (February 10, 1943 – April 6, 1984) was an American rock and roll singer. He scored several pop hits in the US in the early 1960s, and had a voice similar to Elvis Presley. His best known song is his 1961 top ten hit, "You Don't Know What You've Got (Until You Lose It)".

== Biography ==
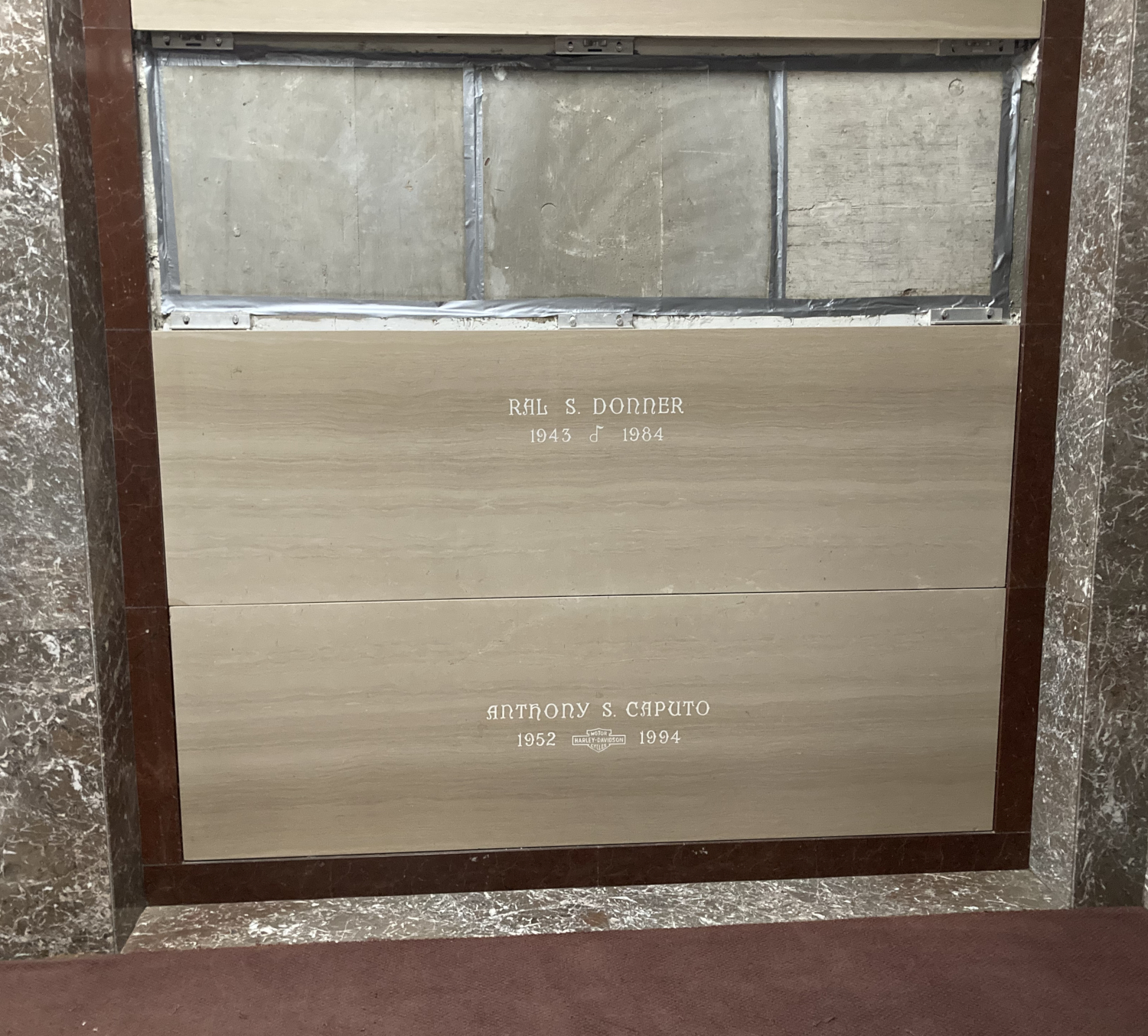
Donner's grave at Acacia Park Cemetery

Ralph Donner was born in Norwood Park, Chicago, Illinois, United States, and sang in church as a child. He sang in local talent shows as a teen, and formed two of his own bands, the Rockin' Five and the Gents, in high school. The Rockin' Five played with Sammy Davis Jr. on Chicago television at one point in the late 1950s. In 1959, he appeared on Alan Freed's Big Beat program, and released a single with the Gents; soon after, the Gents toured with The Sparkletones.

Donner recorded a cover of Presley's "The Girl of My Best Friend", along with a backing band called the Starfires. After being picked up by Gone Records, Donner re-recorded and re-released the tune, which became a nationwide hit; some listeners even thought that the cover was Presley himself. His next single, "You Don't Know What You've Got (Until You Lose It)", became his biggest, and only Top Ten, hit on the Billboard chart in the United States, peaking at No. 4. The track peaked at No. 25 in the UK Singles Chart in 1961. He managed a few more hits, the last of which was in 1962.

In the mid-1960s, Donner recorded for Reprise Records and Red Bird Records, but saw little further success. He played little in the 1970s, recording occasionally, but saw some rekindled interest in his music after Presley's death. In 1981, he provided voice-over narration (in the voice of Elvis) in the film This Is Elvis.

Donner died of lung cancer on April 6, 1984. He was interred in the mausoleum of Acacia Park Cemetery in Norwood Park Township.

Donner was cited by Robert Plant as an influence at the 1995 induction of Led Zeppelin into the Rock and Roll Hall of Fame.

== Discography ==
=== Singles ===
List of singles, with selected chart positions
Year	Titles (A-side, B-side) Both sides from same album except where indicated	Label & number	Peak chart positions			Album
Year	Titles (A-side, B-side) Both sides from same album except where indicated	Label & number	US	CAN	UK	Album
1959	"That's All Right With Me" b/w "Tell Me Why"	Scottie 1310	—	—	—	Ral Donner Ray Smith & Bobby Dale
1961	"Girl Of My Best Friend" b/w "It's Been A Long Long Time" (Non-album track)	Gone 5102	19	14	—	Takin' Care Of Business
1961	"And Then" b/w "To Love"	Gone 5108	—	—	—	Non-album tracks
1961	"You Don't Know What You've Got (Until You Lose It)" b/w "So Close To Heaven" (Non-album track)	Gone 5108 (Same number used as above single)	4	10	25	Takin' Care Of Business
1961	"Please Don't Go" b/w "I Didn't Figure On Him (To Come Back)"	Gone 5114	39	—	—	Takin' Care Of Business
1961	"School Of Heartbreakers" b/w "Because We're Young" (Non-album track)	Gone 5119	—	—	—	Takin' Care Of Business
1961	"She's Everything (I Wanted You To Be)"; Original B-side: "Will You Love Me In Heaven"; Later B-side: "Because We're Young"	Gone 5121	18	12	—	Non-album tracks
1962	"(What A Sad Way) To Love Somebody" b/w "Will You Love Me In Heaven"	Gone 5125	74	—	—	Non-album tracks
1962	"Loveless Life"^{[A]} b/w "Bells Of Love"	Gone 5129	117	—	—	Non-album tracks
1962	"To Love" b/w "Sweetheart"	Gone 5133	—	—	—	Non-album tracks
1962	"Second Miracle (Of Christmas)" b/w "(Things That Make Up) Christmas Day"	Reprise 20135	—	—	—	Non-album tracks
1963	"I Got Burned"^{[B]} b/w "A Tear In My Eye"	Reprise 20141	124	—	—	Non-album tracks
1963	"Loneliness Of A Star" b/w "And Then"	Tau 105	—	—	—	Non-album tracks
1963	"I Wish This Night Would Never End" b/w "Don't Put Your Heart In His Hand"	Reprise 20176	—	—	—	Non-album tracks
1963	"Run Little Linda" b/w "Beyond The Heartbreak (But Still In Love)"	Reprise 20192	—	—	—	Non-album tracks
1965	"You Finally Said Something Good" b/w "Poison Ivy League"	Fontana 1502	—	—	—	Non-album tracks
1965	"Good Lovin'" b/w "The Other Side Of Me"	Fontana 1515	—	—	—	Non-album tracks
1966	"Love Isn't Like That" b/w "It Will Only Make Me Love You More"	Red Bird 10-057	—	—	—	Non-album tracks
1968	"(If I Had My) Life To Live Over" b/w "Lost"	Mid-Eagle 101	—	—	—	An Evening With Ral Donner
1968	"If I Promise" b/w "Just A Little Sunshine (In The Rain)"	Rising Sons 714	—	—	—	Non-album tracks
1971	"(All Of A Sudden) My Heart Sings" b/w "Lovin' Place"	M.J. 222	—	—	—	Non-album tracks
1972	"Don't Let It Slip Away" b/w "Wait A Minute Now"	Sunlight 1006	—	—	—	Non-album tracks
1974	"The Wedding Song" b/w "Godfather, Per Me"	Chicago Fire 7402	—	—	—	An Evening With Ral Donner
1976	"The Wedding Song" b/w "So Much Lovin'"	Mid-Eagle 275	—	—	—	An Evening With Ral Donner
1978	"The Day The Beat Stopped" b/w "Rock On Me"	Thunder 7801	—	—	—	Non-album tracks
"—" denotes releases that did not chart.

== Notes ==
- A "Loveless Life" did not enter the Billboard Hot 100 but peaked on the Bubbling Under Hot 100 Singles chart at number 17.
- B "I Got Burned" did not enter the Billboard Hot 100 but peaked on the Bubbling Under Hot 100 Singles chart at number 24.
