= Little Caesar & the Romans =

1960s American vocal group

Little Caesar & the Romans were an American musical group from Los Angeles, California, United States, active briefly in the 1960s.

The Romans minus Little Caesar began recording in 1959 as The Cubans, but changed their name to The Upfronts after the Bay of Pigs Invasion. They had three hits: the first and biggest was the nostalgic tune "Those Oldies but Goodies (Remind Me of You)", a No. 9 Pop and No. 28 R&B hit in 1961. They appeared on the television show American Bandstand on 23 May 1961, performing their hit. It was written by Nick Curinga and Paul Politi. Charles Wright, the leader of Charles Wright & the Watts 103rd Street Rhythm Band, at the time was A&R Director for Del-Fi Records. Wright played both piano and bass on the original "hit" recording of "Those Oldies But Goodies (Reminds Me of You)". The follow-up, "Hully Gully Again", hit No. 54, and subsequent release "Memories of Those Oldies but Goodies" bubbled under at No. 101. They also released an album, Memories of Those Oldies But Goodies, Volume 1 (1961), on Del-Fi Records.

David Johnson served a prison term beginning shortly after "Hully Gully Again", and when he was released, he formed a group using the name Little Caesar and the Romans. They worked briefly in the mid-1970s, performing at Art Laboe's Club on the Sunset Strip in California. Singer Rickie Lee Jones was a backup singer for that show.

The group's live act sometimes included wearing togas on stage, and on Dick Clark's American Bandstand television show. They broke up in 1962, at least partly due to an argument between lead singer Carl Burnett and member David Johnson (who performed the spoken-word portion of "Those Oldies but Goodies") as to which of them should be called Little Caesar.

== After split ==
In 1975, David Johnson's formation of Little Caesar and The Romans recorded a single called "Disco Hully Gully" and they toured as Marvin Gaye's opening act.

David Johnson Jr. who was born on 16 June 1934 in Chicago, Illinois, to Alice and David Johnson Sr., died on 25 October 2018, at the age of 84.

== Members ==
- Carl Burnett - lead singer
- Johnny Simmons - first tenor
- Early Harris - second tenor
- David Johnson - baritone
- Leroy Saunders - bass

== Discography ==
=== Albums ===
| Year | Album | Billboard 200 | Record Label |
|---|---|---|---|
| 1961 | Memories Of Those Oldies But Goodies (DFLP 1218 (12/61)) | - | Del-Fi Records |

- LP track list: "Those Oldies but Goodies (Remind Me of You)" * "I Need You So" * "Ten Commandments Of Love" * "Little Star" * "Adorable" * "Memories Of Those Oldies But Goodies" * "Hully Gully Again" * "Work With Me Annie"/"Annie Had A Baby" * "Searchin'" * "Fever" * "CC Rider"
- The following originally unreleased songs from the LP sessions were later released on CD Toga! Toga! Toga! (DFCD 71262 (04/98)) alongside all their singles and original LP tracks: "Quarter To Three" * "Twelve Months Of The Year" * "Memories" * "Betty Jean" * "Three Weeks Ago Today"

=== Singles ===
| Year | Title | Peak chart positions | | B-side | Record Label |
| Year | Title | US | US R&B | B-side | Record Label |
|---|---|---|---|---|---|
| 1961 | "Those Oldies but Goodies (Remind Me of You)" | 9 | 28 | "She Don't Wanna Dance" (DF4158 (03/61)) | Del-Fi Records |
| 1961 | "Hully Gully Again" | 54 | - | "Frankie & Johnny" (DF4164 (07/61)) | Del-Fi Records |
| 1961 | "Memories Of Those Oldies But Goodies" | 101 | - | "Fever" (DF4166 (08/61)) | Del-Fi Records |
| 1961 | "CC Rider" | - | - | "Ten Commandments Of Love" (DF4170 (10/61)) | Del-Fi Records |
| 1962 | "Popeye One More Time" | - | - | "Yoyo Yo Yoyo" (DF4176 (02/62)) | Del-Fi Records |
