= Canadian-American Records =

Record label

- Parent company: Caprice International
- Founded: 1957
- Founder: Leonard Zimmer
- Genre: Various
- Country of origin: U.S., Canada
- Location: Pennsylvania, Winnipeg
- Official website: canadianamericanrecords.net

Canadian-American Records is a record label founded by Leonard Zimmer and based in New York City and Winnipeg, Manitoba. The most popular artists for the label were the duo of Santo & Johnny and the singer Linda Scott. The label is based in Lititz, Pennsylvania.
