= List of Cash Box Top 100 number-one singles of 1961 =

These are the songs that reached number one on the Top 100 Best Sellers chart in 1961 as published by Cash Box magazine.

Issue date	Song	Artist
January 7	Wonderland by Night	Bert Kaempfert & Orchestra
January 14	Exodus	Ferrante and Teicher
January 21	Exodus	Ferrante and Teicher
January 28	Will You Love Me Tomorrow	The Shirelles
February 4	Will You Love Me Tomorrow	The Shirelles
February 11	Calcutta	Lawrence Welk & Orchestra
February 18	Calcutta	Lawrence Welk & Orchestra
February 25	Calcutta	Lawrence Welk & Orchestra
March 4	Calcutta	Lawrence Welk & Orchestra
March 11	Pony Time	Chubby Checker
March 18	Surrender	Elvis Presley
March 25	Surrender	Elvis Presley
April 1	Blue Moon	The Marcels
April 8	Blue Moon	The Marcels
April 15	Blue Moon	The Marcels
April 22	Runaway	Del Shannon
April 29	Runaway	Del Shannon
May 6	Mother-in-Law	Ernie K-Doe
May 13	Mother-in-Law	Ernie K-Doe
May 20	Runaway	Del Shannon
May 27	Mother-in-Law	Ernie K-Doe
June 3	Running Scared	Roy Orbison
June 10	Travelin' Man	Ricky Nelson
June 17	Travelin' Man	Ricky Nelson
June 24	Travelin' Man	Ricky Nelson
July 1	Quarter To Three	Gary U.S. Bonds
July 8	Quarter To Three	Gary U.S. Bonds
July 15	Quarter To Three	Gary U.S. Bonds
July 22	Tossin' and Turnin'	Bobby Lewis
July 29	Tossin' and Turnin'	Bobby Lewis
August 5	Tossin' and Turnin'	Bobby Lewis
August 12	Tossin' and Turnin'	Bobby Lewis
August 19	Michael	The Highwaymen
August 26	Michael	The Highwaymen
September 2	Michael	The Highwaymen
September 9	Michael	The Highwaymen
September 16	Take Good Care Of My Baby	Bobby Vee
September 23	Take Good Care Of My Baby	Bobby Vee
September 30	Take Good Care Of My Baby	Bobby Vee
October 7	Crying	Roy Orbison
October 14	Hit the Road Jack	Ray Charles
October 21	Runaround Sue	Dion
October 28	Runaround Sue	Dion
November 4	Big Bad John	Jimmy Dean
November 11	Big Bad John	Jimmy Dean
November 18	Big Bad John	Jimmy Dean
November 25	Big Bad John	Jimmy Dean
December 2	Big Bad John	Jimmy Dean
December 9	The Lion Sleeps Tonight	The Tokens
December 16	The Lion Sleeps Tonight	The Tokens
December 23	The Lion Sleeps Tonight	The Tokens
December 30	The Lion Sleeps Tonight	The Tokens

== See also ==
- 1961 in music
- List of Hot 100 number-one singles of 1961 (U.S.)
