= Billboard year-end top 50 R&B singles of 1961 =

Billboard Top R&B Records of 1961 is the year-end chart compiled by Billboard magazine ranking the top rhythm and blues singles of 1961.

R&B rank	Pop rank	Title	Artist(s)	Label
1	1	"Tossin' and Turnin'"	Bobby Lewis	Beltone
2	65	"It's Gonna Work Out Fine"	Ike & Tina Turner	Sue
3	NR	"Don't Cry No More"	Bobby Bland	Duke
4	NR	"Hide Away"	Freddy King	Federal
5	24	"Shop Around"	The Miracles	Tamla
6	6	"My True Story"	The Jive Five	Beltone
7	34	"I Like It Like That"	Chris Kenner	Instant
8	63	"Stand by Me"	Ben E. King	Atco
9	21	"Mother-in-Law"	Ernie K-Doe	Minit
10	NR	"All in My Mind"	Maxine Brown	Nomar
11	NR	"I Pity the Fool"	Bobby Bland	Duke
12	NR	"Every Beat of My Heart"	Gladys Knight & the Pips	Vee Jay
13	NR	"Baby You're Right"	James Brown	King
14	15	"Last Night"	The Mar-Keys	Satellite
15	NR	"For My Baby"	Brook Benton	Mercury
16	25	"Boll Weevil Song"	Brook Benton	Mercury
17	19	"Hit the Road Jack"	Ray Charles	ABC-Paramount
18	NR	"I Don't Mind"	James Brown	King
19	53	"Ya Ya"	Lee Dorsey	Fury
20	16	"Will You Love Me Tomorrow"	The Shirelles	Scepter
21	60	"One Mint Julep"	Ray Charles	Impulse
22	40	"Blue Moon"	The Marcels	Colpix
23	31	"Quarter to Three"	Gary U.S. Bonds	Le Grand
24	NR	"At Last"	Etta James	Argo
25	9	"Raindrops"	Dee Clark	Vee Jay
26	7	"Pony Time"	Chubby Checker	Parkway
27	NR	"Bright Lights, Big City"	Jimmy Reed	Vee Jay
28	41	"Daddy's Home"	Shep and the Limelites	Hull
29	78	"Think Twice"	Brook Benton	Mercury
30	NR	"Please Mr. Postman"	The Marvelettes	Tamla
31	NR	"I Don't Want to Cry!"	Chuck Jackson	Wand
32	62	"Gee Whiz (Look at His Eyes)"	Carla Thomas	Atlantic
33	NR	"You Can Have Her"	Roy Hamilton	Epic
34	NR	"A Little Bit of Soap"	The Jarmels	Laurie
35	NR	"Trust in Me"	Etta James	Argo
36	46	"Runaround Sue"	Dion	Laurie
37	NR	"Driving Wheel"	Little Junior Parker	Duke
38	82	"Let the Four Winds Blow"	Fats Domino	Imperial
39	81	"Mama Said"	The Shirelles	Scepter
40	NR	"Exodus"	Eddie Harris	Vee Jay
41	NR	"Lonesome Whistle Blues"	Freddy King	Federal
42	NR	"Take My Love"	Little Willie John	King
43	NR	"The Switch-a-Roo"	Hank Ballard and The Midnighters	King
44	22	"Bristol Stomp"	The Dovells	Parkway
45	NR	"Look in My Eyes"	The Chantels	Carlton
46	14	"Dedicated to the One I Love"	The Shirelles	Scepter
47	NR	"San-Ho-Zay"	Freddy King	Federal
48	NR	"Don't Cry Baby"	Etta James	Argo
49	NR	"Find Another Girl"	Jerry Butler	Vee Jay
50	NR	"That's What Girls Are Made For"	The Spinners	Tri-Phi

== See also ==
- List of Hot R&B Sides number ones of 1961
- Billboard Year-End Hot 100 singles of 1961
- 1961 in music
