= List of Billboard number-one albums of 1961 =

These are the number-one albums in the United States per Billboard magazine during the year 1961. From May 25, 1959 through July 1963, separate charts existed for albums in mono and stereo formats. Beginning 1961, these charts were called Top LP's - Action Albums - Monaural and Top LP's - Action Albums - Stereophonic. From the beginning of April 1961, the names changed to Top LP's - 150 Best-Selling Mono LP's and Top LP's - 50 Best-Selling Stereo LP's. On May 8, 1961, the mono chart's name was changed again to Top LP's - 150 Best-Selling Monaural LP's.

== Chart history ==
Key
†	Indicates best performing album of 1961

Chart history
Issue date	Mono			Stereo			Ref.
Issue date	Album	Artist(s)	Label	Album	Artist(s)	Label	Ref.
January 9	The Button-Down Mind Strikes Back!	Bob Newhart	Warner Bros.	G.I. Blues	Elvis Presley / Soundtrack	RCA Victor	
January 16	Wonderland by Night	Bert Kaempfert	Decca	G.I. Blues	Elvis Presley / Soundtrack	RCA Victor	
January 23	Wonderland by Night	Bert Kaempfert	Decca	Exodus	Ernest Gold / Soundtrack	RCA Victor	
January 30	Wonderland by Night	Bert Kaempfert	Decca	Exodus	Ernest Gold / Soundtrack	RCA Victor	
February 6	Exodus	Ernest Gold / Soundtrack	RCA Victor	Exodus	Ernest Gold / Soundtrack	RCA Victor	
February 13	Wonderland by Night	Bert Kaempfert	Decca	Exodus	Ernest Gold / Soundtrack	RCA Victor	
February 20	Wonderland by Night	Bert Kaempfert	Decca	Exodus	Ernest Gold / Soundtrack	RCA Victor	
February 27	Exodus	Ernest Gold / Soundtrack	RCA Victor	Exodus	Ernest Gold / Soundtrack	RCA Victor	
March 6	Exodus	Ernest Gold / Soundtrack	RCA Victor	Exodus	Ernest Gold / Soundtrack	RCA Victor	
March 13	Calcutta!	Lawrence Welk	Dot	Calcutta!	Lawrence Welk	Dot	
March 20	Calcutta!	Lawrence Welk	Dot	Calcutta!	Lawrence Welk	Dot	
March 27	Calcutta!	Lawrence Welk	Dot	Calcutta!	Lawrence Welk	Dot	
April 3	G.I. Blues	Elvis Presley / Soundtrack	RCA Victor	Calcutta!	Lawrence Welk	Dot	
April 10	Calcutta!	Lawrence Welk	Dot	Calcutta!	Lawrence Welk	Dot	
April 17	Calcutta!	Lawrence Welk	Dot	Calcutta!	Lawrence Welk	Dot	
April 24	Calcutta!	Lawrence Welk	Dot	Calcutta!	Lawrence Welk	Dot	
May 1	Calcutta!	Lawrence Welk	Dot	Calcutta!	Lawrence Welk	Dot	
May 8	Calcutta!	Lawrence Welk	Dot	Calcutta!	Lawrence Welk	Dot	
May 15	G.I. Blues	Elvis Presley / Soundtrack	RCA Victor	Calcutta!	Lawrence Welk	Dot	
May 22	G.I. Blues	Elvis Presley / Soundtrack	RCA Victor	Exodus	Ernest Gold / Soundtrack	RCA Victor	
May 29	G.I. Blues	Elvis Presley / Soundtrack	RCA Victor	Calcutta!	Lawrence Welk	Dot	
June 5	Camelot †	Original Broadway Cast	Columbia	Exodus	Ernest Gold / Soundtrack	RCA Victor	
June 12	Camelot †	Original Broadway Cast	Columbia	Exodus	Ernest Gold / Soundtrack	RCA Victor	
June 19	Camelot †	Original Broadway Cast	Columbia	Exodus	Ernest Gold / Soundtrack	RCA Victor	
June 26	Camelot †	Original Broadway Cast	Columbia	Exodus	Ernest Gold / Soundtrack	RCA Victor	
July 3	Camelot †	Original Broadway Cast	Columbia	Exodus	Ernest Gold / Soundtrack	RCA Victor	
July 10	Camelot †	Original Broadway Cast	Columbia	Exodus	Ernest Gold / Soundtrack	RCA Victor	
July 17	Carnival!	Original Broadway Cast	MGM	Stars for a Summer Night	Various Artists	Columbia	
July 24	Stars for a Summer Night	Various Artists	Columbia	Stars for a Summer Night	Various Artists	Columbia	
July 31	Stars for a Summer Night	Various Artists	Columbia	Stars for a Summer Night	Various Artists	Columbia	
August 7	Stars for a Summer Night	Various Artists	Columbia	Stars for a Summer Night	Various Artists	Columbia	
August 14	Stars for a Summer Night	Various Artists	Columbia	Stars for a Summer Night	Various Artists	Columbia	
August 21	Something for Everybody	Elvis Presley	RCA Victor	Stars for a Summer Night	Various Artists	Columbia	
August 28	Something for Everybody	Elvis Presley	RCA Victor	Stars for a Summer Night	Various Artists	Columbia	
September 4	Something for Everybody	Elvis Presley	RCA Victor	Stars for a Summer Night	Various Artists	Columbia	
September 11	Judy at Carnegie Hall	Judy Garland	Capitol	Stars for a Summer Night	Various Artists	Columbia	
September 18	Judy at Carnegie Hall	Judy Garland	Capitol	Judy at Carnegie Hall	Judy Garland	Capitol	
September 25	Judy at Carnegie Hall	Judy Garland	Capitol	Judy at Carnegie Hall	Judy Garland	Capitol	
October 2	Judy at Carnegie Hall	Judy Garland	Capitol	Judy at Carnegie Hall	Judy Garland	Capitol	
October 9	Judy at Carnegie Hall	Judy Garland	Capitol	Judy at Carnegie Hall	Judy Garland	Capitol	
October 16	Judy at Carnegie Hall	Judy Garland	Capitol	Judy at Carnegie Hall	Judy Garland	Capitol	
October 23	Judy at Carnegie Hall	Judy Garland	Capitol	Judy at Carnegie Hall	Judy Garland	Capitol	
October 30	Judy at Carnegie Hall	Judy Garland	Capitol	Judy at Carnegie Hall	Judy Garland	Capitol	
November 6	Judy at Carnegie Hall	Judy Garland	Capitol	Judy at Carnegie Hall	Judy Garland	Capitol	
November 13	Judy at Carnegie Hall	Judy Garland	Capitol	Judy at Carnegie Hall	Judy Garland	Capitol	
November 20	Judy at Carnegie Hall	Judy Garland	Capitol	Stereo 35/MM	Enoch Light & the Light Brigade	Command	
November 27	Judy at Carnegie Hall	Judy Garland	Capitol	Stereo 35/MM	Enoch Light & the Light Brigade	Command	
December 4	Judy at Carnegie Hall	Judy Garland	Capitol	Stereo 35/MM	Enoch Light & the Light Brigade	Command	
December 11	Blue Hawaii	Elvis Presley / Soundtrack	RCA Victor	Stereo 35/MM	Enoch Light & the Light Brigade	Command	
December 18	Blue Hawaii	Elvis Presley / Soundtrack	RCA Victor	Stereo 35/MM	Enoch Light & the Light Brigade	Command	
December 25	Blue Hawaii	Elvis Presley / Soundtrack	RCA Victor	Stereo 35/MM	Enoch Light & the Light Brigade	Command	

== See also ==
- 1961 in music
- List of number-one albums (United States)
