= Seemann (surname) =

Seemann is a surname. Notable people with the surname include:

- Berthold Carl Seemann (1825–1871), German botanist
- Carl Seemann (1910–1983), German pianist and 1978 recipient of the Reinhold-Schneider-Preis
- Finn Seemann (1944–1985), Norwegian footballer
- Franz Seemann (1887–1963), German art director for The Beaver Coat (1928 film)
- Horst Seemann (1937–2000), German film director and screenwriter
- Lindsay Seemann (born 1992), Canadian swimmer
- "Seemann" (Lolita song), released 1960 by Austrian singer Lolita
- "Seemann" (Rammstein song), a 1996 single by the German band Rammstein

== See also ==
- Seeman (disambiguation)
- Zeeman (disambiguation)
