= List of artists who have achieved simultaneous number-one single and album in the United States =

A number of artists have achieved number-one singles and albums simultaneously on the Billboard charts in the United States. The list includes only those charting on the primary top singles/songs and top albums charts, presently the Billboard Hot 100 and the Billboard 200.

== List of qualifying artists ==
=== 1940s ===
- Vaughn Monroe – "Let It Snow! Let It Snow! Let It Snow!" and On The Moon-Beam on January 26, 1946 (four weeks)

=== 1950s ===
- Mario Lanza – "Be My Love" and The Toast of New Orleans on March 10, 1951 (one week)
- Elvis Presley – "Heartbreak Hotel" / "I Was the One" and Elvis Presley on May 5, 1956 (eight and six weeks, respectively)
- Elvis Presley – "(Let Me Be Your) Teddy Bear" / "Loving You" and Loving You on July 29, 1957 (five weeks)
- Elvis Presley – "Jailhouse Rock" / "Treat Me Nice" and Elvis' Christmas Album on December 16, 1957 (one week)

=== 1960s ===
- Elvis Presley – "Are You Lonesome Tonight?" and G.I. Blues on December 5, 1960^{a} (one week) and December 19, 1960^{a} (three weeks)
- Bert Kaempfert – "Wonderland by Night" and Wonderland by Night on January 16, 1961^{a} (one week)
- Elvis Presley – "Good Luck Charm" and Blue Hawaii on April 21, 1962^{a} (two weeks)
- Ray Charles – "I Can't Stop Loving You" and Modern Sounds in Country and Western Music on June 23, 1962^{a} (two weeks)
- Stevie Wonder – "Fingertips" and Recorded Live: The 12 Year Old Genius on August 24, 1963 (one week)
- The Singing Nun – "Dominique" and The Singing Nun on December 7, 1963 (four weeks)
- The Beatles – "I Want to Hold Your Hand" and Meet the Beatles! on February 15, 1964 (five weeks)
- The Beatles – "She Loves You" and Meet the Beatles! on March 21, 1964 (2 weeks)
- The Beatles – "Can't Buy Me Love and Meet the Beatles! on April 4, 1964 (one week)
- The Beatles – "Can't Buy Me Love" and The Beatles' Second Album on May 2, 1964 (one week)
- The Beatles – "Love Me Do" and The Beatles Second Album on May 30, 1964 (one week)
- The Beatles – "A Hard Day's Night" and A Hard Day's Night on August 1, 1964 (two weeks)
- The Beatles – "I Feel Fine" and Beatles '65 on January 9, 1965 (one week)
- The Beatles – "Help!" and Help! on September 11, 1965 (two weeks)
- The Beatles – "We Can Work It Out" and Rubber Soul on January 8, 1966 (two weeks)
- SSgt. Barry Sadler – "Ballad of the Green Berets" and Ballad of the Green Berets on March 5, 1966 (four weeks)
- The Mamas & the Papas – "Monday, Monday" on If You Can Believe Your Eyes and Ears on May 21, 1966 (one week)
- The Monkees – "I'm a Believer and The Monkees on December 31, 1966 (six weeks)
- The Monkees – "I'm a Believer" and More of The Monkees on February 11, 1967 (one week)
- The Beatles – "All You Need is Love" and Sgt. Pepper's Lonely Hearts Club Band and August 19, 1967 (one week)
- The Monkees – "Daydream Believer" and Pisces, Aquarius, Capricorn & Jones Ltd. on December 2, 1967 (four weeks)
- The Beatles – "Hello, Goodbye" and Magical Mystery Tour on January 6, 1968 (two weeks)
- Paul Mauriat – "Love is Blue" and Blooming Hits on March 2, 1968 (two weeks)
- Simon & Garfunkel – "Mrs. Robinson" and Bookends on June 1, 1968 (two weeks)
- Simon & Garfunkel – "Mrs. Robinson" and The Graduate on June 15, 1968 (one week)
- The Beatles – "Come Together" and Abbey Road on November 29, 1969 (one week)

=== 1970s ===
- Simon & Garfunkel – "Bridge over Troubled Water" and Bridge over Troubled Water on March 7, 1970 (five weeks)
- The Beatles – "The Long and Winding Road" and Let It Be on June 13, 1970 (two weeks)
- George Harrison – "My Sweet Lord" / "Isn't It a Pity" and All Things Must Pass on January 2, 1971 (three weeks)
- Janis Joplin – "Me and Bobby McGee" and Pearl on March 20, 1971 (two weeks)
- The Rolling Stones – "Brown Sugar" and Sticky Fingers on May 29, 1971 (two weeks)
- Carole King – "It's Too Late" / "I Feel the Earth Move" and Tapestry on June 19, 1971 (six weeks)
- Rod Stewart – "Maggie May" / "Reason to Believe" and Every Picture Tells a Story on October 2, 1971 (four weeks)
- Sly and the Family Stone – "Family Affair" and There's a Riot Goin' On on December 18, 1971 (one week)
- Don McLean – "American Pie" and American Pie on January 22, 1972 (three weeks)
- Neil Young – "Heart of Gold" and Harvest on March 18, 1972 (one week)
- America – "A Horse With No Name" and America on March 25, 1972 (three weeks)
- Roberta Flack – "The First Time Ever I Saw Your Face" and First Take on April 29, 1972 (four weeks)
- Carly Simon – "You're So Vain" and No Secrets on January 13, 1973 (two weeks)
- Wings – "My Love" and "Red Rose Speedway" on June 2, 1973 (three weeks)
- George Harrison – "Give Me Love (Give Me Peace on Earth)" and Living in the Material World on June 30, 1973 (one week)
- The Rolling Stones – "Angie" and Goats Head Soup on October 20, 1973 (one week)
- John Denver – "Sunshine on My Shoulders" and John Denver's Greatest Hits on March 30, 1974 (one week)
- Wings – "Band on the Run" and Band on the Run on June 8, 1974 (one week)
- Gordon Lightfoot – "Sundown" and Sundown on June 29, 1974 (one week)
- Olivia Newton-John – "I Honestly Love You" and If You Love Me, Let Me Know on October 12, 1974 (one week)
- John Lennon – "Whatever Gets You thru the Night" and Walls and Bridges on November 16, 1974 (one week)
- Elton John – Lucy in the Sky with Diamonds" and Elton John's Greatest Hits on January 4, 1975 (two weeks)
- Ohio Players – "Fire" and Fire on February 8, 1975 (one week)
- Linda Ronstadt – "You're No Good" and Heart Like a Wheel on February 15, 1975 (one week)
- Average White Band – "Pick Up the Pieces and AWB on February 22, 1975 (one week)
- Earth, Wind & Fire – "Shining Star" and That's the Way of the World on May 24, 1975 (one week)
- Wings – "Listen to What the Man Said" and Venus and Mars on July 19, 1975 (one week)
- Eagles – "One of These Nights" and One of These Nights on August 2, 1975 (one week)
- Elton John – "Island Girl" and Rock of the Westies on November 8, 1975 (two weeks)
- Wings – "Silly Love Songs" and Wings at the Speed of Sound on June 18, 1976 (three weeks)
- Barbra Streisand – "Evergreen (Love Theme from A Star Is Born)" and A Star is Born on March 5, 1977 (three weeks)
- Eagles – "Hotel California" and Hotel California on May 7, 1977 (one week)
- Fleetwood Mac – "Dreams" and Rumours on June 18, 1977 (one week)
- Bee Gees – "Stayin' Alive" and Saturday Night Fever on February 4, 1978 (three weeks)
- Bee Gees – "Night Fever" and Saturday Night Fever on March 18, 1978 (eight weeks)
- Frankie Vallie – "Grease" and Grease: The Original Soundtrack from the Motion Picture on August 26, 1978 (two weeks)
- Donna Summer – "MacArthur Park" and Live and More on November 11, 1978 (one week)
- Rod Stewart – "Da Ya Think I'm Sexy?" and Blondes Have More Fun on February 10, 1979 (three weeks)
- Bee Gees – "Tragedy" and Spirits Having Flown on March 24, 1979 (two weeks)
- The Doobie Brothers – "What a Fool Believes" and Minute by Minute on April 14, 1979 (one week)
- Donna Summer – "Hot Stuff" and Bad Girls on June 16, 1979 (one week)
- Donna Summer – "Bad Girls" and Bad Girls on July 14, 1979 (four weeks)
- The Knack – "My Sharona" and Get the Knack on August 25, 1979 (three weeks)
- Eagles – "Heartache Tonight" and The Long Run on November 10, 1979 (one week)

=== 1980s ===
- Billy Joel – "It's Still Rock and Roll to Me" and Glass Houses on July 19, 1980 (one week)
- Queen – "Another One Bites the Dust" and The Game on October 4, 1980 (three weeks)
- Barbra Streisand – "Woman in Love" and Guilty on October 25, 1980 (two weeks)
- Kenny Rogers – "Lady" and Kenny Rogers' Greatest Hits on December 13, 1980 (two weeks)
- John Lennon – "(Just Like) Starting Over" and Double Fantasy on December 27, 1980 (five weeks)
- REO Speedwagon – "Keep on Loving You" and Hi Infidelity on March 21, 1981 (one week)
- Kim Carnes – "Bette Davis Eyes" and Mistaken Identity on June 27, 1981 (four weeks)
- The J. Geils Band – "Centerfold" and Freeze Frame on February 6, 1982 (four weeks)
- Vangelis – "Chariots of Fire" and Chariots of Fire on May 8, 1982 (one week)
- Paul McCartney – "Ebony and Ivory" and Tug of War on May 28, 1982 (three weeks)
- Men at Work – "Down Under" and Business as Usual on January 15, 1983 (three weeks)
- Michael Jackson – "Billie Jean" and Thriller on March 5, 1983 (seven weeks)
- Michael Jackson – "Beat It" and Thriller on April 30, 1983 (three weeks)
- The Police – "Every Breath You Take" and Synchronicity on July 23, 1983 (six weeks)
- Lionel Richie – "All Night Long (All Night)" and Can't Slow Down on December 3, 1983 (one week)
- Michael Jackson – "Say Say Say" and Thriller on December 24, 1984 (four weeks)
- Prince – "When Doves Cry" and Purple Rain on August 4, 1984 (one week)
- Prince and the Revolution – "Let's Go Crazy" and Purple Rain on September 29, 1984 (two weeks)
- Wham! – "Careless Whisper" and Make It Big on March 2, 1985 (one week)
- Phil Collins – "One More Night" and No Jacket Required on March 30, 1985 (two weeks)
- USA for Africa – "We Are the World" and We Are the World on April 27, 1985 (two weeks)
- Phil Collins – "Sussudio" and No Jacket Required on July 6, 1985 (one week)
- Tears for Fears – "Shout" and Songs from the Big Chair on August 3, 1985 (one week)
- Dire Straits – "Money for Nothing" and Brothers in Arms on September 21, 1985 (three weeks)
- Jan Hammer – "Miami Vice Theme" and Miami Vice on November 9, 1985 (one week)
- Mr. Mister – "Kyrie" and Welcome to the Real World on March 1, 1986 (one week)
- Whitney Houston – "The Greatest Love of All" and Whitney Houston on May 17, 1986 (three weeks)
- Madonna – "Papa Don't Preach" and True Blue on August 16, 1986 (two weeks)
- Boston – "Amanda" and Third Stage on November 8, 1986 (two weeks)
- Bon Jovi – "Livin' on a Prayer" and Slippery When Wet on February 14, 1987 (three weeks)
- U2 – "With or Without You" and The Joshua Tree on May 16, 1987 (three weeks)
- Whitney Houston – "I Wanna Dance With Somebody (Who Loves Me)" and Whitney on June 27, 1987 (two weeks)
- Los Lobos – "La Bamba" and La Bamba on September 12, 1987 (one week)
- Michael Jackson – "Bad" and Bad on October 24, 1987 (two weeks)
- Bill Medley and Jennifer Warnes – "(I've Had) The Time of My Life" and Dirty Dancing on November 28, 1987 (one week)
- George Michael – "Father Figure" and Faith on February 27, 1988 (two weeks)
- George Michael – "One More Try" and Faith on May 28, 1988 (two weeks)
- Debbie Gibson – "Lost in Your Eyes" and Electric Youth on March 11, 1989 (two weeks)
- Madonna – "Like a Prayer" and Like a Prayer on April 22, 1989 (three weeks)
- Prince – "Batdance" and Batman on August 5, 1989 (one week)
- New Kids on the Block – "Hangin' Tough" and Hangin' Tough on September 9, 1989 (two weeks)
- Milli Vanilli – "Girl I'm Gonna Miss You" and Girl You Know It's True on September 23, 1989 (two weeks)
- Janet Jackson – "Miss You Much" and Janet Jackson's Rhythm Nation 1814 on October 28, 1989 (one week)
- Milli Vanilli – "Blame It on the Rain" and Girl You Know It's True on November 25, 1989 (two weeks)
- Billy Joel – "We Didn't Start the Fire" and Storm Front on December 16, 1989 (one week)
- Phil Collins – "Another Day in Paradise" and ...But Seriously on December 30, 1989 (two weeks) (Note: Collins' "Another Day and Paradise" and ...But Seriously continued to chart at number-one simultaneously into the 1990s.)

=== 1990s ===
- Paula Abdul – "Opposites Attract" and Forever Your Girl on February 10, 1990 (three weeks)
- Sinéad O'Connor – "Nothing Compares 2 U" and I Do Not Want What I Haven't Got on April 28, 1990 (three weeks)
- New Kids on the Block – "Step by Step" and Step by Step on June 30, 1990 (one week)
- Mariah Carey – "Someday" and Mariah Carey on March 9, 1991 (two weeks)
- Paula Abdul – "Rush Rush" and Spellbound on June 15, 1991 (one week)
- Michael Jackson – "Black or White and Dangerous on December 14, 1991 (four weeks)
- Kris Kross – "Jump" and Totally Krossed Out on May 23, 1992 (one week) and June 6, 1992 (one week)
- Whitney Houston – "I Will Always Love You" and The Bodyguard on December 12, 1992 (twelve weeks)
- Janet Jackson – "That's the Way Love Goes and janet on June 5, 1993 (five weeks)
- Mariah Carey – "Hero" and Music Box on December 25, 1993 (three weeks)
- Ace of Base – "The Sign" and The Sign on April 2, 1994 (one week)
- Boyz II Men – "I'll Make Love to You and II on September 17, 1994 (two weeks), October 8, 1994 (one week), and October 29, 1994 (three weeks)
- Mariah Carey – "Fantasy" and Daydream on October 21, 1995 (three weeks)
- Mariah Carey – "One Sweet Day" and Daydream on December 30, 1995 (three weeks)
- The Notorious B.I.G. – "Hypnotize" and Life After Death on May 3, 1997 (one week)
- Puff Daddy – "I'll Be Missing You" and No Way Out on August 9, 1997 (one week) and August 23, 1997 (one week)
- Puff Daddy – "Mo Money Mo Problems" and No Way Out on August 30, 1997 (one week)
- Celine Dion – "My Heart Will Go On" and Titanic: Music from the Motion Picture on February 28, 1998 (two weeks)
- Britney Spears – "...Baby One More Time" and ...Baby One More Time on January 30, 1999 (one week)
- Ricky Martin – "Livin' la Vida Loca" and Ricky Martin on May 29, 1999 (one week)
- Santana – "Smooth" and Supernatural on October 30, 1999 (three weeks)

=== 2000s ===
- Madonna – "Music" and Music on October 7, 2000 (one week)
- Shaggy – "Angel" and Hot Shot on March 31, 2001 (one week)
- Janet Jackson – "All for You" and All for You on May 12, 2001 (one week)
- Ja Rule – "I'm Real (Murder Remix)" and Pain Is Love on October 20, 2001 (two weeks)
- Jennifer Lopez – "Ain't It Funny (Murder Remix)" and J to tha L–O! The Remixes on March 9, 2002 (one week)
- Ashanti – "Foolish" and Ashanti on April 20, 2002 (three weeks)
- Nelly - "Hot in Herre" and Nellyville on July 13, 2002 (three weeks)
- Nelly – "Dilemma" and Nellyville on August 31, 2002 (one week)
- Eminem – "Lose Yourself" and 8 Mile on November 16, 2002 (two weeks) and January 11, 2003 (two weeks)
- 50 Cent – "In Da Club" and Get Rich or Die Tryin' on March 22, 2003 (three weeks)
- Beyoncé – "Crazy in Love" and Dangerously in Love on July 12, 2003 (one week)
- OutKast – "Hey Ya!" and Speakerboxxx/The Love Below on January 10, 2004 (two weeks) and January 31, 2004 (two weeks)
- Usher – "Yeah!" and Confessions on April 10, 2004 (five weeks)
- Usher – "Burn" and Confessions on May 22, 2004 (three weeks) and June 19, 2004 (one week)
- 50 Cent – "Candy Shop" and The Massacre on March 19, 2005 (six weeks)
- Mariah Carey – "We Belong Together" and The Emancipation of Mimi on June 18, 2005 (one week)
- Kanye West – "Gold Digger" and Late Registration on September 17, 2005 (two weeks)
- Ne-Yo – "So Sick" and In My Own Words on March 18, 2006 (one week)
- Nelly Furtado – "Promiscuous" and Loose on July 8, 2006 (one week)
- Justin Timberlake – "SexyBack" and FutureSex/LoveSounds on September 30, 2006 (two weeks)
- Avril Lavigne – "Girlfriend" and The Best Damn Thing on May 5, 2007 (one week)
- Alicia Keys – "No One" and As I Am on December 1, 2007 (one week)
- Leona Lewis – "Bleeding Love" and Spirit on April 26, 2008 (one week)
- T.I. – "Live Your Life" and Paper Trail on October 18, 2008 (one week)
- The Black Eyed Peas – "Boom Boom Pow" and The E.N.D. on June 27, 2009 (one week)
- The Black Eyed Peas – "I Gotta Feeling" and The E.N.D. on July 11, 2009 (one week)

=== 2010s ===
- Kesha – "Tik Tok" and Animal on January 23, 2010 (one week)
- Eminem – "Love the Way You Lie" and Recovery on July 31, 2010 (two weeks) and August 28, 2010 (two weeks)
- Adele – "Rolling in the Deep" and 21 on May 21, 2011 (3 weeks) and June 25, 2011 (one week)
- Adele – "Someone Like You" and 21 on November 5, 2011 (one week)
- Adele – "Set Fire to the Rain" and 21 on February 4, 2012 (two weeks)
- Rihanna – "Diamonds" and Unapologetic on December 8, 2012 (one week)
- Robin Thicke – "Blurred Lines" and Blurred Lines on August 17, 2013 (one week)
- Taylor Swift – "Shake It Off" and 1989 on November 15, 2014 (two weeks)
- Taylor Swift – "Blank Space" and 1989 on November 29, 2014 (one week), December 13, 2014 (two weeks), and January 3, 2015 (two weeks)
- Wiz Khalifa and Charlie Puth – "See You Again" and Furious 7: Original Motion Picture Soundtrack on April 25, 2015 (one week)
- The Weeknd – "Can't Feel My Face" and Beauty Behind the Madness on September 26, 2015 (one week)
- The Weeknd – "The Hills" and Beauty Behind the Madness on October 3, 2015 (one week)
- Adele – "Hello" and 25 on December 12, 2015 (six weeks)
- Rihanna – "Work" and Anti on April 2, 2016 (one week)
- Drake – "One Dance" and Views on May 21, 2016 (one week) and June 4, 2016 (seven weeks)
- Ed Sheeran – "Shape of You" and ÷ on March 25, 2017 (two weeks)
- Kendrick Lamar – "Humble" and Damn on May 6, 2017 (one week)
- Camila Cabello – "Havana" and Camila on January 27, 2018 (one week)
- Drake – "Nice for What and Scorpion on July 14, 2018 (one week)
- Drake – "In My Feelings" and Scorpion on July 21, 2018 (four weeks)
- Travis Scott – "Sicko Mode" and Astroworld on December 8, 2018 (one week)
- Ariana Grande – "7 Rings" and Thank U, Next on February 23, 2019 (two weeks)
- Lady Gaga and Bradley Cooper – "Shallow" and A Star Is Born on March 9, 2019 (one week)

=== 2020s ===
- Roddy Ricch – "The Box" and Please Excuse Me for Being Antisocial on January 18, 2020 (one week), February 8, 2020 (one week), and February 22, 2020 (one week)
- The Weeknd – "Blinding Lights" and After Hours on April 4, 2020 (two weeks) and April 25, 2020 (one week)
- Taylor Swift – "Cardigan" and Folklore on August 8, 2020 (one week)
- BTS – "Life Goes On" and Be on December 5, 2020 (one week)
- Taylor Swift – "Willow" and Evermore on December 26, 2020 (one week)
- Justin Bieber – "Peaches" and Justice on April 3, 2021 (one week)
- Drake – "Way 2 Sexy" and Certified Lover Boy on September 18, 2021 (one week)
- Taylor Swift – "All Too Well (Taylor's Version)" and Red (Taylor's Version) on November 27, 2021 (one week)
- Adele – "Easy on Me" and 30 on December 4, 2021 (three weeks)
- Carolina Gaitán, Mauro Castillo, Adassa, Rhenzy Feliz,
  Diane Guerrero, Stephanie Beatriz and the Encanto cast – "We Don't Talk About Bruno" and Encanto (Original Motion Picture Soundtrack) on February 5, 2022 (five weeks)
- Future – "Wait for U" and I Never Liked You on May 14, 2022 (one week)
- Harry Styles – "As It Was" and Harry's House on June 4, 2022 (two weeks)
- Drake – "Jimmy Cooks" and Honestly, Nevermind on July 2, 2022 (one week)
- Beyoncé – "Break My Soul" and Renaissance on August 13, 2022 (one week)
- Taylor Swift – "Anti-Hero" and Midnights on November 5, 2022 (two weeks) and November 26, 2022 (three weeks)
- Morgan Wallen – "Last Night" and One Thing at a Time on March 18, 2023 (one week), April 15, 2023 (two weeks), May 6, 2023 (five weeks), and June 24, 2023 (three weeks)
- Olivia Rodrigo – "Vampire" and Guts on September 23, 2023 (one week)
- Drake – "First Person Shooter" and For All the Dogs on October 21, 2023 (one week)
- Taylor Swift – "Is It Over Now?" and 1989 (Taylor's Version) on November 11, 2023 (one week)
- Taylor Swift – "Cruel Summer" and 1989 (Taylor's Version) on November 18, 2023 (one week)
- Ariana Grande - "We Can't Be Friends (Wait For Your Love)" and Eternal Sunshine on March 23, 2024 (one week)
- Future and Metro Boomin - "Like That featuring Kendrick Lamar" and We Don't Trust You on April 6, 2024 (one week)
- Taylor Swift – "Fortnight featuring Post Malone" and The Tortured Poets Department on May 4, 2024 (two weeks)
- Kendrick Lamar - "Squabble Up" and GNX on December 7, 2024 (one week)
- Kendrick Lamar - "Not Like Us" and GNX on February 22, 2025 (one week)
- Kendrick Lamar - "Luther with SZA" and GNX on March 15, 2025 (one week)
- SZA - "Luther with Kendrick Lamar" and SOS on May 3, 2025 (one week)
- Morgan Wallen - "What I Want featuring Tate McRae" and I'm the Problem on May 31, 2025 (one week)
- Taylor Swift - "The Fate of Ophelia" and The Life of a Showgirl on October 18, 2025 (seven weeks)
- Bruno Mars - "I Just Might" and The Romantic on March 14, 2026 (one week)
- BTS - "Swim" and Arirang on April 4, 2026 (one week)
- Ella Langley - "Choosin' Texas" and Dandelion on April 25, 2026 (one week)
- Drake - "Janice STFU" and Iceman on May 30, 2026 (two weeks)

=== Notes ===
a – These albums charted at number-one on the mono albums Billboard chart.

== List Inclusions ==
- Original singles with associated soundtracks featuring various artists who top their collective charts are included here.
- All artists who are officially namechecked in song credits are listed here; this includes one-time pairings of otherwise solo artists and those appearing as "featuring".
- Double A-sides are counted as one number-one single.
- Paul McCartney's hits with Wings are credited to "Wings" even though many of them were released as "Paul McCartney & Wings".
- "We Are the World" is credited to "USA for Africa", and not the individual artists who participated in the recording.
- Artists who hit number one prior to the start of the Hot 100 and Billboard 200 are included here.
- A song that topped multiple pre-Hot 100 charts is counted only once.

== See also ==
- List of artists who have achieved simultaneous number-one UK Single and Album
- List of artists who reached number one in the United States
- List of Billboard 200 number-one albums
- List of Billboard number-one singles
