= Sailor (song) =

1959 song

Single by Anne Shelton
- B-side: "Souvenir of Ireland"
- Released: January 1961
- Recorded: December 1960
- Studio: Philips (London, UK)
- Genre: Traditional pop, schlager
- Length: 2:45
- Label: Philips
- Songwriters: Werner Scharfenberger, Fini Busch (original German lyrics), David West (English lyrics)
- Producer: Johnny Franz

Anne Shelton singles chronology
"Come Back Again" (1960)	"Sailor" (1961)	"I Will Light a Candle" (1961)

"Sailor"

Single by Petula Clark
- B-side: "My Heart (Amor)"
- Released: January 1961
- Recorded: Pye Studios (Marble Arch) December 1960
- Genre: Traditional pop, schlager
- Length: 2:57
- Label: Pye
- Songwriters: Werner Scharfenberger, Fini Busch (original German lyrics), David West (English lyrics)
- Producer: Alan A. Freeman

Petula Clark UK singles chronology
"Cinderella Jones" (1960)	"Sailor" (1961)	"Something Missing" (1961)

"Sailor"

Single by Petula Clark 1968 re-release (South Africa)
- B-side: "My Friend the Sea"
- Released: August 1968
- Recorded: Pye Studios (Marble Arch) December 1960
- Genre: Traditional pop
- Length: 2:57
- Label: Vogue
- Songwriters: Werner Scharfenberger, Fini Busch (original German lyrics), David West (English lyrics)
- Producer: Alan A. Freeman

Petula Clark South African singles chronology
"The Other Man's Grass (Is Always Greener)" (1968)	"Sailor" (1968)	"I Want to Sing In Your Band" (1968)

"Marin"

Single by Petula Clark

from the album Tête À Tête Avec Petula Clark
- B-side: "My Heart (Amor)"
- Released: April 1961
- Genre: Traditional pop
- Length: 2:57
- Label: Vogue
- Songwriters: Werner Scharfenberger, Fini Busch (original German lyrics), David West (English lyrics), Jean Broussolle (French lyrics)
- Producer: Alan A. Freeman

Petula Clark French singles chronology
"Sur Un Tapis Volant" (1961)	"Marin" (1961)	"Calcutta (Ma Fete A Moi)" (1961)

"Sailor" is the title of the English-language rendering of the 1959 schlager composition "Seemann (Deine Heimat ist das Meer)" originally written in German by Werner Scharfenberger (de) and lyricist Fini Busch (de): featuring lyrics in English by Norman Newell (writing as David West), "Sailor" would in 1961 afford Petula Clark her first UK number 1 hit, simultaneously granting Top Ten success to Anne Shelton while also bringing her chart career to a close. Clark was also afforded international success with both her recording of "Sailor" and "Marin", the French-language rendering of the song.

== Original German-language version ==
see Seemann (Lolita song) § Original German-language version

== English-language version ==
=== Composition ===
Lyricist Norman Newell would later recall that his publisher phoned him on a Friday requesting he write English lyrics for Lolita's hit "Sailor (Your Home is the Sea)": although Newell agreed to prepare the lyrics over the weekend, the assignment slipped his mind until a messenger arrived on Monday morning to pick up Newell's work. (Norman Newell quote:) "I sent [the messenger] to the canteen and wrote the lyric [for] 'Sailor' in ten minutes. I wondered it if was good enough, but it was a tremendous hit for both Petula Clark and Anne Shelton". While the original German lyrics of the song had addressed a seafaring love object with an acceptance of his wanderlust the lyrics written by Newell (as David West) inverted this sentiment turning the song into a plea for the sailor to return.

=== Anne Shelton ===
The first recording of the English version of "Sailor" was made by Anne Shelton, with her session arranged and conducted by Wally Stott, featuring guitarist Big Jim Sullivan, who would also play on the version by Petula Clark.

Shelton had spent four weeks at number 1 UK with "Lay Down Your Arms" in 1956, but had since only had one further charting record, "The Village of St. Bernadette" number 27 in 1959, when her version of "Sailor" reached number 10 in January 1961. Although she had been recording solo since 1943, "Sailor" was only her fifth UK chart appearance, as her most intense period of popularity had predated the UK singles chart, and "Sailor" would mark Shelton's final chart appearance.

Shelton's strongest association was as an entertainer of the forces in World War II; while this made "Sailor" a good thematic choice for her, this association also perhaps made her seem outmoded, despite only being nine years senior to Petula Clark, whose version of "Sailor" would best Shelton's. Although Shelton's and Clark's versions of "Sailor" both debuted on the UK Top 50 for 28 January 1961, there was immediate preference apparent for Clark's version at number 18 over Shelton's at number 27. The 4 February chart had Clark rise to number 4 for the first of six weeks in the Top Five three of them at number 2 and one at number 1, while Shelton's version in its second week rose to number 19 and in its third week to number 10 which proved to be its peak as it subsequently descended the charts over the next five weeks for a total eight-week chart span: Clark's version had almost double the chart span at fifteen weeks.

=== Petula Clark ===
Petula Clark recorded "Sailor" with her regular producer Alan A. Freeman who was assisted with the track's production by Tony Hatch, marking the first collaboration between Clark and her future hit making mentor. Clark, based in Paris since 1957, had been pitched "Sailor" by Hatch and orchestra leader Peter Knight while in London for a conference: (Petula Clark quote:)"I said yes, yes, yes. It's a nice sounding song [that] I liked". In addition to the Peter Knight Orchestra and Chorus, the session personnel for Clark's recording of "Sailor" included guitarists Vic Flick and Big Jim Sullivan, and also Harry Pitch whose harmonica playing was a striking feature of the track.

Originally scheduled for 20 January 1961, the release of Clark's version of "Sailor" was moved up a week to 13 January due to Anne Shelton's version of the song being released within the first two weeks of the year. Clark's version of "Sailor" debuted at number 18 on the UK Top 50 dated 28 January 1961, becoming Clark's first UK chart entry since "Baby Lover", number 12 in March 1958, an intermittent ten UK single releases having failed to chart. A sales total of 250,000 units for Clark's "Sailor" was announced by Pye Records the week of 18 February 1961 when the single was in its second week at number 2: on the chart for the following week: that of 23 February 1961, Clark's "Sailor" moved to the number 1 position of the UK chart, besting Clark's previous strongest UK charter: With All My Heart" which in 1957 had peaked at number 4. On the tally of the biggest UK hits of 1961 "Sailor" by Petula Clark is ranked at number 16.

Although "Downtown" was to become Clark's signature song its UK chart peak would be number 2: the second Petula Clark single to reach number 1 in the UK Singles Chart would be "This is My Song" in 1967. Both of Clark's UK number 1 hits would compete with rival versions: "Sailor" would be a number 10 hit for Anne Shelton while Harry Secombe's version of "This is My Song" would rise as high as number 2. (The relevant recordings by both Shelton and Secombe have Wally Stott perform arranging and conducting duties.)

Clark's "Sailor" became the third hit version of the song in the Low Countries, reaching number 13 in the Netherlands and - in a tandem ranking with "Seemann (Deine Heimat ist das Meer)" by Lolita - number 12 on the chart for the Flemish Region of Belgium, where the Dutch-language rendering "Zeeman" had already been a Top Ten hit for Caterina Valente. Number 1 in New Zealand and Israel in, respectively, March and September 1961, "Sailor" also afforded Clark a hit in Denmark (number 9) and Spain (Top 20). In South Africa, "Sailor" would twice become a Top Ten hit for Clark, first reaching number 2 in its original 1961 release and subsequently afforded a number 9 chart peak via a local re-release in the summer of 1968.

=== Other cover versions ===
Besides the versions by Anne Shelton and Petula Clark detailed above, two other acts had UK single releases of "Sailor" in January 1961: veteran American vocal trio the Andrews Sisters and also American stage musical actress Eileen Rodgers, the latter version being entitled "Sailor (Your Home Is In sic The Sea)". The Andrews Sisters, who were in London for an engagement at the Talk of the Town, made a one-off single for Decca Records (UK) comprising "Sailor" backed by "Goodnight and Sweet Dreaming"; the tracks, which featured Bernard Ebbinghouse (de) conducting his orchestra, were recorded on 29 December 1960. The version of "Sailor" by Eileen Rodgers - which featured the Stan Applebaum Orchestra - had been recorded in New York City for Kapp Records the label who had issued the US hit version "Sailor (Your Home Is On The Sea)" which featured the original German-language vocal by Lolita: unreleased in the US, Rodgers' version was afforded release by Kapp's UK licensee London Records only to be shortly afterwards withdrawn.

In 1974, actor Peter Gilmore, then renowned for his sea-captain role in the BBC-TV series The Onedin Line, recorded the album James Onedin Songs of the Sea from which his rendition of "Sailor" - entitled "Sailor (Seemann)" - was issued as a single (the album was recorded and released in the Netherlands).

Louise Morrissey recorded "Sailor" for her 2008 album release The Gift.

An instrumental version of "Sailor (Your Home Is The Sea)" appears on the 1961 album Songs Of The Soaring '60s Volume 1 by Roger Williams: the track later served as B-side for Williams' 1965 single release "Summer Wind".

== Marin: French-language version ==
When Petula Clark charted in her native UK with the English-language rendering of "Sailor" reaching #1 in February 1961 she ended a UK chart absence of almost three years. However, during those same three years Clark did enjoy a string of hit singles in France and she expediently rendered her UK hit "Sailor" with French-language lyrics - by Jean Broussolle (fr) - with the resultant track "Marin" becoming Clark's eighth French chart hit, its #2 peak - reached in May 1961 - matching Clark's previous best French charting that being with "Java Pour Petula" #2 in 1959. (Clark's English-language recording of "Sailor" had been issued in France in February 1961 failing to chart.) Clark's next French chart hit after "Marin": "Roméo" (also a French rendering a UK hit by Clark), would be the first of Clark's five French #1's.

"Marin" reached #10 on the charts for the French-speaking sector of Belgium and the single also entered the Montreal charts (as "Sailor") in January 1961 peaking at #13 marking Clark's first appearance on an accredited North American chart almost four years before her breakout hit "Downtown". A cover version of "Marin" - so entitled - was recorded by Québécois singer Pierrette Roy and was ranked at #22 on the annual tally of Québécois hits for 1961.

"Marin" has also been recorded by Charles Level (fr), Florence Passy (fr), John William (fr), Antoni Williams, and by Alain Morisod & Sweet People for their 2009 album which is entitled Marin.

== Versions in other languages ==
see Seemann (Lolita song).
