= Seemann =

Seemann is the German word for sailor. It may refer to:

- Seemann (surname)
- "Seemann" (Lolita song), released 1960 by Austrian singer Lolita
- "Seemann" (Rammstein song), a 1996 single by the German band Rammstein

== See also ==
- Seeman (disambiguation)
- Zeeman (disambiguation)
