= P. seemannii =

P. seemannii may refer to a few different species of plant. The specific epithet seemannii refers to someone with the surname 'Seemann,' in many cases it's botanist Berthold Carl Seemann (1825–1871).

- Palicourea seemannii, a plant in the family Rubiaceae
- Parosela seemannii, a plant in the family Fabaceae
- Passiflora seemannii, a plant in the family Passifloraceae
- Pectis seemannii, a plant in the family Asteraceae
- Pellaea seemannii, a fern in the family Pteridaceae
- Perezia seemannii, a plant in the family Asteraceae
- Phegopteris seemannii, a fern in the family Thelypteridaceae
- Phyllanthus seemannii, a plant in the genus Phyllanthus native to Fiji
- Phytelephas seemannii, a plant in the family Arecaceae
- Pilea seemannii, a plant in the family Urticaceae
- Polypodium seemannii, a fern in the family Polypodiaceae
- Porophyllum seemannii, a plant in the family Asteraceae
- Pothos seemannii, a plant in the family Araceae
- Prestonia seemannii, a plant in the family Apocynaceae
- Ptychosperma seemannii, a synonym for Balaka seemannii, a palm in the family Arecaceae
