= Zeeman =

Zeeman may refer to:

- "Zeeman (Je Verlangen Is De Zee)", Dutch rendering of the 1960-61 German-language hit single ""Seemann (Deine Heimat ist das Meer)"
- Zeeman (crater), a lunar impact crater located on the far side of the Moon near its south pole
- Zeeman effect, the splitting of a spectral line into several components in the presence of a static magnetic field
- Zeeman (store), a European clothing chain based in the Netherlands
- Zeeman slower, a scientific apparatus that is commonly used in quantum optics to cool a beam of atoms from room temperature or above to a few kelvins
- Zeeman (surname)
- SS Zeeman (1943) a Dutch Liberty ship in service 1946-50

== See also ==
- Seeman (disambiguation)
- Seemann (disambiguation)
