= Seaman =

Seaman may refer to:

- Able seaman, a Sailor with more than two years' experience
- Sailor, a member of a marine watercraft's crew
- Seaman (rank), a military rank in some navies
- Seaman (name) (including a list of people with the name)
- Seaman (video game), a 1999 simulation video game for the Sega Dreamcast
- Seaman (dog), on the Lewis and Clark Expedition
- USS Seaman (DD-791), a destroyer
- Seaman, Ohio, a village in the United States
- Seaman, a character from South Park

== See also ==
- Seaman Range, a mountain range in Nevada, United States
- Seaman Reservoir, northwest of Fort Collins, Colorado, United States
- Seaman High School, Kansas
- Seaman's Furniture, an American chain of furniture stores
- Seaman's Hospital, Hong Kong, closed in 1873
- Seaman Stadium, a sports venue in Okotoks, Alberta, Canada
- Seaman Farm, Dix Hills, New York, on the National Register of Historic Places
- Seamans (disambiguation)
- Seeman (surname), list of people with the surname
- Semen
