= Lolita (Austrian singer) =

Austrian singer (1931–2010)

- Also known as: Ditta Zusa Einzinger
- Born: Edith Zuser; 17 January 1931; St Pölten, Austria
- Died: 1 July 2010 (aged 79) Salzburg, Austria
- Genres: Schlager, folk
- Occupation: Singer
- Years active: 1950s–2005
- Label: Polydor

Edith "Ditta" Einzinger (born Edith Zuser; 17 January 1931 – 1 July 2010) was an Austrian pop singer who recorded under the stage name Lolita.

She began singing in local clubs while working as a kindergarten teacher. Discovered in 1956, she began her recording career in 1957. Early recordings typically were songs with a Latin American, South Sea Island, or similar exotic theme. In December 1959, she recorded what would become her only gold record, "Seemann, deine Heimat ist das Meer" ("Sailor, Your Home is the Sea"), which was a hit single in the United States, peaking at number five, number one for two weeks in Canada, and in Japan as well as in German-speaking Europe in 1960. It was one of a handful of records sung in a language other than English to have been successful in the mainstream American market.

Translated as "Sailor", the song was later covered by Petula Clark and Anne Shelton, both of whom had hits with it in the UK Singles Chart, as well as the Andrews Sisters. Clark also took the song to No. 1 in France in 1961, under the title "Marin (Enfant du voyage)".

Lolita continued recording maritime and South Seas titles and in later years, her recordings were more typically Austrian and German folk songs, including yodels.

== Death ==
Before her death in Salzburg, aged 79, from cancer, Lolita lived in Großgmain. Twice divorced, she was survived by two children.
