= Calcutta! =

Studio album by Lawrence Welk and His Orchestra
- Released: 1961
- Genre: Easy listening
- Label: Dot

Calcutta! is an album by Lawrence Welk and His Orchestra. It was released in 1961 on the Dot label (catalog no. DLP-3359). The album featured Frank Scott at the harpsichord and included Welk's No. 1 hit single, "Calcutta".

The album debuted on Billboard magazine's popular albums chart on January 30, 1961, held the No. 1 spot for 11 weeks, and remained on that chart for 50 weeks. It was certified as a gold record by the RIAA.

Reviewer Mike Stevens in 1961 wrote that the album marked a departure from the "champagne music" of his past and his entry into "the kingdom of rock and roll." With this "unexpected move", Stevens wrote that "it is necessary to discuss Welk seriously (for the first time)."

AllMusic later gave the album a rating of four stars. Reviewer Greg Adams praised its "brisk rhythms, hand claps, wordless chorus, and prominent melody" as "an infectious instrumental."

== Track listing ==
Side 1

1. "Calcutta" (Heino Gaze) [2:12]
2. "Sailor (Your Home Is the Sea)" (Busch, Holt, Scharfenberger) [2:13]
3. "Perfidia" (Leeds, Dominguez) [2:00]
4. "April in Portugal" (Ferrao, Galhardo, Larue) [2:05]
5. "Humoresque Boogie" (Welk, Cates) [2:08]
6. "Corrine Corrina" (Williams, Chatman Parish) [2:17]

Side 2

1. "Bombay" [2:08]
2. "Mam'selle" [1:55]
3. "Mountain King" [2:32]
4. "Blue Tango" [2:10]
5. "Ruby" [2:30]
6. "Save the Last Dance for Me" [2:33]
