= List of Hot R&B Sides number ones of 1961 =

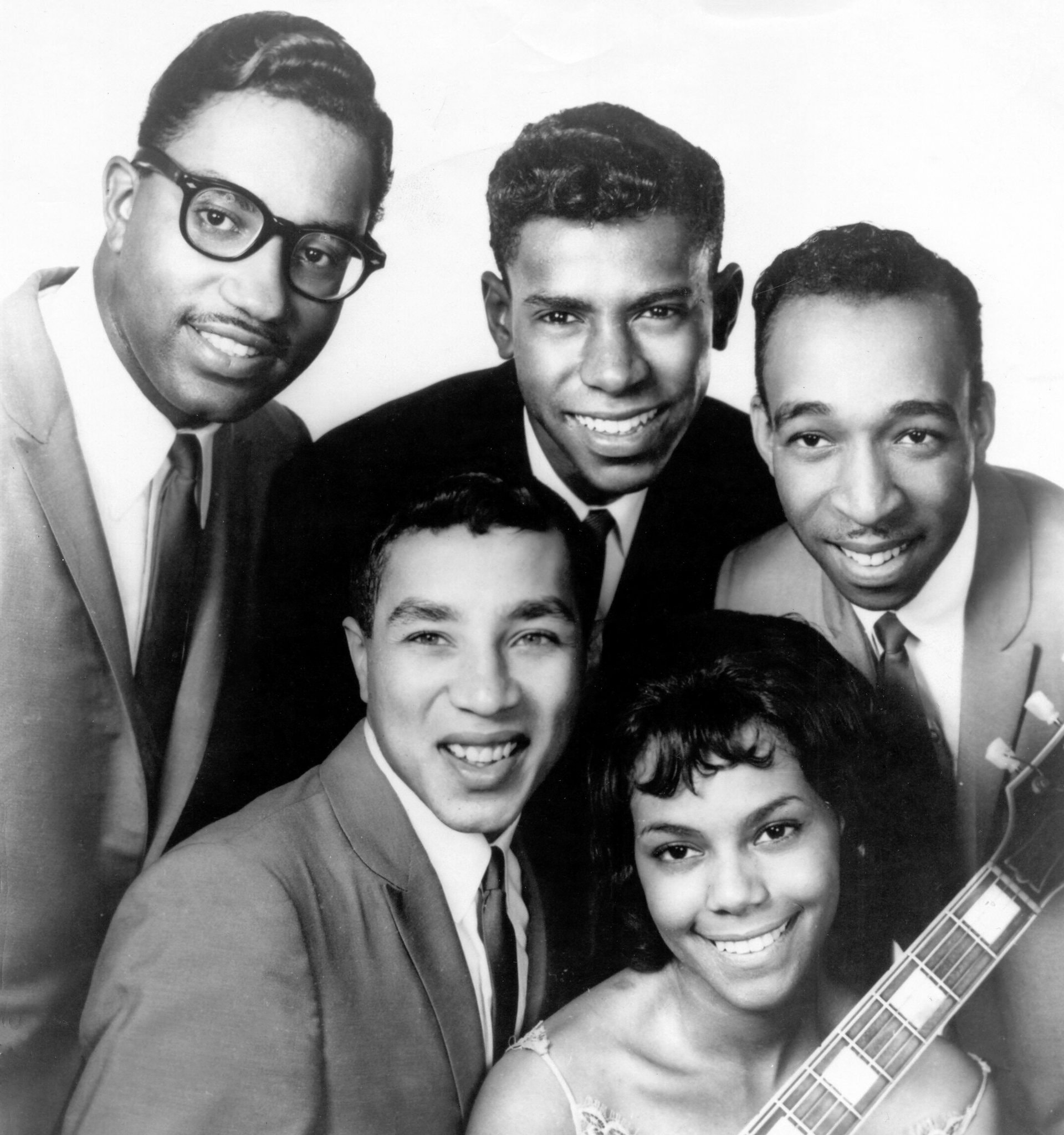
The Miracles spent eight weeks at number one with "Shop Around".

In 1961, Billboard published the Hot R&B Sides chart ranking the top-performing songs in the United States in rhythm and blues (R&B) and related African American-oriented music genres; the chart has undergone various name changes over the decades to reflect the evolution of such genres and since 2005 has been published as Hot R&B/Hip-Hop Songs. During 1961, 14 different singles topped the chart, based on playlists submitted by radio stations and surveys of retail sales outlets.

In the issue of Billboard dated January 2, Jerry Butler was at number one with "He Will Break Your Heart", the song's seventh week in the top spot. Two weeks later, it was displaced by "Shop Around" by the Miracles featuring Bill "Smokey" Robinson. "Shop Around" was the first million-selling single for the fledgling Motown label, which would go on to become one of the most successful and influential labels of the 20th century and bring unprecedented levels of mainstream success to black music. Motown achieved another number one when the Marvelettes topped the chart in November with "Please Mr. Postman", which held the top spot for the final seven weeks of the year. This song was the first Motown release to also top the all-genre Hot 100 singles chart.

The only act to achieve more than one R&B number one in 1961 was Ray Charles, who topped the chart for a single week in April with "One Mint Julep" and for five weeks beginning in October with "Hit the Road Jack". The year's longest-running number one was "Tossin' and Turnin'" by Bobby Lewis, which spent ten consecutive weeks atop the chart between July and September. Almost every act to top the chart in 1961 did so for the first time. Other than Jerry Butler, whose run atop the chart continued from the previous year, only Bobby "Blue" Bland and Ray Charles had achieved an R&B number one before 1961; Bland had topped the R&B Jockeys chart in 1957, prior to the launch of Billboard's combined sales and airplay listing, and Charles had achieved several chart-toppers both before and after the magazine amalgamated its multiple R&B charts in late 1958. While acts such as Lewis and Ernie K-Doe would experience only brief chart success and never achieve a second number one, the Pips, who would soon give separate billing to lead vocalist Gladys Knight, would remain consistently successful for nearly 30 years.

== Chart history ==
Key
†	Indicates best-charting R&B single of 1961

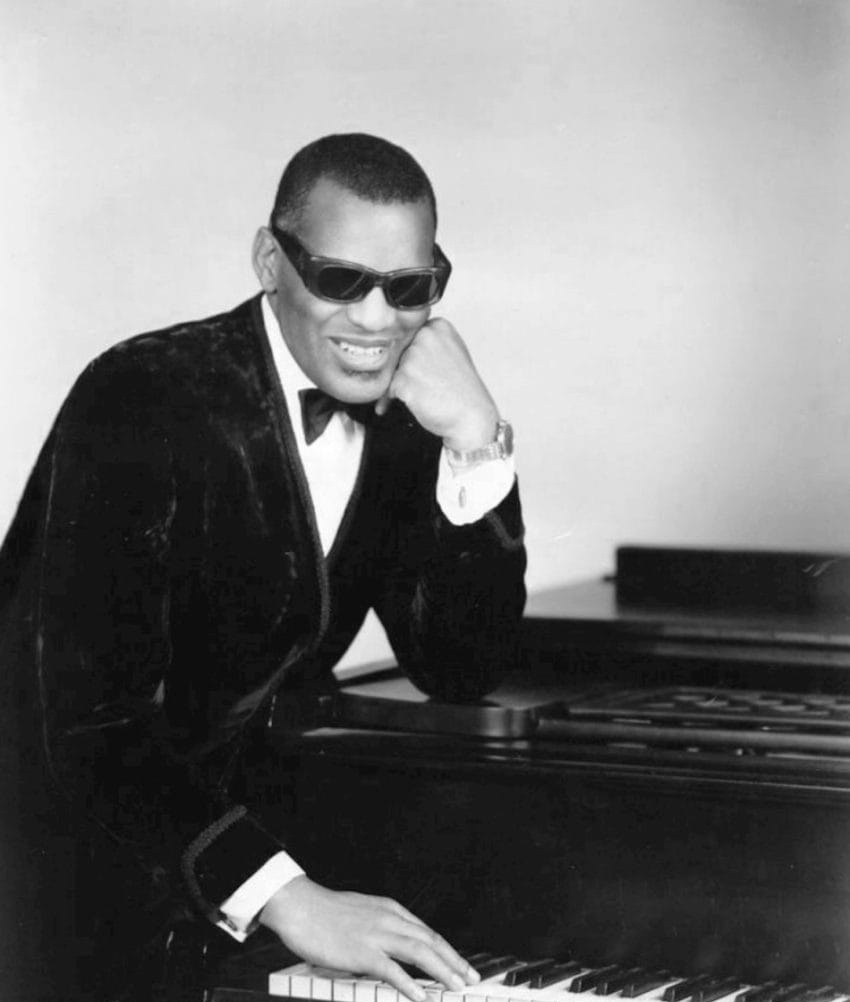
Ray Charles had two number ones in 1961.

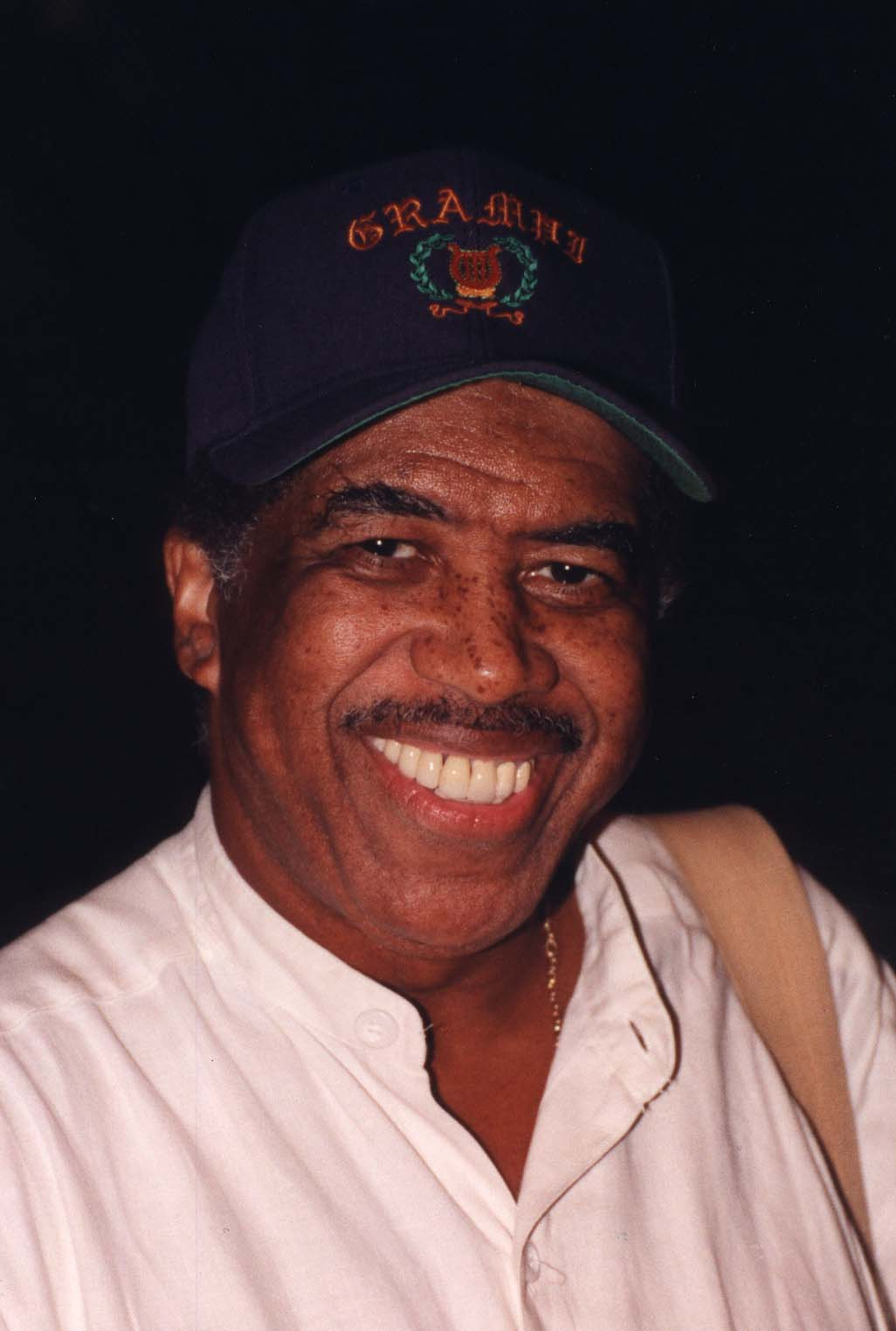
Ben E. King (pictured in later life) topped the chart with "Stand By Me".

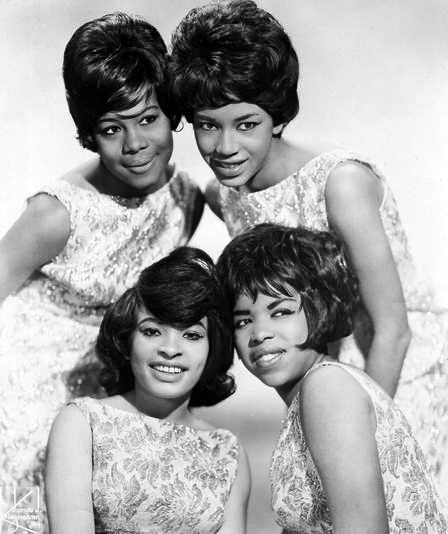
The Marvelettes ended the year at number one.

Chart history
Issue date	Title	Artist(s)	Ref.
January 2	"He Will Break Your Heart"	Jerry Butler	
January 9	"He Will Break Your Heart"	Jerry Butler	
January 16	"Shop Around"	The Miracles featuring Bill "Smokey" Robinson	
January 23	"Shop Around"	The Miracles featuring Bill "Smokey" Robinson	
January 30	"Shop Around"	The Miracles featuring Bill "Smokey" Robinson	
February 6	"Shop Around"	The Miracles featuring Bill "Smokey" Robinson	
February 13	"Shop Around"	The Miracles featuring Bill "Smokey" Robinson	
February 20	"Shop Around"	The Miracles featuring Bill "Smokey" Robinson	
February 27	"Shop Around"	The Miracles featuring Bill "Smokey" Robinson	
March 6	"Shop Around"	The Miracles featuring Bill "Smokey" Robinson	
March 13	"Pony Time"	Chubby Checker	
March 20	"Pony Time"	Chubby Checker	
March 27	"I Pity the Fool"	Bobby "Blue" Bland	
April 3	"Blue Moon"	The Marcels	
April 10	"Blue Moon"	The Marcels	
April 17	"One Mint Julep"	Ray Charles	
April 24	"Mother-in-Law"	Ernie K-Doe	
May 1	"Mother-in-Law"	Ernie K-Doe	
May 8	"Mother-in-Law"	Ernie K-Doe	
May 15	"Mother-in-Law"	Ernie K-Doe	
May 22	"Mother-in-Law"	Ernie K-Doe	
May 29	"Stand By Me"	Ben E. King	
June 5	"Stand By Me"	Ben E. King	
June 12	"Stand By Me"	Ben E. King	
June 19	"Stand By Me"	Ben E. King	
June 26	"Every Beat of My Heart"	The Pips	
July 3	"Tossin' and Turnin'" †	Bobby Lewis	
July 10	"Tossin' and Turnin'" †	Bobby Lewis	
July 17	"Tossin' and Turnin'" †	Bobby Lewis	
July 24	"Tossin' and Turnin'" †	Bobby Lewis	
July 31	"Tossin' and Turnin'" †	Bobby Lewis	
August 7	"Tossin' and Turnin'" †	Bobby Lewis	
August 14	"Tossin' and Turnin'" †	Bobby Lewis	
August 21	"Tossin' and Turnin'" †	Bobby Lewis	
August 28	"Tossin' and Turnin'" †	Bobby Lewis	
September 4	"Tossin' and Turnin'" †	Bobby Lewis	
September 11	"My True Story"	The Jive Five	
September 18	"My True Story"	The Jive Five	
September 25	"My True Story"	The Jive Five	
October 2	"Hit the Road Jack"	Ray Charles and his orchestra	
October 9	"Hit the Road Jack"	Ray Charles and his orchestra	
October 16	"Hit the Road Jack"	Ray Charles and his orchestra	
October 23	"Hit the Road Jack"	Ray Charles and his orchestra	
October 30	"Hit the Road Jack"	Ray Charles and his orchestra	
November 6	"Ya Ya"	Lee Dorsey	
November 13	"Please Mr. Postman"	The Marvelettes	
November 20	"Please Mr. Postman"	The Marvelettes	
November 27	"Please Mr. Postman"	The Marvelettes	
December 4	"Please Mr. Postman"	The Marvelettes	
December 11	"Please Mr. Postman"	The Marvelettes	
December 18	"Please Mr. Postman"	The Marvelettes	
December 25	"Please Mr. Postman"	The Marvelettes	
