= Carnival! (original Broadway cast recording) =

Cast recording by original Broadway cast
- Released: 1961
- Genre: Show tunes
- Label: MGM

An MGM Records original Broadway cast recording of the musical Carnival! was released on LP in 1961 and reached No. 1 on the Billboard Monaural LPs chart.

== Recording ==
The recording was done on Broadway in April 1961. The cast included Anna Maria Alberghetti as the main heroine, Jerry Orbach, James Mitchell, Kaye Ballard, and Pierre Olaf.

== Release ==
The album was originally issued on LP (cat. no. E-3946-OC).

== Reception ==
Professional ratings
Review scores
Source	Rating
AllMusic	4.5/5 stars

The album reached No. 1 on the Billboard's Monaural LPs chart.

In a retrospective review for AllMusic, William Ruhlmann rated the album 4.5 stars.

== Track listing ==
12-inch LP (MGM E-3946-OC)

No.	Title	Artist(s)	Length
1.	"Opening" – "Direct from Vienna"	Kaye Ballard, Henry Lascoe and carnival people	3:35
2.	"Mira (Can You Imagine That?)"	Anna Maria Alberghetti	2:58
3.	"The Sword, the Rose, and the Cape"	James Mitchell and roustabouts	2:12
4.	"Very Nice Man"	Anna Maria Alberghetti	2:00
5.	"I've Got to Find a Reason"	Jerry Orbach	1:38
6.	"Yes, My Heart"	Anna Maria Alberghetti and roustabouts	2:50
7.	"Humming"	Kaye Ballard, Henry Lascoe	3:55
8.	"Theme from Carnival" ("Love Makes the World Go Round")"	Anna Maria Alberghetti	1:47

No.	Title	Artist(s)	Length
1.	"Grand Imperial Cirque de Paris"	Pierre Olaf and carnival people	2:20
2.	"Her Face"	Jerry Orbach	2:08
3.	"Yum, Ticky, Ticky, Tum, Tum" – "The Rich"	Anna Maria Alberghetti and puppets	3:01
4.	"Beautiful Candy"	Anna Maria Alberghetti, puppets and carnival people	2:32
5.	"Ev'rybody Likes You"	Jerry Orbach	2:13
6.	"I Hate Him" / "Her Face" (Reprise)	Anna Maria Alberghetti; Jerry Orbach	2:47
7.	"It Was Always You" / "It Was Always You" (Reprise)	James Mitchell and Kaye Ballard; Kaye Ballard	3:15
8.	"She's My Love"	Jerry Orbach	2:30
9.	"Theme from Carnival" (Finale)	Orchestra and puppet	0:58

== Charts ==
Chart (1961)	Peak position
US Billboard Top LPs / Monaural LPs	1

== Awards ==
Year	Award type	Categories	Results	Ref.
1962	Grammy Awards	Best Original Cast Show Album	Nominated	

== See also ==
- List of Billboard number-one albums of 1961
