= List of Billboard Hot 100 number ones of 1961 =

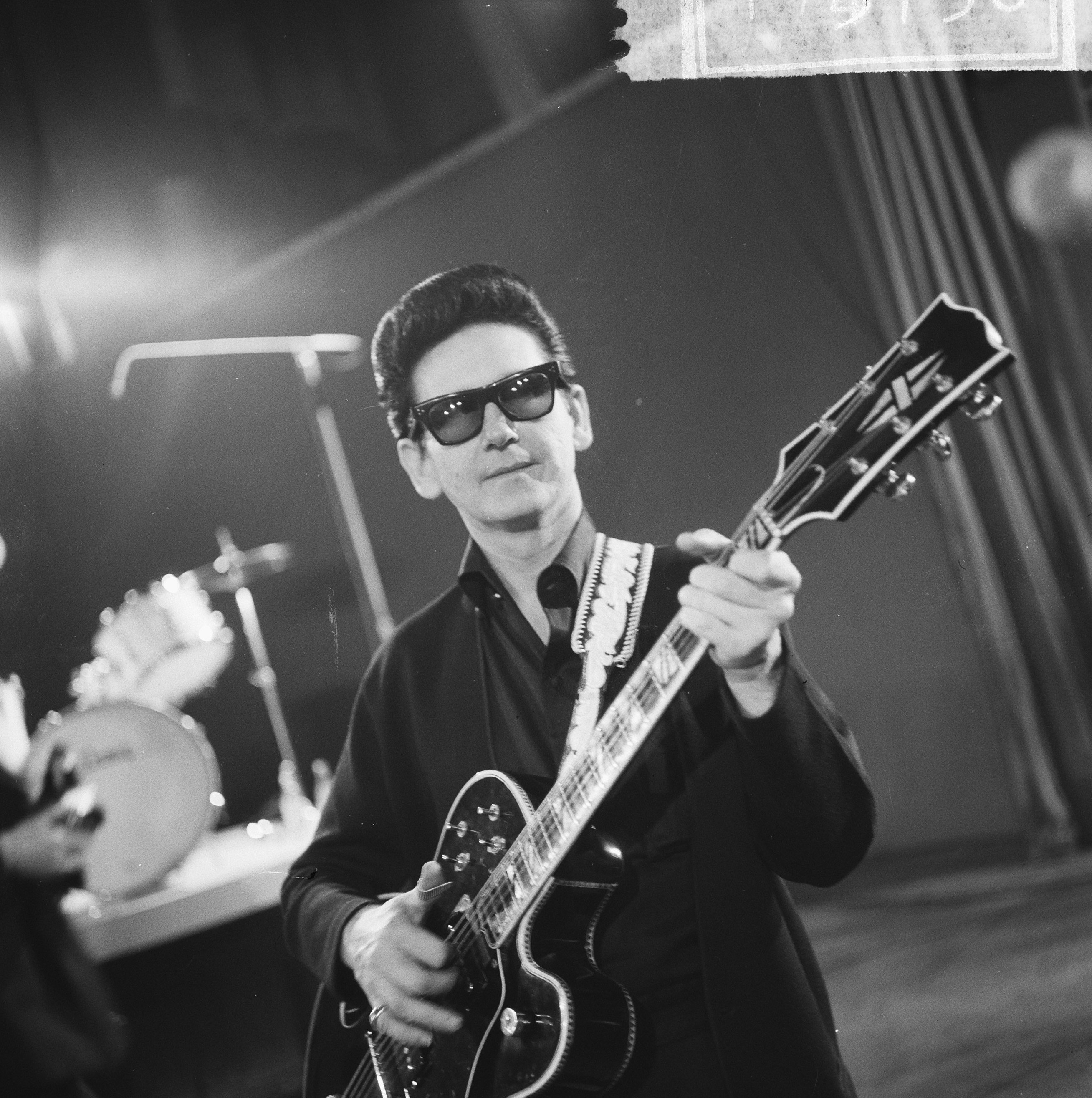
Roy Orbison achieved his first number one in 1961.

The Billboard Hot 100 is a chart published since August 1958 by Billboard magazine which ranks the best-performing singles in the United States. In 1961, it was compiled based on a combination of sales and airplay data sourced from surveys of retail outlets and playlists submitted by radio stations respectively. During the year, 22 different singles spent time at number one.

In the issue of Billboard dated January 2, Elvis Presley was at number one with "Are You Lonesome Tonight?", the song's sixth week in the top spot. Presley returned to number one in March with "Surrender" and was the only act with two chart-toppers in 1961. "Are You Lonesome Tonight?" was displaced from the top of the chart by "Wonderland by Night" by Bert Kaempfert, the first Hot 100 entry for the German bandleader and his only number one. Another bandleader, Lawrence Welk, who at the time starred in his own variety show on the ABC television network, gained his only Hot 100 chart-topper with "Calcutta" in February. Between the two bandleaders' chart-toppers, the Shirelles topped the Hot 100 for the first time with "Will You Love Me Tomorrow". It was the first Hot 100 number one by a girl group. In April and May, the Marcels, Del Shannon, and Ernie K-Doe all topped the listing for their first and only time with "Blue Moon", "Runaway", and "Mother-in-Law" respectively. "Running Scared" gave Roy Orbison his first Hot 100 number one in June; in 1987, the influential singer known for his melodramatic style was among the earliest inductees to the Rock and Roll Hall of Fame.

In June, Pat Boone spent his only week at number one on the Hot 100, when "Moody River" topped the chart, although between 1955 and 1957 he had taken five songs to number one on the separate sales, airplay, and jukebox play charts, which Billboard had published prior to the creation of the consolidated listing. "Moody River" was replaced in the top spot by "Quarter to Three" by U.S. Bonds. The singer, whose real name is Gary Anderson, reportedly had his stage name chosen without his knowledge; soon after "Quarter to Three" topped the Hot 100, his first name was appended and he had further success as Gary U.S. Bonds. The year's longest-running number one was "Tossin' and Turnin'" by Bobby Lewis, which spent seven weeks in the top spot in July and August. It was Lewis's first single to enter the Hot 100; despite the success he achieved with "Tossin' and Turnin'", his chart career was short-lived and his final Hot 100 entry came the following year. Between August and October, Joe Dowell, The Highwaymen, Bobby Vee, and Dion all topped the chart for the first time. In November, Jimmy Dean reached number one on the Hot 100 for the first and only time with "Big Bad John". The song was a triple chart-topper, also reaching the peak position on Billboard's easy listening and country charts. The Marvelettes and the Tokens both reached number one for the first time in December. The Marvelettes' "Please Mr. Postman" was the first number-one pop single on the influential Motown record label. It is one of several of 1961's number ones to have been included on iterations of Rolling Stone magazine's list of the 500 greatest songs of all time, along with "Will You Love Me Tomorrow", "Runaway", "Hit the Road Jack" by Ray Charles, and "Runaround Sue" by Dion.

== Chart history ==
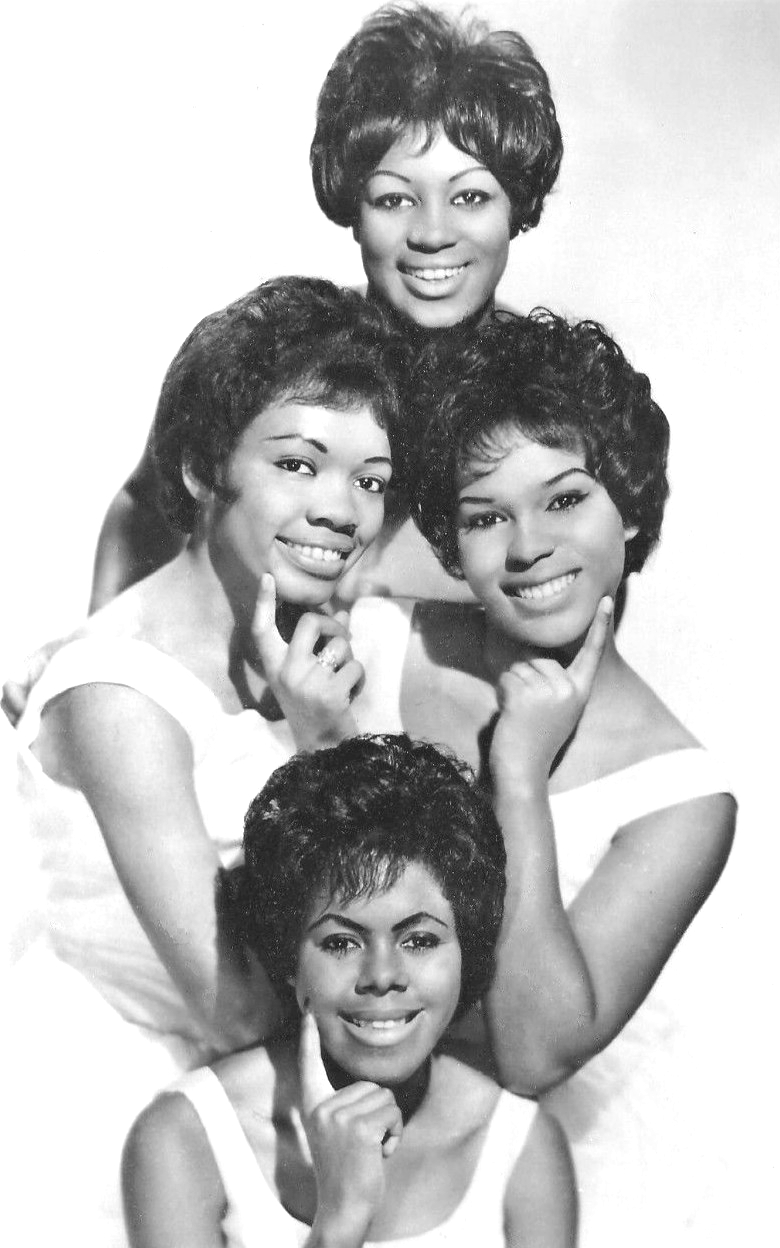
The Shirelles were the first girl group to top the Hot 100.

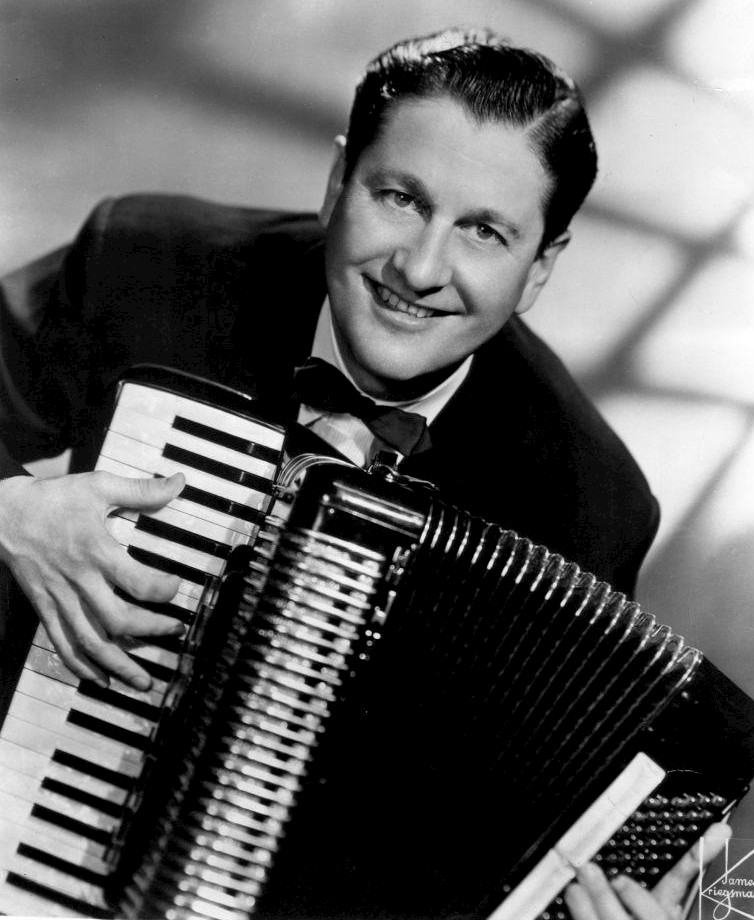
"Calcutta" was a chart-topper for Lawrence Welk.

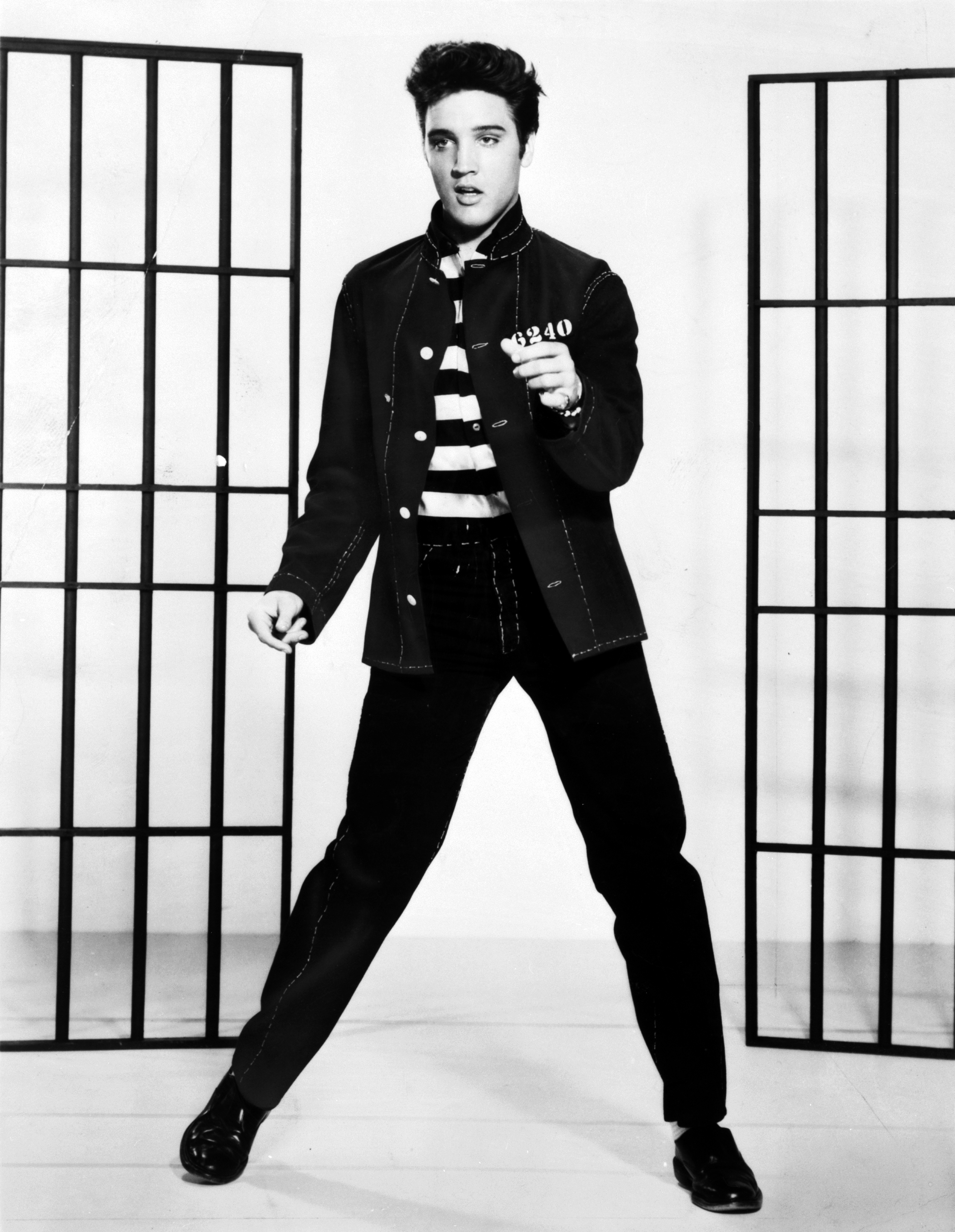
Elvis Presley was the only act with more than one number one during 1961.

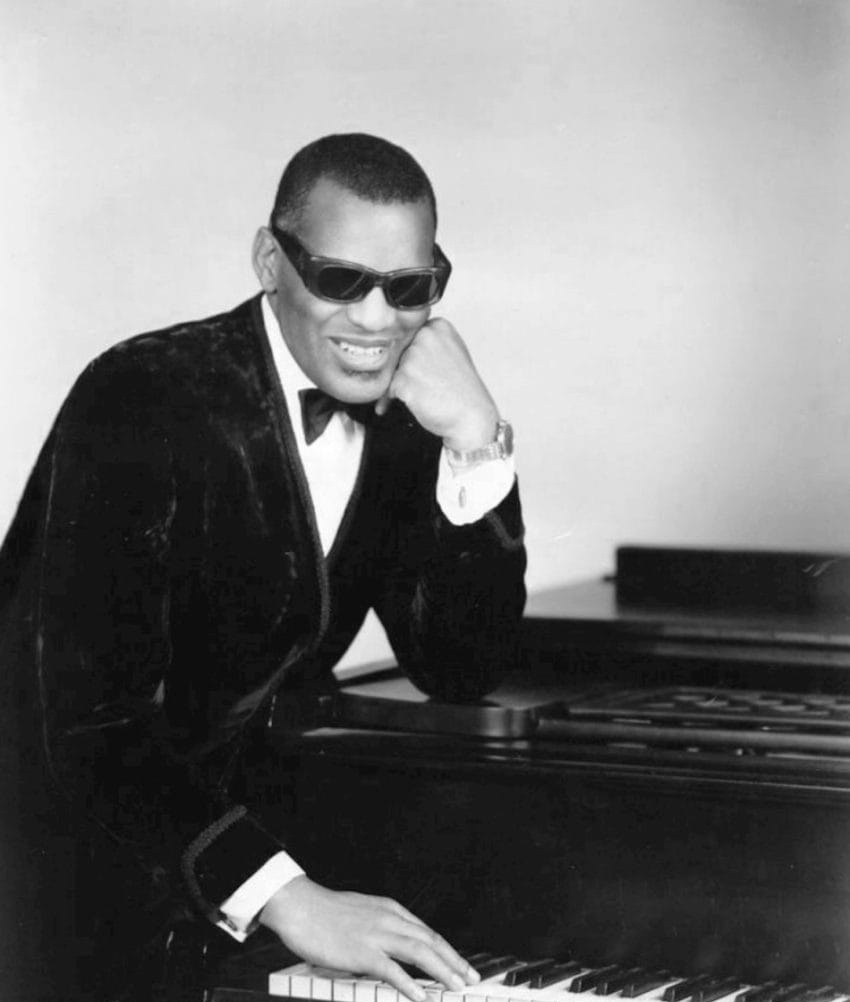
Ray Charles took "Hit the Road Jack" to number one.

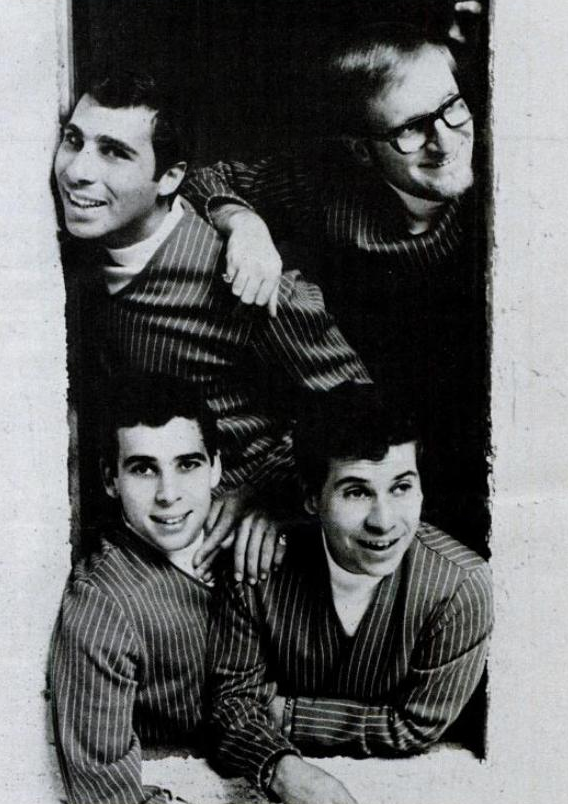
The Tokens ended the year at number one.

Chart history
No. (Note: The "No." column indicates the numerical sequence of number ones in Hot 100 history. "Re" indicates a single returning to number one.)	Issue date	Title	Artist(s)	Ref.
42	January 2	"Are You Lonesome Tonight?"	Elvis Presley	
43	January 9	"Wonderland by Night"	Bert Kaempfert	
43	January 16	"Wonderland by Night"	Bert Kaempfert	
43	January 23	"Wonderland by Night"	Bert Kaempfert	
44	January 30	"Will You Love Me Tomorrow"	The Shirelles	
44	February 6	"Will You Love Me Tomorrow"	The Shirelles	
45	February 13	"Calcutta"	Lawrence Welk	
45	February 20	"Calcutta"	Lawrence Welk	
46	February 27	"Pony Time"	Chubby Checker	
46	March 6	"Pony Time"	Chubby Checker	
46	March 13	"Pony Time"	Chubby Checker	
47	March 20	"Surrender"	Elvis Presley	
47	March 27	"Surrender"	Elvis Presley	
48	April 3	"Blue Moon"	The Marcels	
48	April 10	"Blue Moon"	The Marcels	
48	April 17	"Blue Moon"	The Marcels	
49	April 24	"Runaway"	Del Shannon	
49	May 1	"Runaway"	Del Shannon	
49	May 8	"Runaway"	Del Shannon	
49	May 15	"Runaway"	Del Shannon	
50	May 22	"Mother-in-Law"	Ernie K-Doe	
51	May 29	"Travelin' Man"	Ricky Nelson	
52	June 5	"Running Scared"	Roy Orbison	
51 (re)	June 12	"Travelin' Man"	Ricky Nelson	
53	June 19	"Moody River"	Pat Boone	
54	June 26	"Quarter to Three"	U.S. Bonds	
54	July 3	"Quarter to Three"	U.S. Bonds	
55	July 10	"Tossin' and Turnin'"	Bobby Lewis	
55	July 17	"Tossin' and Turnin'"	Bobby Lewis	
55	July 24	"Tossin' and Turnin'"	Bobby Lewis	
55	July 31	"Tossin' and Turnin'"	Bobby Lewis	
55	August 7	"Tossin' and Turnin'"	Bobby Lewis	
55	August 14	"Tossin' and Turnin'"	Bobby Lewis	
55	August 21	"Tossin' and Turnin'"	Bobby Lewis	
56	August 28	"Wooden Heart"	Joe Dowell	
57	September 4	"Michael"	The Highwaymen	
57	September 11	"Michael"	The Highwaymen	
58	September 18	"Take Good Care of My Baby"	Bobby Vee	
58	September 25	"Take Good Care of My Baby"	Bobby Vee	
58	October 2	"Take Good Care of My Baby"	Bobby Vee	
59	October 9	"Hit the Road Jack"	Ray Charles	
59	October 16	"Hit the Road Jack"	Ray Charles	
60	October 23	"Runaround Sue"	Dion	
60	October 30	"Runaround Sue"	Dion	
61	November 6	"Big Bad John"	Jimmy Dean	
61	November 13	"Big Bad John"	Jimmy Dean	
61	November 20	"Big Bad John"	Jimmy Dean	
61	November 27	"Big Bad John"	Jimmy Dean	
61	December 4	"Big Bad John"	Jimmy Dean	
62	December 11	"Please Mr. Postman"	The Marvelettes	
63	December 18	"The Lion Sleeps Tonight"	The Tokens	
63	December 25	"The Lion Sleeps Tonight"	The Tokens	

== Number-one artists ==
List of number-one artists by total weeks at number one
Weeks at No. 1	Artist
7	Bobby Lewis
5	Jimmy Dean
4	Del Shannon
3	Bert Kaempfert
3	Chubby Checker
3	Elvis Presley
3	The Marcels
3	Bobby Vee
2	The Shirelles
2	Lawrence Welk
2	Ricky Nelson
2	U.S. Bonds
2	The Highwaymen
2	Ray Charles
2	Dion
2	The Tokens
1	Ernie K-Doe
1	Roy Orbison
1	Pat Boone
1	Joe Dowell
1	The Marvelettes

== See also ==
- 1961 in music
- List of Billboard number-one singles
- List of Billboard Hot 100 top-ten singles in 1961
- List of Billboard Hot 100 number-one singles from 1958 to 1969
