= Stars for a Summer Night =

1961 compilation album of easy listening and classical music

Compilation album by Various
- Released: 1961
- Genres: Pop; jazz; classical
- Length: Disk 1 -- 33:15 / Disk 2 -- 53:06
- Label: Columbia

Stars for a Summer Night is a two-disk LP of previously recorded tracks, produced for release in the summer of 1961, which became one of the best-selling records of the year.

== Concept ==
In June 1961, to stimulate sales, Columbia Records released a two-disk compilation album titled Stars for a Summer Night. It was a promotional, low-priced sampler that showcased some of the label's most popular recording artists with tracks from their previously released LPs. RCA Victor pioneered the concept of a sampling of a label's artists with its 1949 release Theme Songs. Columbia had earlier experimented with samplers in its 1956 release Having Wonderful Time, Wish You Would Hear . . . .

On one disk, Stars for a Summer Night provided largely easy listening selections, accompanied by two jazz performances. The second record in the set was released as a Columbia Masterworks disk, with 13 tracks of classical compositions. The album's liner notes declared that the "summer" theme of the collection would provide listening pleasure "on the front porch or on picnics, at the beach or in the mountains."

== Reception and chart history ==
Stars for a Summer Night was an immediate success in the summer of 1961. In less than three months after its release, Columbia reported that the public had purchased more than a half million copies.

The album spent nine consecutive weeks at number one on the Billboard stereo albums chart beginning the week of July 17, 1961. It spent four weeks at number one on the mono chart. The album was on the charts for 40 weeks.

== Honors and recognition ==
The National Association of Record Manufacturers named Stars for a Summer Night the Best Selling Economy Price LP at its annual awards banquet in April 1962.

Cash Box magazine ranked Stars for a Summer Night 27th of the top 50 stereo albums of 1961, and 32nd of the top 50 monaural albums.

Stars for a Summer Night has been included in the online collection of the National Museum of American History.

The success of Stars for a Summer Night prompted Columbia in 1963 to issue a follow-on set titled Songs for a Summer Night, a two-record set comprising tracks from a broader variety of musical genres.

== Subsequent release ==
In 2013, Sepia Recordings released an expanded version of Stars for a Summer Night in a two-CD collection, with an additional 20 tracks of popular and classical recordings.

== Track listing ==
Disk 1 – Columbia Records

Track	Title	Composer	Artist	Time
1	"Summertime"	George Gershwin, DuBose Heyward	Ray Conniff & His Orchestra & Chorus	2:45
2	"Jeanie with the Light Brown Hair"	Stephen Foster	The Dave Brubeck Quartet	2:28
3	"In the Evening by the Moonlight" ”Listen to the Mocking Bird" "While Strolling Through the Park One Day"	James A. Bland; Alice Hawthorne, Richard Milburn; Ed Haley	Music by De Vol	2:37
4	"Lazy Afternoon”	Jerome Moross, John La Touche	Les & Larry Elgart and Their Orchestra	2:45
5	"Bouquet"	Percy Faith	The Percy Faith Strings	3:22
6	"By the Campfire”	Traditional	Andre Kostelanez & His Orchestra	2:33
7	"Stairway to the Stars”	Matty Malneck, Frank Signorelli, Mitchell Parish	Bobby Hackett	3:17
8	"Star Eyes"	Gene de Paul, Don Raye	The Art Van Damme Quintet	2:50
9	"It's a Wonderful World"	Harold Adamson, Jan Savitt, John K. Watson	Les Brown & His Band of Renown	2:41
10	"Just Friends"	John Klenner, Sam M. Lewis	Billy Butterfield	2:18
11	"Like Love"	Dorothy Langdon, André Previn	André Previn	3:05
12	"Ramona"	L. Wolfe Gilbert, Mabel Wayne	Jerry Murad's Harmonicats	2:34

Disk 2 – Columbia Masterworks

Track	Title	Composer	Artist	Time
1	"March" from "The Love for Three Oranges"	Sergei Prokofiev	The Columbia Symphony Orchestra	1:33
2	"Waltz of the Flowers" from "'Nutcracker Suite"	Pyotr Ilyich Tchaikovsky	New York Philharmonic	6:28
3	"Second Movement (Scherzando)" from "Symphonie espagnole"	Édouard Lalo	New York Philharmonic	4:11
4	"Russian Sailors' Dance" from "The Red Poppy”	Reinhold Glière	Philadelphia Orchestra	3:29
5	"Waltz No. 7 In C-Sharp Minor, Op. 64, No. 2"	Frédéric Chopin	Alexander Brailowsky	3:19
6	"One Fine Day (Un Bel Di)" from "Madame Butterfly"	Giacomo Puccini	Eileen Farrell; The Columbia Symphony Orchestra	4:46
7	"Can-Can”	Jacques Offenbach	New York Philharmonic	4:13
8	"Fantasia On Greensleeves"	Ralph Vaughan Williams	Philadelphia Orchestra	5:00
9	"Clair De Lune"	Claude Debussy	Philippe Entremont	5:07
10	"Londonderry Air"	Traditional	Mormon Tabernacle Choir; Philadelphia Orchestra	4:09
11	"Liebestraum"	Franz Liszt	Ivan Davis	4:46
12	"The Stars Were Shining" from "Tosca"	Giacomo Puccini	Richard Tucker; The Columbia Symphony Orchestra	2:52
13	"Hoe-Down" from Rodeo"	Aaron Copland	New York Philharmonic	3:13
