= Seamans =

Seamans is a surname. Notable people with the surname include:

- Clarence Seamans, an American typewriter manufacturer
- Hubert Seamans, a Canadian businessman
- Robert Seamans, an American administrator at NASA
- Sam Seamans, an Assisting Bishop in the Reformed Episcopal Church

== See also ==
- Robert C. Seamans (ship), a steel brigantine
