= Seeman (surname) =

Seeman is a surname. Notable people with the surname include:

- Seeman (born 1966), Indian politician, actor and former director
- Bonnie Seeman (born 1969), American ceramist
- Ed Seeman (1931–2025), American animator and film director
- Enoch Seeman (fl. 1694–1739), painter
- Jerry Seeman (1936–2013), American football official
- John Seeman, pornographic actor and director
- Melvin Seeman (1918–2020), American social psychologist
- Nadrian Seeman (born 1945), American chemist and nanoscientist
- Philip Seeman (born 1934), Canadian schizophrenia researcher and neuropharmacologist
- Roxanne Seeman (born 1954), American musician

== See also ==
- Seaman (disambiguation)
- Seemann (disambiguation)
- Zeeman (disambiguation)
- Seeman (film), a 1994 film
