= Seemann (Lolita song) =

1960 song by Lolita, covered by Petula Clark

"Seemann (deine Heimat ist das Meer)"

Single by Lolita
- B-side: "La Luna (Quando La Luna)"; (original A-side)
- Released: February 1960
- Recorded: 15 December 1959 (original version) Austrophon-Schallplatten-Studio (Konzerthaus, Vienna)
- Genre: Traditional pop
- Length: 2:48
- Label: Polydor
- Songwriters: Werner Scharfenberger, Fini Busch
- Producer: Gerhard Mendelson

Lolita German singles chronology
"Treu Will Ich Dir Bleiben" (1959)	"Seemann (deine Heimat ist das Meer)" (1960)	"Die Sterne der Prärie" (1960)

"Sailor (Your Home is the Sea)"

Single by Lolita

from the album Sailor, "Sailor" and Lolita's Greatest German Hits
- B-side: "La Luna (Quando La Luna)"
- Released: August 1960
- Recorded: 15 December 1959 (original version) Austrophon-Schallplatten-Studio (Konzerthaus, Vienna) • track modified 1960 Polydor; 1 Studio Hamburg (Rahlstedt)
- Genre: Traditional pop
- Length: 2:48
- Label: Kapp
- Songwriters: Werner Scharfenberger, Fini Busch, Alan Holt (English spoken word section)
- Producer: Gerhard Mendelson

Lolita US singles chronology
"Sieben Berge" (1960)	"Sailor (Your Home is the Sea)" (1960)	"Cowboy Jimmy Joe (Die Sterne der Prärie)" (1961)

"Seemann (Deine Heimat ist das Meer)" (English translation "Sailor (Your Home is the Sea)") is a song originally written in German by Werner Scharfenberger (de) and lyricist Fini Busch (de). A 1959 German-language recording by Lolita became an international hit in 1960–61.

The song was covered in a number of languages, most notably by Petula Clark who had her first #1 UK hit with the English-language rendering "Sailor". Clark was also afforded international success with both "Sailor" and the French-language rendering "Marin". A rival version by Anne Shelton was a Top Ten UK hit, concluding her chart career. Other singers for whom "Sailor (Your Home is the Sea)" brought success as rendered in various languages include: Scandinavian singers Thory Bernhards and Towa Carson "Sjöman" (Swedish) and Jan Høiland "Sjömann" (Norwegian); Caterina Valente, who had a Flemish hit with "Zeeman (Je verlangen is de zee)"( Dutch;) a 1981 hit in the Netherlands for Ciska Peters (nl); and Virginia Lee (af) whose "Seeman" (Afrikaans) was a successful local cover in South Africa.

A schlager-style number, "Sailor" with its original German lyric, addresses a seafaring love object with an acceptance of his wanderlust: the English-language version inverts this sentiment turning the song into a plea for the sailor to return. The song is sometimes sung by male vocalists from the point of view of the sailor with the lyrics adjusted accordingly.

== Original German-language version ==
=== Lolita version ===
Prior to "Seemann (Deine Heimat ist das Meer)", Viennese singer Lolita had based her career on schlager numbers with Latin or Polynesian themes. Making her recording debut in 1957, Lolita had had four Top 20 hits on the German charts notably with "Der Weiße Mond Von Maratonga" (number 2, 1957). This was her career best charting as in 1958–59 Lolita's seventh through eleventh single releases all peaked outside the Top 20.

"Seemann..." was recorded by Lolita in a 15 December 1959 session at the Austrophon-Schallplatten-Studio located in the Konzerthaus, Vienna, overseen by Gerhard Mendelson (de) The song's composers Werner Scharfenberger—who was the regular conductor on Lolita's recordings—and Fini Busch had written "Der weiße Mond von Maratonga" and other songs previously recorded by Lolita: however it was another track from the 15 December session which was intended to be Lolita's next A-side release: a cover of the Italian single "Quando la luna" by Corrado Lojacono entitled "La Luna", "Seemann..." having been expediently written to serve as a B-side. Lyricist Fini Busch recalled that she and Scharfenberger "were commissioned to write a song completely 'on the fly'" to serve as B-side for the completed track "La Luna"; "the producer said 'I couldn't care less. Write anything you want to back it'." However it was "Seemann..." which entered Germany's Top 20 in March 1960: peaking at number two that June. It remained in the Top 20 for ten months and was the fourth biggest hit in Germany for the year 1960. ("La Luna" would have a belated turn as an A-side reaching number thirty on the German charts in December 1960.)

After Decca Records, who had first refusal on US release for Polydor recordings, passed on "Seemann..." the track was optioned by Kapp Records, a US independent label headed by Decca president Jack Kapp's brother David Kapp. "Banjo-Boy" a German number one hit sung in German by Jan and Kjeld (de) had recently afforded Kapp Records a regional US hit with a number fifty-eight peak on the Billboard Hot 100 in Billboard magazine, and the label evidently saw potential for similar success with "Seemann..." by Lolita. To increase the appeal of "Seemann..." for the US market, a section spoken in English by Maureen René (de) was overdubbed on to the track at Polydor Studio Hamburg (Rahlstedt). For writing the new English recitation the name of Alan Holt—a pseudonym for label head David Kapp—was listed with Werner Scharfenberger and Fini Busch in the songwriting credits for the modified version of "Seemann..., which was re-titled "Sailor (Your Home is On the Sea)" and issued in the US in September 1961.

After breaking in San Francisco and Chicago "Sailor" made its Billboard Hot 100 debut at number seventy-six on the chart dated 24 October 1960 to rise to a Hot 100 peak of number five in December 1960, becoming the first German-language song to rise to the US Top Ten, a feat repeated only in 1984 by the number two hit "99 Luftballons" by Nena and in 1986 by the number one hit "Rock Me Amadeus" by Falco (musician). In the wake of Lolita's success, her album Unvergessene Melodien was issued in America by Kapp under the title Sailor, Sailor and Lolita's Greatest Hits, and a second single, "Cowboy Jimmy Joe (Die Sterne der Prärie)," was also released, though it only reached number 94.

The strong US response to "Sailor..." has been attributed to the then-current immense US media interest in Germany due to the political situation in Berlin and also Elvis Presley's serving in the US Army's Third Armored Division along the East-West German border. At the same time "Sailor" rode the U.S. charts, the German melodies "Wonderland by Night" and "Calcutta" were becoming number one hits in instrumental versions by Bert Kaempfert and Lawrence Welk respectively, with "Wonderland..." also reaching the Top 20 in an English-language vocal version by Anita Bryant. Later in 1961, Joe Dowell had a number one hit with his cover of Presley's take on the German folk song "Muss I Denn" titled "Wooden Heart", sung partially in German. A spate of other German-language 45s by other artists such as Willy Millowitsch, Heidi Bruehl, and Marlene Stolz, were also issued in the United States, although none of these were successful.

"Sailor..." also afforded Lolita a hit in Australia (number six), Japan (Top Ten), and the Netherlands (number seven). In New Zealand it reached number eight despite the number one ranking achieved there by the Petula Clark's English-language rendering "Sailor". "Seemann..." was also a hit in Flemish Belgium reaching number twelve co-ranked with Petula Clark's English rendition "Sailor". Lolita's "Seemann..." had its most intense chart impact in Norway where it was number one for nine weeks in the spring of 1961 with sales of 50,000 units recognized in October 1961 with the awarding of a Gold Disc. In Sweden "Seemann..." reached number five co-ranked with the local cover version "Sjöman" by Towa Carson: however Lolita's "Seemann..." was number one for a total of eleven weeks (3 February-21 April 1961) according to the Swedish music paper Show Business.

On 17 January 1961 Lolita was awarded a gold record for sales of one million units for "Seemann (Deine Heimat Ist Das Meer)" in Germany: the eventual estimate for global sales of her single ""Seemann (Deine Heimat Ist Das Meer)"/ "Sailor (Your Home is the Sea)" was two million units.

Lolita can be heard singing "Seemann..." on the soundtrack of the film Schick Deine Frau nicht nach Italien (de) which premiered 22 September 1960.

Lolita re-recorded "Seemann... for her 1973 album Seemannslieder while a later re-recording reportedly from the late 1980s was remixed as a dance track in 2006 and issued as Seemann 2006.

Dickie Goodman's 1961 novelty single, "The Touchables," included a sample from "Seemann..." as the Touchables' oath, which they sang repeatedly.

=== Remakes in German ===
In 1984, "99 Luftballons" by the group Nena reached number two on the Billboard Hot 100, ousting Lolita's "Seemann..." as the highest charting US hit sung in German. Coincidentally in 2008 the former vocalist of that group who pursued a solo career as Nena recorded "Seemann..." as "Seemann, lass das Träumen" for a multi-artist album of nautical-themed songs entitled Captains Club - Bis Ans Ende der Welt.

"Seemann..." has also been remade by Manuela as "Seemann, deine Heimat ist das Meer" for her 1964 self-titled album, by the Günter Kallmann (de) Chor as "Seemann" for their 1965 album Serenade am Meer; by Freddy Quinn as "Seemann deine Heimat ist das Meer" for his 1969 album Freddy auf hoher See; by United Balls (de) as "Seemann (deine Heimat ist das Meer)" for their 1982 album Lieder fremder Völker; by Klaus & Klaus (de) as "Seemann (Deine Heimat ist das Meer) on a 2007 EP; by Géraldine Olivier as "Seemann, deine Heimat ist das Meer" for her 2009 album Maritime Welthits der 50er und 60er; by Oesch’s die Dritten as "Seemann-Medley" (medley of "Seemann deine Heimat ist das Meer" and "Aloha ʻOe") their 2007 Jodel-Time album; and by Andrea Berg whose dance-pop remake - entitled "Seemann, deine Heimat ist das Meer" - was included on the deluxe version (known as the "Tour Edition") of her 2011 album Schwerelos.

Bobby Helms remade "Seeman..." under the title "Sailor (Your Home is on the Sea). His version, recorded 29 October 1965 in Nashville, was issued in January 1966 both as the B-side of his single "Those Snowy Blowy Glowy Days of Winter" and on Helms' album I'm the Man.

The Swedish dansband Vikingarna used the German title "Seemann" for the instrumental version of the song featured on their 1977 album Kramgoa Låtar 5.

== Zeeman: Dutch version ==
""Zeeman (Je verlangen is de zee)""

Single by Caterina Valente
- B-side: "Caro mio"
- Released: October 1960
- Recorded: Fonior SA-Decca Studio (Jette) 1960
- Genre: Traditional pop
- Length: 2:39
- Label: Decca
- Songwriters: Werner Scharfenberger, Fini Busch (original German lyrics), Willy Rex (Dutch lyrics)

Caterina Valente Dutch/ Flemish singles chronology
"Er Is Geen Dag (The Honeymoon Song)" (1960)	""Zeeman (Je verlangen is de zee)"" (1960)	"Ein Schiff Wird Kommen" (1960)

In the autumn of 1960 "Zeeman (Je verlangen is de zee)" by Caterina Valente reached number ten on the charts for the Flemish Region of Belgium: the track made its album debut on the 1962 Valente compilation Caterina On Tour.

In 1981 Ciska Peters (nl) remade the song as "Zeeman, je verlangen is de zee"; it reached number nineteen on the Netherlands hit parade.

In August 2009 Janneke de Roo (nl) performed "Zeeman" as a musical guest at Delfsail (nl) with response positive enough to warrant her recording the song with producer Kees Tel (nl). Released on 15 September 2015, this version, which set the song to a dance-pop beat, was promoted with a video—showing de Roo singing on a sandbar and aboard a clipper moored at the Delfzijl quay—which regularly aired on the Dutch music channels Sterren.nl and TV Oranje facilitating a two-week tenure for the track on the Single Top 100, ranking at number ninety-four in September 2009 and at number ninety-eight on 3 October 2009. "Zeeman" was featured on de Roo's 2010 album release Onvergetelijk.

"Zeeman" has also been recorded by the Fouryo's (as "Zeeman je verlangen is de zee") (nl), by Annie Palmen (as "Sailor", released April 1961), by Lisa Del Bo for her 1999 album Best of the Sixties, and by Marjan Berger (nl) for her 2014 album Jij bent een wonder.

== Scandinavian versions ==
Denmark (Danish) "Sømand, mon du drømmer?" was recorded in 1960 by Katy Bødtger with Ole Mortensen (da) conducting the orchestra.

Norway (Norwegian) "Sjømann" was recorded in 1960 by Jan Høiland and also by Franz Løberg (no): Høiland's version rose as high as number two on the Norwegian charts for the first and second week of February 1961 being kept from the number one spot by the original "Seemann...". "Sjømann" was later recorded by the Kjell Karlsen Orkester for their 1973 album Spanske Øyne: the vocalist on the track being We-Be Karlsen (no); by Hans Petter Hansen (no) on his 1974 album Jeg kommer snart igjen; and by Ronald Holmberg (no) on his 2000 album Ronald 7.

Sweden (Swedish) "Sjöman" was first recorded by Thory Bernhards (sv) in a 12 October 1960 session. Her version entered the best selling lists in Januari 1961 and peaked at number seven. The Swedish lyrics being the work of Åke Gerhard whose composition "Ann-Caroline", first sung by Bernhards, had coincidentally developed into "Lay Down Your Arms" the career record of Anne Shelton who had a Top Ten UK hit with "Sailor". Bernhards' rendition of "Sjöman" was utilized in the soundtrack of the German film Schick Deine Frau nicht nach Italien (de) in its Swedish release replacing Lolita's German-language original "Seemann (Deine Heimat ist das Meer)" (see Section 1.1 for details). The hit recording of "Sjöman" was that by Towa Carson which first charted in Sweden in tandem with "Seemann..." by Lolita with a number five peak with a subsequent charting as a double A-sided hit with "Sista Dansen" (i.e. "Save the Last Dance for Me") reaching number nine in June 1961. With three best selling versions of that song, "Seeman/Sjöman" became the most popular song in Sweden 1961 collecting 12.662 points, followed by Danish Eurovision entry "Angelique" by Dario Campeotto (7.622 points) according to the record magazin Show Business. "Sjöman" was also recorded in 1960 by Inger Jacobsen.

== Sailor: English-language version ==
see Sailor.

== Marin: French-language version ==
see Marin.

== Versions in other languages ==
The Afrikaans rendering entitled "Seeman" was recorded by Virginia Lee (af) and was ranked as the number eight hit for the year 1960 on the South African hit parade. This version was subsequently recorded by Gé Korsten for his 1967 album Seeman, and also in 1969 by Cornelia.

"Seemann (Deine Heimat ist das Meer)" has been the source of two distinct Czech renderings: "Svítí maják" recorded by Yvetta Simonová (cs) in 1967, and "Vím jen, že se vzdálím" recorded by Ladislav Vodička for his 1996 album Starej Voda po 20-ti letech.

The Estonian rendering "Meremees, kus on su kodu?" has been recorded by Vello Orumets (et) and also by Toivo Nikopensius (et).

Faroese singer Fríðbjørg Jensen (fo) has recorded the song as "Kom og set teg her".

The Finnish rendering "Merimies, kotimaasi on meri" was first recorded by Ritva Mustonen (fi) in 1960 and recorded in 1961 by Laila Kinnunen. "Merimies..." has since been remade by Eino Grön for his 1983 album Merellä ja Kotisatamassa, by Lea Laven for her 1988 album Bluebird, and by the Charlies (fi) for their 1999 album Kauneimmat Hetket.

In 1963 Patrick Jaque a Belgian singer, resident in Spain, recorded a Spanish-language version of "Seeman..." titled "Marinero". Another Spanish-language version titled "Hombre de los Mares" was recorded by Los Paraguayos for their 2014 album Fiesta Romantica recorded for the Munich-based Telamo (de) label.

The Portuguese version "Marinheiro" was recorded in 1962 by Brazilian singer Fernando José.

"Seemann..." has also been rendered in Croatian: "Mornar" by Anica Zubović (hr) (1968), and also in Italian: "Sailor (La tua casa e' il mare)" by Lucia Altieri (it) (1962).
