= Ciska Peters =

Dutch singer

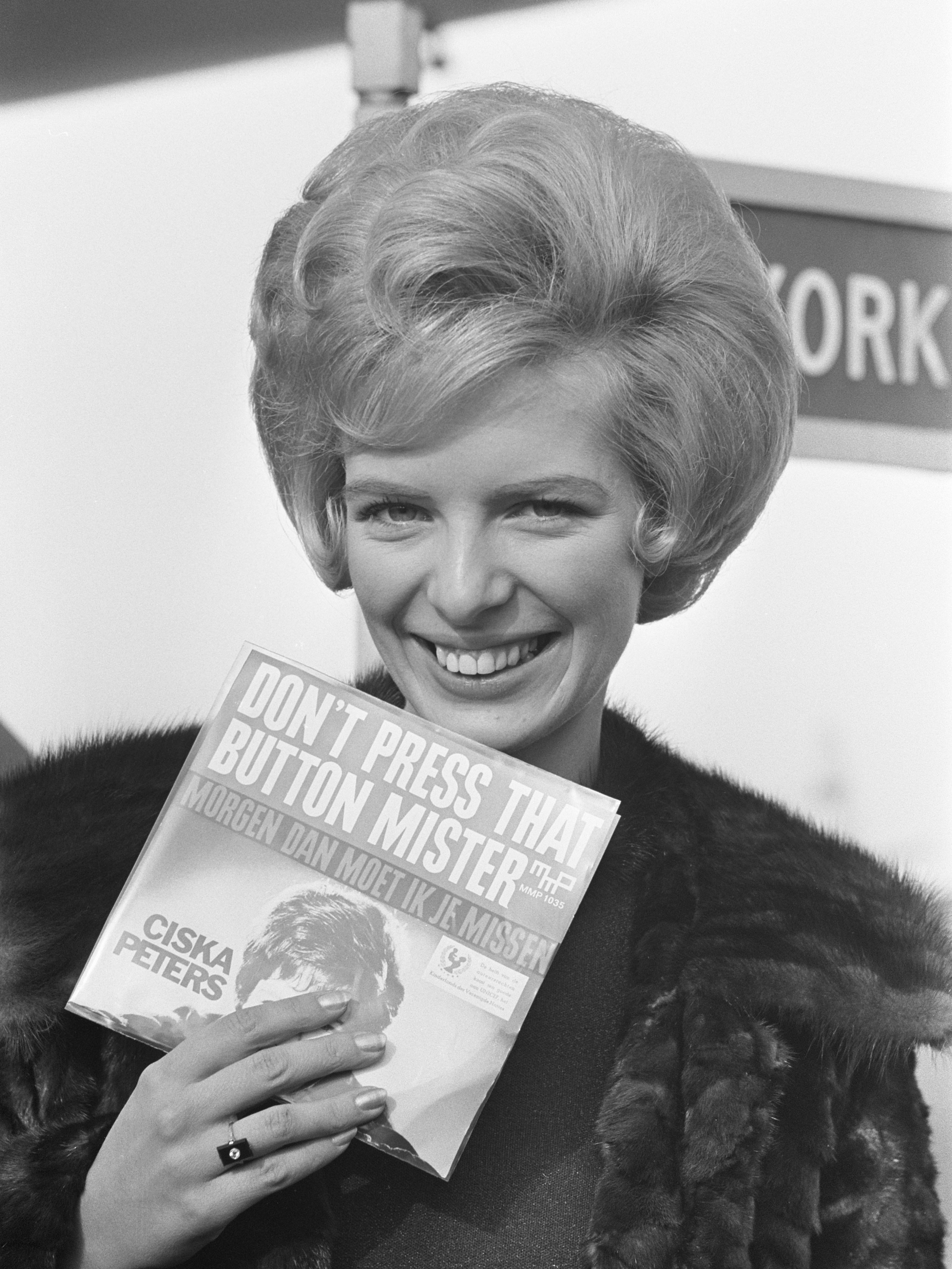
- Peters in New York, 1964

Background information
- Born: 1 June 1945 (age 80); Nijmegen, Netherlands
- Genres: Pop
- Years active: 1962 - 1980s
- Labels: CNR, MMP, Negram, Philips, Polydor, Telefunken

Ciska Peters is a female singer from the Netherlands who had success in the 1970s and 1980s with six hits during that period. She is remembered for her hits "Dans Naar de Zon", "España Mañana", "Zo Zal Deze Zomer Zijn" and "De Zwarte Kat".

== Background ==
Peters was born in Nijmegen, the Netherlands on 1 June 1945. She married Pim ter Linde, a Royal Netherlands Air Force photographer. They had a son called Mark Robert.

== Career ==
=== 1960s ===
Her career began in 1962, shortly after winning the Radio Luxembourg grand prize.

In 1963, she had three singles released. The first single was "Wie Weet" backed with "Lorelei". The A side was written by Lia Houten and Willy Gösson. The B side was written by Rick Shorter and Lance Lehmberg, and was originally recorded by Rick & Lance and released as "Laura Lee". The other two singles for that year were "Pardon Mon Ami" backed with "Vielleicht", and "Zal Ik Jou Weer Zien (Bis Zum Nächsten Mal)" backed with "Diggeldy Doing (Diggeldy Boeing)".

It was reported in the 27 March 1965 issue of Billboard that Gerit van der Meent of CNR Records was expecting high sales from her new records.

=== 1970s ===
She had a hit in 1973 with "Zo Zal Deze Zomer Zijn" which got to no. 25 and spent seven weeks in the charts. "España Mañana" made the charts in 1974. In Belgium, it spent three weeks in the charts, peaking at no. 20. In 1975, she had a hit with "Dans Naar De Zon" which spent five weeks in the charts, peaking at no. 19.

=== 1980s ===
"De zwarte kat," a version of Bacharach/David's "With Open Arms," made the charts in 1981, spending six weeks there, peaking at no. 34. 1981 "Zeeman"..Fef Personal listening to Radio Veronica in Hilversum 1981
