= Zeeman (surname) =

Zeeman is a surname. Notable people with the surname include:

- Pieter Zeeman (1865–1943), Dutch physicist and 1902 Nobel laureate, discoverer of the Zeeman effect
- Reinier Nooms (aka "Zeeman"), (c.1623–1664), a Dutch painter, etcher and engraver
- Christopher Zeeman (1925–2016), mathematician
- Carling Zeeman (born 1991), Canadian rower
- Michaël Zeeman (1958–2009), prominent Dutch journalist, author, editor, columnist and literary critic
- Nicolette Zeeman (born 1956), British literary scholar
- Richard Zeeman, a fictional character in the Anita Blake: Vampire Hunter series of novels by Laurell K. Hamilton
