= Wonderland by Night (album) =

- US cover art

Studio album by Bert Kaempfert and his orchestra
- Released: 1960
- Label: Polydor, Decca

Wonderland by Night is a 1960 album by Bert Kaempfert and his orchestra, released by Polydor in Europe and by Decca in the United States and Canada.

== Release ==
The album was originally issued on LP (cat. nos. Polydor 46353 and Decca DL 4101).

== Reception ==
Professional ratings
Review scores
Source	Rating
AllMusic	3/5 stars

The album spent several weeks at No. 1 on the Billboard's Monaural LPs chart.

In a retrospective review for AllMusic, Bruce Eder rated the album 3 stars.

== Track listing ==
12-inch LP (Decca DL 4101)

No.	Title	Writer(s)	Length
1.	"Wonderland by Night" ("Wunderland bei Nacht")	Klaus Günter Neumann
2.	"La vie en rose"	Louiguy—Édith Piaf
3.	"Happiness Never Comes Too Late" ("Das Glück kommt nie zu spät")	Bert Kaempfert
4.	"On the Alamo"	Isham Jones—Gus Kahn
5.	"As I Love You"	Jay Livingston—Ray Evans
6.	Untitled	Bert Kaempfert

No.	Title	Writer(s)	Length
1.	"Tammy"	Jay Livingston—Ray Evans
2.	"The Aim of My Desires" ("Das Ziel meiner Wünsche")	Peter Moesser
3.	"This Song Is Yours Alone" ("Dieses Lied gehört nur dir")	Bert Kaempfert
4.	"Drifting and Dreaming" ("Sweet Paradise")	Van Alstyne—Schmidt—Gillespie—Curtin
5.	"Stay with Me"	Bert Kaempfert
6.	"Lullaby for Lovers"	Bert Kaempfert

== Charts ==
Chart (1961)	Peak position
US Billboard Top LPs / Monaural LPs	1

== See also ==
- List of Billboard number-one albums of 1961
