= Pony Time =

Single by Chubby Checker
- B-side: "Oh Susannah"
- Released: January 1961
- Recorded: 1960
- Genre: R&B
- Length: 2:27
- Label: Parkway 818
- Songwriters: Don Covay, John Berry

Chubby Checker singles chronology
"The Hucklebuck" (1960)	"Pony Time" (1961)	"The Mess Around" (1961)

"Pony Time" is a song written by Don Covay and John Berry (a member of Covay's earlier vocal group, "the Rainbows"), and originally recorded in 1960 by Covay with his group "the Goodtimers".

It achieved greater success when it was recorded by Chubby Checker the following year, becoming his second US No.1 (after his 1960 single "The Twist"). Chubby Checker's recording of "Pony Time" was also a No.1 hit on the R&B charts. In Canada it reached No. 5.

The "Boogety Shoe" phrase was used in Barry Mann's hit song "Who Put the Bomp (in the Bomp, Bomp, Bomp)" (1961).

The lyrics reverse the Gee and Haw commands. In use by horsemen for centuries, gee was right and haw was left. Beside being used to command horse teams, Gee and Haw was used a lot in naming geographic features, like stream branches.

== Charts ==
Chart (1961)	Peak position
Canada (CHUM Chart)	5
US Billboard Hot 100	1

== In popular culture ==
A reference to the new dance style is made in the song "Back to the Hop" (1961) by Danny and the Juniors, and the song was featured in the 1988 film Hairspray.

The song introduced a new dance style, the Pony, in which the dancer tries to look as if riding a horse. The beat is 1&2, 3&4. In the dance the feet are kept comfortably together, while various arm and hand motions are possible. Movement around the dance floor may occur, but there is no line-of-dance. Couples, who generally face each other, do not touch, and turns and chase positions are possible.

The Pony dance is mentioned also in the Wilson Pickett song "Land of a Thousand Dances", in the Nick Lowe song "I Knew the Bride", and in The Go-Go's song "We Got the Beat". Cindy Wilson of The B-52's can be seen performing the Pony in the video for their 1980 song, "Give Me Back My Man", as well as in other films of the band performing between 1978 and 1980 (including their 1980 appearance on Saturday Night Live). The band completed the period effect by wearing early '60s-style outfits and hairstyles.

== See also ==
- List of Hot 100 number-one singles of 1961 (U.S.)
- List of number-one R&B singles of 1961 (U.S.)
