= Tossin' and Turnin' =

Single by Bobby Lewis

from the album Tossin' & Turnin'
- B-side: "Oh Yes, I Love You"
- Released: April 30, 1961
- Recorded: Fall 1960
- Genre: R&B
- Length: 2:29
- Label: Beltone
- Songwriters: Ritchie Adams; Malou René
- Producer: Joe René

Bobby Lewis singles chronology
"Fire of Love" (1959)	"Tossin' and Turnin'" (1961)	"One Track Mind" (1961)

"Tossin' and Turnin'" is a song written by Ritchie Adams and Malou René, and originally recorded by Bobby Lewis in the fall of 1960. The record was released on the Beltone label in December 1960. It reached number one on both the Billboard Hot 100 on July 10, 1961, and R&B chart and has since become a standard on oldies compilations. It was named the number one single on the Billboard chart for 1961, after spending seven consecutive weeks at the top. It was also featured on the soundtrack for the 1978 film Animal House.

The song is about a man who is having trouble sleeping due to thinking of his lover. On the original hit single version, the track begins with Lewis singing "I couldn't sleep at all last night", and it appears this way on most oldies compilations. However, on some releases the song has a prelude, where Lewis sings "Baby...Baby...you did something to me", followed by a musical cue into the first verse. Lewis usually included this prelude when he performed the song live. According to several sources, the personnel on the original hit recording included guitarist Wild Jimmy Spruill.

Writing for Stereogum, Tom Breihan complimented the saxophone solo and called the song the "greatest insomnia-themed party anthem" in history. In 2008, Billboard magazine ranked the song as the 27th biggest song of all time that charted on the Billboard Hot 100, commemorating the 50th anniversary of the chart. It is one of only six songs from the 1960s to spend at least seven weeks in the number one position on the Billboard Hot 100.

== Charts ==
=== Weekly charts ===
Chart (1961)	Peak position
U.S. Billboard Hot 100	1

=== All-time charts ===
Chart (1958–2018)	Position
US Billboard Hot 100	36

== See also ==
- List of number-one R&B singles of 1961 (U.S.)
- List of Hot 100 number-one singles of 1961 (U.S.)
