= Bobby Lewis =

American singer (1925–2020)

- Born: Robert Alan Lewis; February 9, 1925; Indianapolis, Indiana, U.S.
- Died: April 28, 2020 (aged 95)
- Genres: Rhythm and blues; rock and roll
- Occupation: Singer
- Years active: 1950s–2020

Robert Alan Lewis (February 9, 1925 – April 28, 2020) was an American rock and roll and rhythm and blues singer, best known for his 1961 hit singles "Tossin' and Turnin'" and "One Track Mind".

== Biography ==
Lewis was born in Indianapolis, Indiana and was raised in an orphanage. He learned to play the piano by age six, despite very poor eyesight. Adopted at age twelve, he moved to a foster home in Detroit, Michigan, but ran away at the age of 14. Growing up with the influences of the pioneer blues musicians until the advent of rock and roll, Lewis began to build a musical career in the 1950s, initially working in carnival shows, and then as a singer with the Leo Hines Orchestra in Indianapolis. He made his first recordings for the Spotlight label, and then recorded "Mumbles Blues" for Chess Records in 1952. At one stage he was managed by Nat Tarnopol, who also managed Jackie Wilson.

Lewis moved to New York City, and his 1960 recording of "Tossin' and Turnin'" on the Beltone label went to No.1 for seven weeks on the Billboard chart in summer 1961. It sold over one million copies and was awarded a gold disc. Later in 1961, Lewis had a second Top Ten song, "One Track Mind", his only other major hit record (again on Beltone), charting at No. 9. Subsequent records were less successful. Beltone Records itself went out of business in 1963, and later recordings for ABC-Paramount and other labels were also commercial failures.

In a 2011 interview, Lewis said that he had lived in Newark, New Jersey since about 1980, and had become almost blind, but still performed occasionally.

Lewis died on April 28, 2020, aged 95, after contracting pneumonia.

== Discography ==
=== Singles ===
Year	Title	Peak chart positions				Record Label	B-side	Album
Year	Title	US Pop	US R&B	AUS	CAN	Record Label	B-side	Album
1957	"Mumbles Blues"	—	—	—	—	Mercury	"Oh Baby"	
1958	"Oh Mr. Somebody"	—	—	—	—	Mercury	"Yay, Yay, I Feel So Gay"	
1959	"Fire of Love"	—	—	—	—	Roulette	"You Better Stop"	
1961	"Tossin' and Turnin'"	1	1	17	15	Beltone	"Oh Yes, I Love You"	Tossin' & Turnin'
1961	"One Track Mind"	9	8	—	16	Beltone	"Are You Ready"	Tossin' & Turnin'
1961	"What a Walk"	77	—	—	—	Beltone	"Cry No More"	Tossin' & Turnin'
1962	"Mamie in the Afternoon"	110	—	—	—	Beltone	"Yes, Oh Yes, It Did"	
1962	"A Man's Gotta Be a Man"	—	—	—	—	Beltone	"Day by Day, I Need Your Love"	
1962	"I'm Tossin' and Turnin' Again"	98	—	—	—	Beltone	"Nothin' but the Blues"	
1962	"Lonely Teardrops"	—	—	—	—	Beltone	"Boom-a-Chick-Chick"	Tossin' & Turnin'
1964	"Fannie Tucker"	—	—	—	—	ABC-Paramount	"That's Right"	
1964	"Jealous Love"	—	—	—	—	ABC-Paramount	"Stark Raving Wild"	
1968	"Soul Seekin'"	—	—	—	—	Philips	"Give Me Your Yesterdays"	
