= Wonderland by Night =

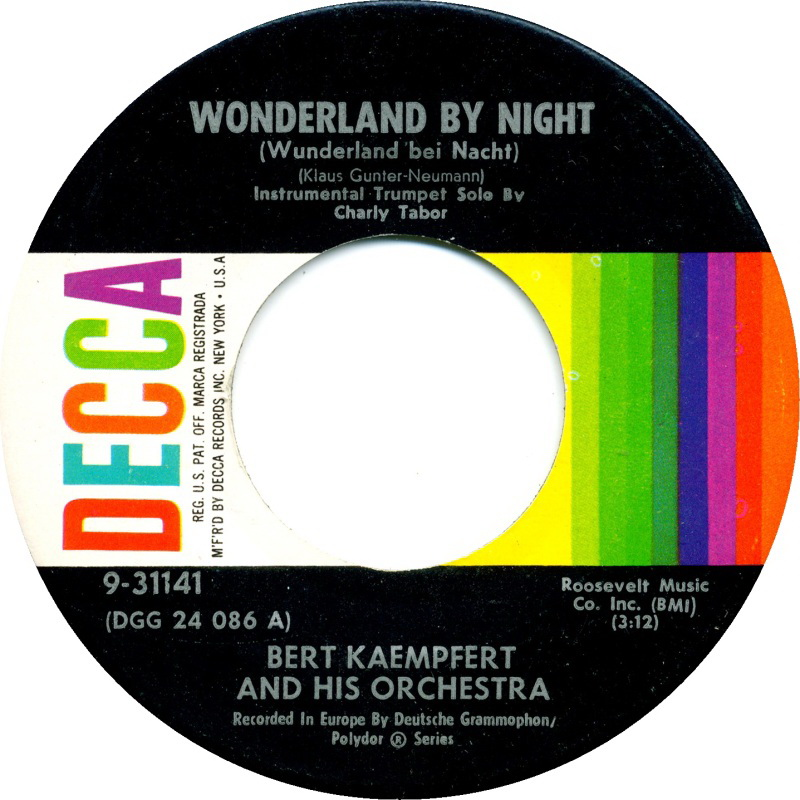
- Side A of the original US single

Single by Bert Kaempfert

from the album Wonderland by Night
- B-side: "Dreaming the Blues"
- Released: 22 August 1960
- Recorded: July 1959
- Studio: Studio Rahlstedt, Hamburg
- Genre: Jazz; R&B
- Length: 3:12
- Label: Decca
- Composer: Klaus Günter Neumann
- Lyricist: Lincoln Chase (English)

Bert Kaempfert singles chronology
"Wonderland by Night" (1960)	"Cerveza" (1961)

Audio
- "Wonderland by Night" on YouTube

"Wonderland by Night" (German title: "Wunderland bei Nacht") is a popular song by Bert Kaempfert that was a Billboard number one hit for three weeks, starting 9 January 1961. Written by Klaus Günter Neumann with English lyrics by Lincoln Chase, it was recorded in July 1959 and became Bert Kaempfert's first hit with his orchestra. The song featured Charly Tabor on trumpet. "Wonderland by Night" also crossed over to the R&B chart where it peaked at number five.

== Chart history ==
Chart (1960–1961)	Peak position
Australia (Kent Music Report)	1
Canada (CHUM)	1
New Zealand (Lever Hit Parade)	1
U.S. Billboard Hot 100	1
U.S. Billboard Hot R&B Sides	5

== Notable cover versions ==
- Another cover, recorded and released by Louis Prima, also charted in the same year, reaching #15 on the Billboard charts.
- Anita Bryant's version, which included orchestrations by Lew Douglas, reached #18 on the US Pop Chart.

== In popular culture ==
A German-language numbers station (G10) was operated by one of Polish intelligence agencies and was active until the late 1970s, which used Kaempfert's version of the song, and its B-side, "Dreaming the Blues", both repeated twice in chronological order as its interval signal, followed by the average format of a numbers station, this interval signal leading it to be commonly nicknamed by Shortwave radio enthusiasts after Kaempfert. It was later replaced by G11 (nicknamed "Strich"), which was most recently active from 2007 to 2014.

== See also ==
- List of Billboard Hot 100 number-one singles of 1961
