= Calcutta (song) =

Single by Lawrence Welk

from the album Calcutta!
- B-side: "My Grandfather's Clock"
- Released: December 1960
- Genre: Easy listening
- Length: 2:13
- Label: Dot
- Songwriter: Heino Gaze
- Producer: Artie Ripp

Lawrence Welk singles chronology
"Last Date" (1960)	"Calcutta" (1960)	"Theme From My Three Sons" (1961)

"Calcutta" is a German pop song. The instrumental version by American bandleader and TV host Lawrence Welk on the 1961 Dot Records album Calcutta! was a number one song in the United States and the most successful hit of Welk's career.

== History ==
The tune was written in 1958 by the composer Heino Gaze. The original title was "Tivoli Melody", but it was re-titled several times, until it finally was named for the Indian city of Kolkata, known in German as Kalkutta and in English as Calcutta. The German version has lyrics by Hans Bradtke, and is titled "Kalkutta liegt am Ganges" (Calcutta lies on the Ganges). In the English-speaking world, the song was released under the title "Calcutta", and the American songwriting team of Paul Vance and Lee Pockriss wrote English lyrics, celebrating the charms of the "ladies of Calcutta."

Welk's recording of the tune was something of a departure for him. It incorporated his recognizable "trademarks," i.e., the harpsichord lead and an accordion but combined them with handclaps and a brisk rock rhythm.

"Calcutta" stayed atop the US pop chart for two weeks while the album, with its combination of easy listening tunes and covers of then-popular rock singles, charted at #1 for two weeks, spending three months on the chart. At the time "Calcutta" reached #1, Welk, who was 57, became the oldest artist to have a number one pop single in the U.S. (His record would be broken three years later by Louis Armstrong, who at age 62 topped the singles charts with "Hello, Dolly!" in May 1964, and in turn Brenda Lee, two days short of age 79, surpassed Armstrong with the 2023 re-release of "Rockin' Around the Christmas Tree".) "Calcutta" was also a hit on the Hot R&B Sides chart, where it peaked at #10. It proved to be the last top 40 hit of Welk's career.

Dancers Bobby Burgess and Barbara Boylan, cast members on Welk's weekly TV show, worked up a dance routine to go along with "Calcutta", which they performed numerous times on the Welk show over the years.

Apollo 10 1/2: A Space Age Childhood, a 2022 film, briefly used the song in the background of a scene.

== Certifications ==
Region	Certification	Certified units/sales
United States (RIAA)	Gold	1,000,000^{^}
^{^} Shipments figures based on certification alone.

== Charts ==
Chart (1960–61)	Peak position
Canada CHUM Chart	7
US Billboard Hot 100	1

== Cover versions ==
The Four Preps released a 45 rpm single vocal version shortly after Welk's recording in 1961, Capitol Records 4508. It briefly entered the Billboard Hot 100.

Al Caiola released a version on his 1961 album Golden Hit Instrumentals, UAS 6142.

The Ventures released a version on their 1963 Dolton album The Ventures Play Telstar and the Lonely Bull, BST 8019.

Les Baxter made a version of the song, which was featured in Volume 3: Space Capades on the 1960s CD compilation Ultra-Lounge.

There is also a vocal version by Marino Marini, and a French-language cover by Petula Clark, Ma Fête À Moi.

There are German versions by Vico Torriani, Die Travellers, and Rainhard Fendrich.

== See also ==
- List of Hot 100 number-one singles of 1961 (U.S.)
