= Len Barry =

American musical artist (1942–2020)

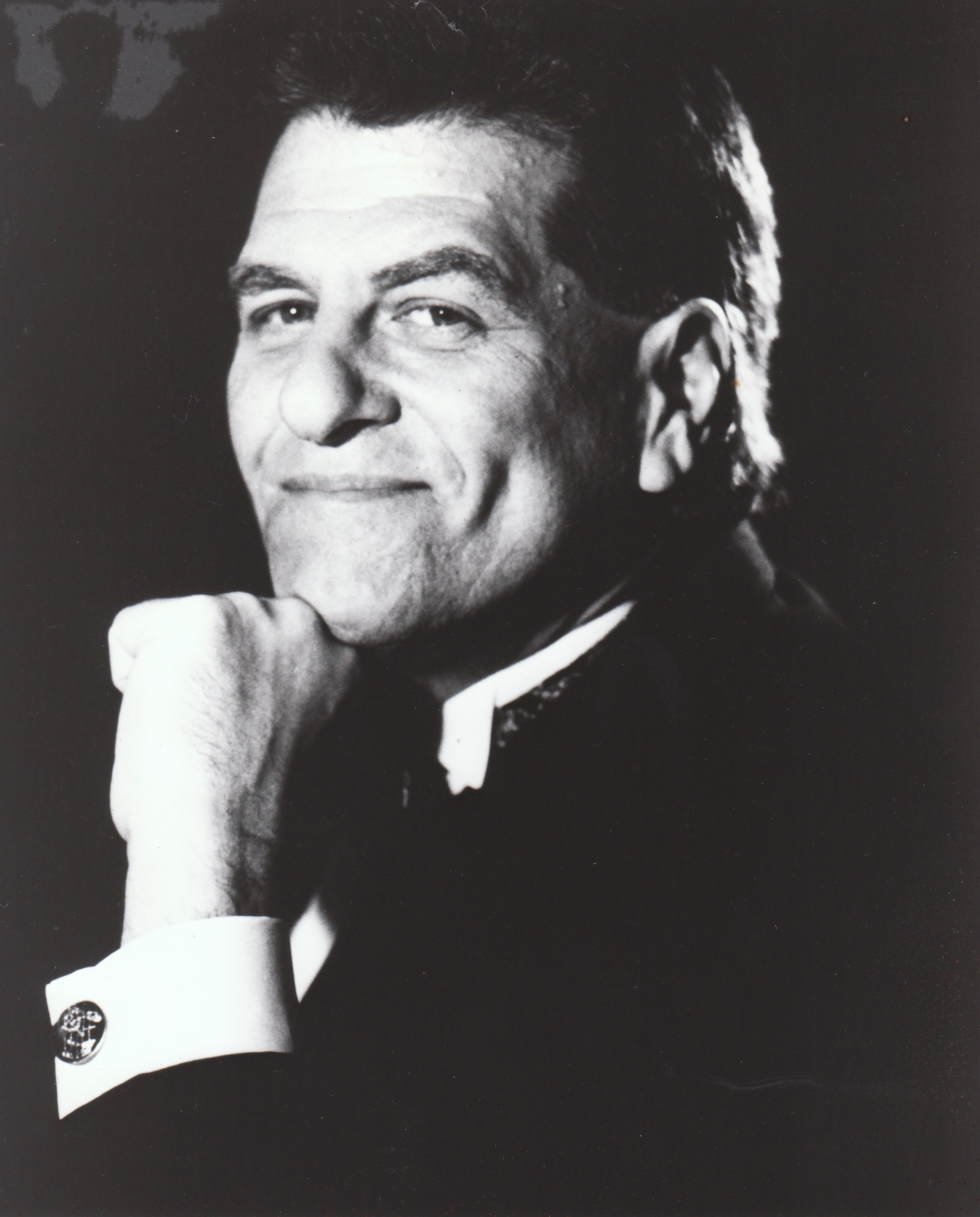
- Barry in 1990

Background information
- Born: Leonard Warren Borisoff; June 12, 1942; Philadelphia, Pennsylvania, U.S.
- Died: November 5, 2020 (aged 78) Philadelphia, Pennsylvania, U.S.
- Genres: Blue-eyed soul
- Occupations: Musician; songwriter; record producer
- Instrument: Vocals
- Years active: 1958–2020
- Labels: Cameo-Parkway; Brunswick; RCA; Decca

Leonard Warren Borisoff (June 12, 1942 – November 5, 2020), known professionally by the stage name Len Barry, was an American singer, songwriter, lyricist, record producer, author, and poet.

== Life and career ==
Born on June 12, 1942, and raised in Philadelphia, Barry had little thought of a show business career while still in school. Instead, he aspired to become a professional basketball player upon his graduation. It was not until he entered military service and had occasion to sing with the US Coast Guard band at Cape May, New Jersey, and was so encouraged by the response of his military audiences, that he decided to make music a career.

Upon his discharge from military service, Barry returned home to Philadelphia and formed the Dovells. Barry was the lead singer, appearing on all of the group's best-selling records, such as "Bristol Stomp", "Hully Gully Baby", and "You Can't Sit Down", among others. "Bristol Stomp" sold over one million copies and was awarded a RIAA gold disc. As a Dovell, he also toured with James Brown. Barry also made film appearances with the Dovells in films such as Don't Knock the Twist and toured the UK with the Motown Revue. Barry also had guest appearances on US television on Bandstand and later American Bandstand, Shindig, and Hullabaloo. Soon after leaving the group, Barry recorded his first solo single, "Lip Sync".

As someone who sang rhythm and blues, he recorded hits in 1965 and 1966 for Decca Records in the US and released by Brunswick Records: "1-2-3", "Like a Baby", and "I Struck It Rich", a song he wrote with Leon Huff of the Philadelphia International Records producers, Gamble and Huff.

His first two hits also made the Top Ten of the UK Singles Chart. "1-2-3" reached number three. Those songs also peaked at number 2 and 27 on the US Billboard Hot 100 chart respectively. "1-2-3" sold over four million copies, and gave Barry his second RIAA gold disc and a Grammy Award nomination for Contemporary Rock & Roll Male Vocal Performance. Both "1-2-3" and "Like a Baby" were composed by Barry, John Madara, and David White.

He performed at the Apollo Theatre in New York; the Howard Theatre in Washington, D.C.; The Regal Chicago, Chicago; Illinois; The Fox Theatre (Detroit) in Detroit, Michigan; and The Uptown (Philadelphia), Philadelphia, Pennsylvania. He also toured with Sam Cooke, The Motown Revue in the United Kingdom, and appeared on Top of the Pops.

He became a major singing star in the United Kingdom. Highlights of his European tour included featured performances at the London Palladium and Royal Albert Hall as well as numerous appearances throughout England, Ireland, Scotland and Wales.

Barry's respect for the Native American culture led him to write and produce the instrumental "Keem-O-Sabe". The song went to number 16 on the Billboard Hot 100 in 1969 for The Electric Indian.

He also did writing and production work with WMOT Productions. With Bobby Eli he helped write the hit singles "Zoom" for Fat Larry's Band and "Love Town" for Booker Newberry III.

In May 2008, Barry reinvented himself as an author with the publication of the novel, Black-Like-Me. The storyline involved a pair of Caucasian siblings growing up in a largely African-American neighborhood, accepted by some, rejected by others.

In 2011, Barry was featured in the PBS Series My Music: Rock, Pop & Doo Wop.

Len Barry died on November 5, 2020, at Nazareth Hospital in Philadelphia. The cause was myelodysplasia, or cancer of the bone marrow.

== Discography ==
=== Albums ===
- 1-2-3 (1965) - Decca Records (No. 90 on the Billboard Top LPs)
- My Kind of Soul (1967) - RCA Records
- Ups and Downs (1972) - Buddah Records
- More from the 123 Man (1982) - Bulldog

=== Singles ===
==== As lead singer with The Dovells ====
(See separate Wikipedia article for The Dovells for full discography)

Year	Single	Chart position	
Year	Single	US	AU
1961	"Bristol Stomp"	2	70
1962	"The New Continental"	37	—
1962	"Bristol Twisting Annie"	27	—
1962	"Hully Gully Baby"	25	—
1963	"You Can't Sit Down"	3	—

==== Solo singles discography ====
Year	Single (A-side, B-side) Both sides from same album except where indicated	Chart position				Album
Year	Single (A-side, B-side) Both sides from same album except where indicated	US	UK	AU	Can	Album
1964	"Don't Come Back" b/w "Jim Dandy"	-	-	-	-	Len Barry Sings with the Dovells
1964	"Hearts Are Trump" b/w "Little White House"; Original release on Cameo	-	-	-	-	Len Barry Sings with the Dovells
1964	"Let's Do It Again" b/w "Happy Days"	-	-	-	-	Non-album singles
1965	"Lip Sync" b/w "At the Hop '65"	84	-	-	-	1-2-3
1965	"1-2-3" b/w "Bullseye"	2	3	7	3	1-2-3
1966	"Like a Baby" b/w "Happiness (Is a Girl Like You)"	27	10	31	-	1-2-3
1966	"Hearts Are Trump" b/w "Little White House"; Second release on Parkway	-	-	-	-	Len Barry Sings with the Dovells
1966	"Somewhere" b/w "It's a Crying Shame"	26	-	52	28	Non-album singles
1966	"It's That Time of The Year" b/w "Happily Ever After"	91	-	82	84	Non-album singles
1966	"I Struck It Rich" b/w "Love Is"	98	55 (Note: Chart position is from the official UK "Breakers List".)	-	-	Non-album singles
1966	"You Baby" b/w "Would I Love You"	-	-	-	-	1-2-3
1967	"The Moving Finger Writes" b/w "Our Love"	124	-	-	-	My Kind of Soul
1967	"All Those Memories" b/w "Rainy Side of the Street" (from My Kind of Soul)	-	-	-	-	Non-album singles
1967	"Come Rain or Shine" b/w "The ABC'S of Love"	-	-	-	-	Non-album singles
1968	"Sweet and Funky" b/w "I Like the Way"	-	-	-	-	Non-album singles
1968	"456 (Now I'm Alone)" b/w "Funky Night"	-	-	-	-	Non-album singles
1968	"Christopher Columbus" b/w "You're My Picasso Baby"	-	-	-	-	Non-album singles
1968	"A Child Is Born" b/w "Wouldn't It Be Beautiful"	-	-	-	-	Non-album singles
1969	"Put Out the Fire" b/w "Spread It On Like Butter"	-	-	-	-	Non-album singles
1969	"Keem-O-Sabe" b/w "This Old World"	-	-	-	-	Non-album singles
1970	"Bob and Carol and Ted and Alice" b/w "In My Present State of Mind"	-	-	-	-	Non-album singles
1972	"Diggin' Life" b/w "Just the Two of Us"	-	-	-	-	Ups and Downs
1972	"1-2-3" b/w "You Baby"; Chart reentry in UK	-	52	-	-	1-2-3
1973	"Heaven + Earth" b/w "I'm Marching to the Music"	-	-	-	-	Non-album singles
2006	"I'm in Love" b/w "Love Love Love"	-	-	-		Non-album singles

Len Barry recorded "I'm Marching to the Music (You've Been Playing in My Mind)" as a non-album single on the other side of “Heaven and Earth” in 1973. The writers of the song were Billy Meshel, Chris Welch and Gene Belletiere. This is the same song Bobby Sherman released on November 10, 1971 with the title, "Marching to the Music". Bobby Sherman sang "Marching to the Music" on the Sonny & Cher Comedy Hour show that first aired on the September 29, 1972 (season 3, episode 22).

== See also ==
- List of artists under the Decca Records label
- List of people from Philadelphia
- List of performers on Top of the Pops
