= The Marcels =

American doo-wop group

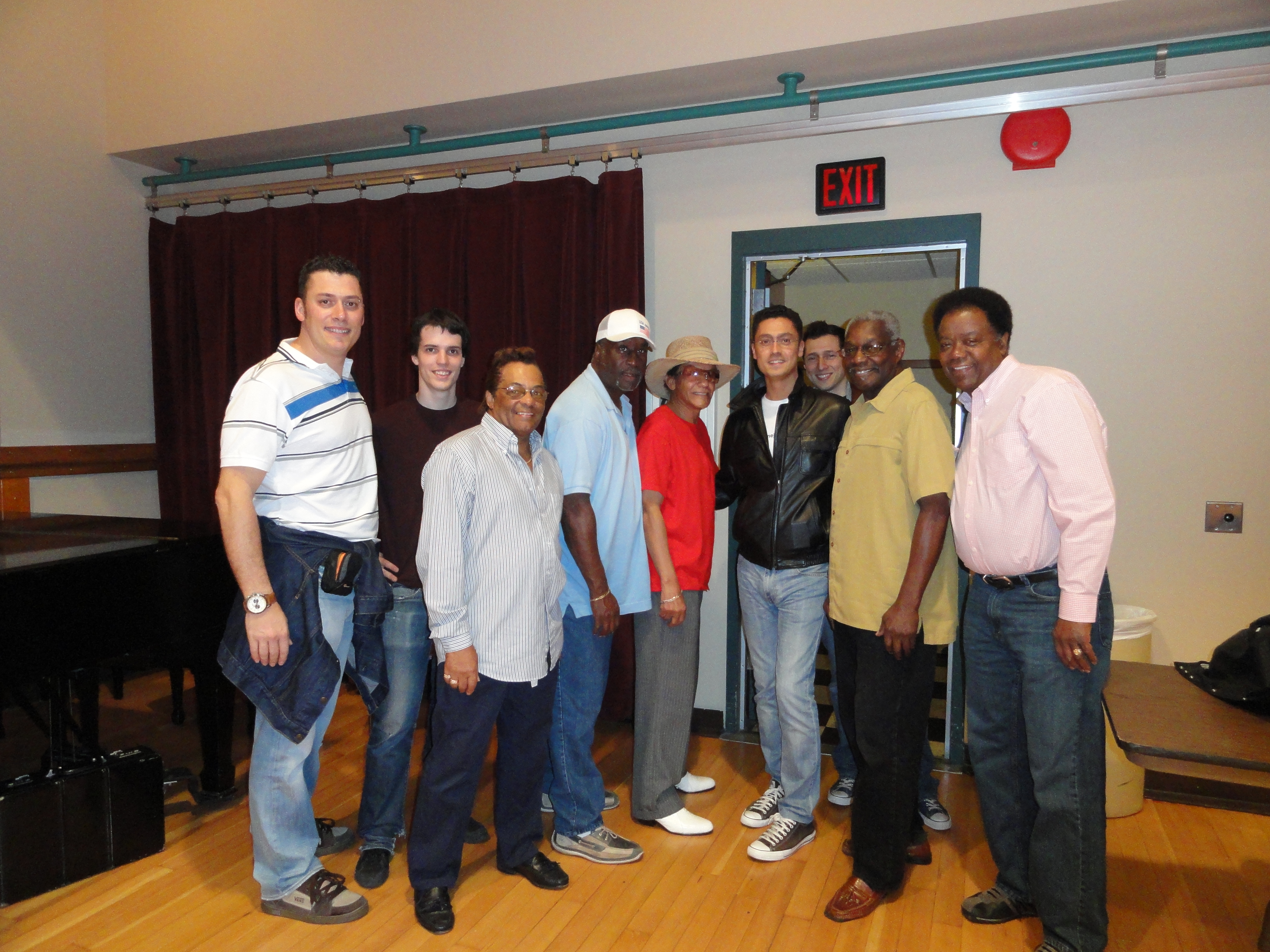
- The Marcels with the Earth Angels, during their participation in the festival carried out at the Benedum Center during May 2010 in Pittsburgh, Pennsylvania

Background information
- Origin: Pittsburgh, Pennsylvania, U.S.
- Genres: Doo-wop
- Years active: 1959–1962, 1972, 1990s–2010s
- Past members: Richard Knauss; Cornelius Harp; Fred Johnson; Gene Bricker; Ron Mundy; Daniel Mercado; Allen Johnson; Walt Maddox; Richard Harris; William Herndon; Jules Hopson; Richard Merritt; Chuck Townsend

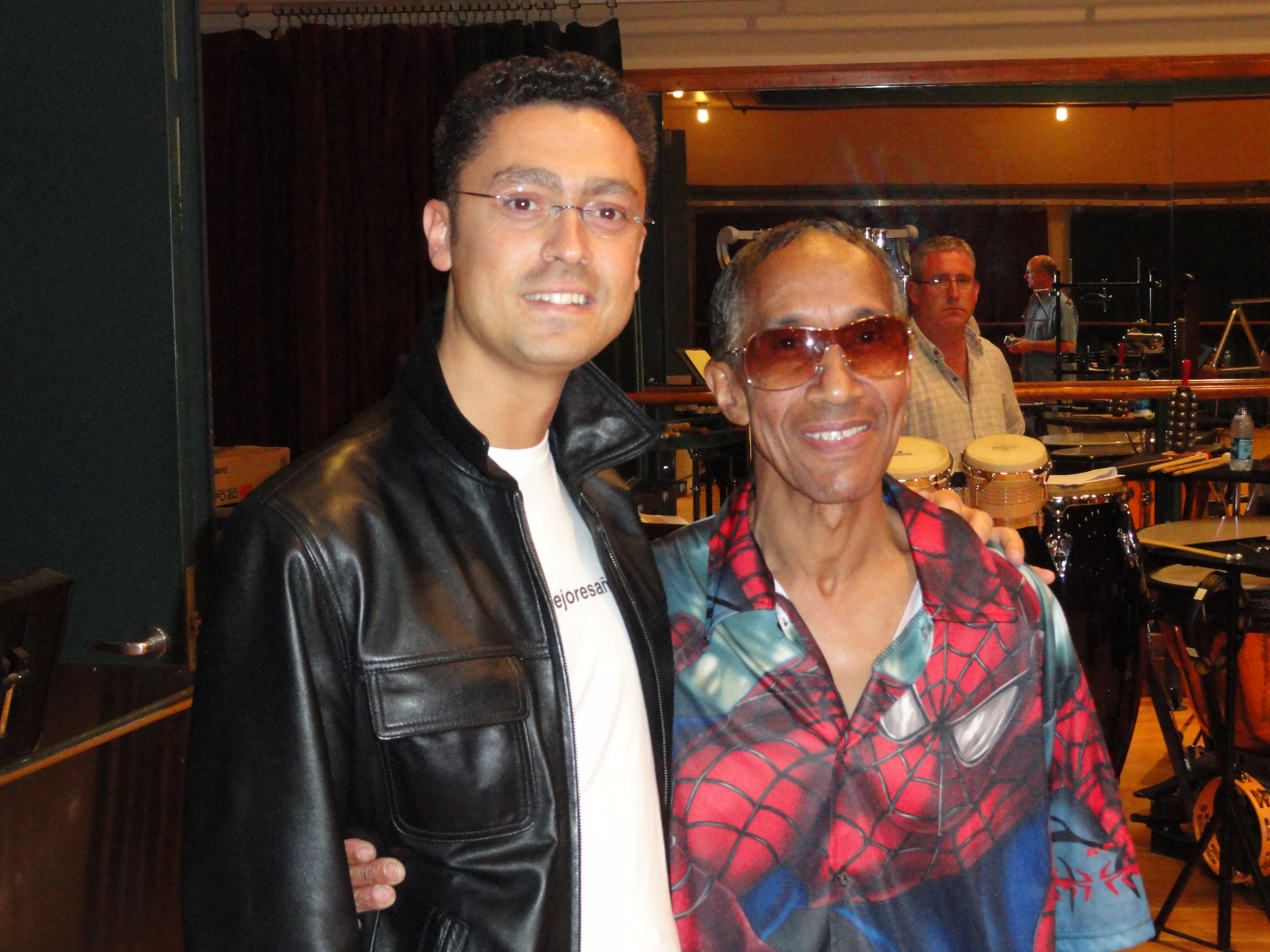
Fred Johnson (right), with Christian Carrasco from the Earth Angels

The Marcels were an American doo-wop group known for turning popular music songs into rock and roll. The group formed in 1959 in Pittsburgh, Pennsylvania and signed to Colpix Records with lead Cornelius Harp, bass Fred Johnson, Gene Bricker, Ron Mundy, and Richard Knauss. The group was named after a popular hair style of the day, the marcel wave, by Fred Johnson's younger sister Priscilla.

== Career ==
In 1961, the Marcels released a doo-wop cover of the ballad "Blue Moon" that began with the bass singer singing, "bomp-baba-bomp-ba-bomp-ba-bomp-bomp... vedanga-dang-dang-vadinga-dong-ding...". The record sold over one million copies and was awarded a gold disc. It is featured in the Rock and Roll Hall of Fame's 500 Songs that Shaped Rock and Roll.

The disc went to number one in the U.S. Billboard Hot 100 and UK Singles Chart. In the US, additional revivals in the same vein as "Blue Moon"—"Heartaches" and "My Melancholy Baby"—were less successful, although "Heartaches" peaked at No. 7 on the Billboard Hot 100 and eventually sold over one million copies worldwide.

The introduction to "Blue Moon" was an excerpt of an original song that the group had in its act, a cover of "Zoom" by the Cadillacs. Colpix A&R director Stu Phillips transferred the introduction to "Blue Moon" to give the song additional flair. The Marcels recorded "Blue Moon" in two takes. A promotion man asked for and got a copy of the finished tape, which found its way to DJ Murray the K. He promoted it as an "exclusive" and reportedly played it 26 times on one show.

In August 1961, due to racial problems encountered while touring in the Deep South because of the group being multi-racial, Knauss and Bricker and Daniel Mercado left and were replaced by Allen Johnson (brother of Fred) and Walt Maddox and Mundy. In 1962, Harp and Allen Johnson left and were replaced by Richard Harris and William Herndon. There was a brief reunion of the original members in 1973. The group made several recordings in 1975 with Harp back on lead. Original member Gene Bricker died on December 10, 1983. Allen Johnson died of cancer on September 28, 1995, at age 55. By the early 1990s, the group included Johnson, Maddox, Harris, Jules Hopson, and Richard Merritt. The group split around 1995. Fred Johnson formed his own group with new members, while the other four members recruited new bassist Ted Smith. Maddox won a lawsuit against Sunny James Cvetnic, the manager of Johnson's group, for trademark infringement in 1996. Johnson reunited with Harp, Mundy and Knauss in 1999 for the PBS special Doo Wop 50.

The Marcels were inducted into the Vocal Group Hall of Fame in 2002.

Original lead singer Cornelius "Nini" Harp (born on 14 September 1939) died on June 4, 2013, at the age of 73.

Ronald "Bingo" Mundy (born on April 20, 1940) died of pneumonia on January 20, 2017, at the age of 76.

Fred Johnson (born on 11 March 1942) died March 31, 2022, at the age of 80. Walt Maddox (born in 1937/38) died on March 30, 2026, at the age of 88.

== Discography ==
=== Albums ===
Title	Album details
Blue Moon	Released: July 1961; Label: Colpix

=== Singles ===
Title	Year	Peak chart positions										
Title	Year	US	US R&B	AUS	BEL (FL)	BEL (WA)	CAN	GER	NL	NOR	NZ	UK
"Blue Moon" b/w "Goodbye to Love"	1961	1	1	4	4	5	1	13	6	4	1	1
"Summertime" b/w "Teeter-Totter Love"	1961	78	—	—	—	—	—	—	—	—	—	46
"You Are My Sunshine" b/w "Find Another Fool"	1961	—	—	—	—	—	—	—	—	—	—	—
"Heartaches" b/w "My Love for You"	1961	7	19	67	—	—	22	—	—	—	—	—
"Merry Twist-Mas" b/w "Don't Cry for Me This Christmas"	1961	—	—	—	—	—	—	—	—	—	—	—
"My Melancholy Baby" b/w "Really Need Your Love"	1962	58	—	—	—	—	—	—	—	—	—	—
"Twistin' Fever" b/w "Footprints in the Sand"	1962	103	—	—	—	—	—	—	—	—	—	—
"Hold On" b/w "Flowerpot"	1962	—	—	—	—	—	—	—	—	—	—	—
"Friendly Loans" b/w "Loved Her the Whole Week Through"	1962	—	—	—	—	—	—	—	—	—	—	—
"Lollipop Baby" b/w "Allright, Okay, You Win"	1962	—	—	—	—	—	—	—	—	—	—	—
"Don't Turn Your Back on Me" b/w "That Old Black Magic"	1963	—	—	—	—	—	—	—	—	—	—	—
"I Wanna Be the Leader" b/w "Give Me Back Your Love"	1963	—	—	—	—	—	—	—	—	—	—	—
"One Last Kiss" b/w "Teeter Totter Love"	1963	—	—	—	—	—	—	—	—	—	—	—
"Your Red Wagon ("You Can Push It, or Pull It")" b/w "Comes Love"	1964	—	—	—	—	—	—	—	—	—	—	—
"How Deep Is the Ocean" b/w "Lonely Boy"	1964	—	—	—	—	—	—	—	—	—	—	—
"In the Still of the Night" b/w "High on a Hill"	1973	—	—	—	—	—	—	—	—	—	—	—
"A Fallen Tear" b/w "I'll Be Forever Loving You"	1975	—	—	—	—	—	—	—	—	—	—	—
"Sweet Was the Wine" b/w "Over the Rainbow"	1975	—	—	—	—	—	—	—	—	—	—	—
"Most of All" b/w "Just Two People in the World"	1975	—	—	—	—	—	—	—	—	—	—	—
"Letter Full of Tears" (as Walt Maddox and the Marcels) b/w "How Do You Speak to an Angel"	1982	—	—	—	—	—	—	—	—	—	—	—
"Blue Moon" (as Walt Maddox and the Marcels) b/w "Clap Your Hands (When I Clap My Hands)"	1982	—	—	—	—	—	—	—	—	—	—	—
"—" denotes releases that did not chart or were not released in that territory.

== Chart performance ==
"Blue Moon"

- No.1 U.S.
- No.1 U.K.
- No.1 Australia
- No.1 Ger/Fra
- No.1 N.Z.

"Summertime"

- No.78 U.S.
- No.38 Australia
- No.12 N.Z.

"Heartaches"

- No.7 U.S.
- No.3 U.K.
- No.15 Australia

"My Melancholy Baby"

- No.30 U.K.
- No.7 Australia

"Flowerpot"

- No.10 N.Z.

"Friendly Loans"

- No.75 U.S.
- No.31 Australia

"Teeter-Totter Love" (1963 version)

- No.2 Australia (The song was well received in the city of Adelaide where it reached No.2 in August 1963)

== Filmography ==
- Twist Around the Clock (1961)

The Marcels' popularity in 1961 was so great that they were included in the Oscar Rudolph film Twist Around the Clock. Released on December 30, 1961, with the tagline "It's Twist-eriffic! The first full-length movie about the Twist!" the film also showcased fellow artists Chubby Checker, Dion DiMucci, Vicki Spencer and singer-songwriter and TV show host turned actor Clay Cole. Allen Johnson, Gene Bricker, Cornelius Harp, Fred Johnson, Richard Knauss and Ronald Mundy of The Marcels were all included—and had speaking parts in addition to performing musical numbers. They sing "Merry Twist-Mas", which was released over Christmas 1961, though no chart action ensued.

- Bikini Beach (1964)

This Annette Funicello and Frankie Avalon movie, about a millionaire who sets out to prove his theory that his pet chimpanzee is as intelligent as the teenagers who hang out on the local beach where he is intending to build a retirement home but ends in hilarious results, also included two of The Marcels, Gene Bricker and Cornelius Harp. They provided backing vocals for two songs, Avalon's "Gimme Your Love Yeah Yeah Yeah" and Little Stevie Wonder's "(Happy Feelin') Dance And Shout".
