= The Clay Cole Show =

- Cole (left) with the Isley Brothers in 1962
- Also known as: Rate the Records; Talent Teens; Teen Quiz; The Record Wagon; Clay Cole's Discotek

Original release
- Network: WNTA-TV; WPIX-TV
- Release: September 1959 – December 16, 1967

The Clay Cole Show is an American rock music television show based in New York City, hosted by Clay Cole from 1959 to 1967.

== History ==
First broadcast on WNTA-TV (now WNET) in September 1959 as Rate the Records, within two months the format was changed, and an hour-long Saturday-night show was added. In the summer months, the show was expanded to an hour, six nights a week, live from New Jersey's Palisades Amusement Park, where Chubby Checker first performed and danced "The Twist". In 1963, the show moved to WPIX-TV, where for five years it was successful, thanks to first-time guest appearances of the Rolling Stones (on a program with one other guest act – the Beatles), Neil Diamond, Dionne Warwick, Simon & Garfunkel, Richie Havens, Tony Orlando, Blood, Sweat & Tears and the Rascals. On the WPIX version's first few months, it was titled Clay Cole at the Moon Bowl and was taped at the Bronx-based amusement park Freedomland U.S.A. For the first WPIX edition, his guests were Lionel Hampton, Bobby Darin, and Joey Dee and the Starlighters.

In 1965 the show was renamed Clay Cole's Discotek. Clay produced a full hour with just one guest, Tony Bennett. Clay's all-star, ten-day Christmas Show in 1960 at the Brooklyn Paramount Theater holds the all-time box-office record for that theater.

Cole was the first to introduce stand-up comics such as Richard Pryor, George Carlin and Fannie Flagg to a teen audience. He was the first to produce a full hour of all-black performers, his historic Salute to Motown. Unlike other teen music show hosts, Cole danced to the music he played on his shows; he was also unafraid to book lesser-known performers.

In December 1967, at the height of his show's popularity, Cole left the show and moved to then-NBC-owned-and-operated station WKYC in Cleveland. He was reportedly unhappy with the shift in pop music to psychedelic acid rock and heavy metal. The final edition of his program in New York aired on December 16, 1967. He hosted the first half hour, featuring live guests Paul Anka and Bobby Vee and a film performance from the Beatles. In the second half hour, he introduced the host that replaced him on WPIX: Canadian singer Peter Martin.

His memoir of the early years of rock and roll and live television, Sh-Boom! The Explosion of Rock 'n' Roll (1953-1968) has been published by Morgan James. Cole died on December 18, 2010.
