= Don't Knock the Twist =

1962 film by Oscar Rudolph

- Directed by: Oscar Rudolph
- Screenplay by: Robert E. Kent
- Produced by: Sam Katzman
- Starring: Lang Jeffries; Chubby Checker; Gene Chandler; Vic Dana
- Cinematography: Gordon Avil
- Edited by: Jerome Thoms
- Music by: Freddy Karger
- Production company: Four-Leaf Productions
- Distributed by: Columbia Pictures
- Release date: April 13, 1962
- Running time: 89 minutes
- Country: United States
- Language: English

Don't Knock The Twist Original Sound Track Recording

Soundtrack album by Chubby Checker The Carroll Brothers The Dovells Dee Dee Sharp
- Released: 1962
- Genre: Pop rock
- Label: Parkway

Professional ratings
Review scores
Source	Rating
New Record Mirror	4/5 stars

Don't Knock the Twist is a 1962 American comedy musical film directed by Oscar Rudolph and starring Lang Jeffries. It was written by Robert E. Kent and produced by Sam Katzman for release by Columbia Pictures. It is a sequel to Rudolph's 1961 film Twist Around the Clock, and features musical artists including Chubby Checker, Gene Chandler, and The Dovells.

== Plot summary ==
A large group of twist dancers meet in preparation for a television variety show called The Twist. While the program is still in its production stages, jealousy leads to problems.

== Cast ==
- Chubby Checker as himself
- Gene Chandler as the Duke of Earl
- Vic Dana as himself
- Linda Scott as herself
- The Dovells (Len Barry, Mike Dennis, Arnie Satin, Jerry Summers) as themselves
- The Carroll Brothers as themselves
- Lang Jeffries as Ted Haver
- Mari Blanchard as Dulcie Corbin
- Georgine Darcy as Madge Albright
- Stephen Preston as Billy Albright
- James Chandler as Joe Albright

== Music ==
=== Live performances in the film ===
1. "Don't Knock the Twist" – Chubby Checker
2. "Duke of Earl" – Gene Chandler
3. "Slow Twistin'" – Chubby Checker & Dee Dee Sharp
4. "Yessiree" – Linda Scott
5. "Little Altar Boy" – Vic Dana
6. "The Fly" – Chubby Checker
7. "Do the New Continental" – The Dovells
8. "Hey! Bo Diddley" – The Carroll Brothers
9. "Mashed Potato Time" – Dee Dee Sharp
10. "Bristol Stomp" – The Dovells

=== Soundtrack ===
1. "Twistin'" (Mann-Appell) 2:08
2. "Bristol Stomp" (Mann-Appell) 2:18
3. "La Paloma Twist" (Kal Mann) 2:32
4. "Mashed Potato Time" (Sheldon-Land) 2:27
5. "Bo Diddley" (Bo Diddley) 3:05 (misspelled "Diddely" on cover and label)
6. "I Love to Twist" (Mann-Lowe) 2:40
7. "Don't Knock the Twist" (Mann-Appell) 2:17
8. "Salome Twist" (Karger-Kent) 1:38
9. "The Fly" (John Madara/David White) 2:27
10. "Smashed Potatoes" (Sheldon-Leon) 2:27
11. "Slow Twistin'" (Jon Sheldon) 2:31

== Critical reception ==
The Monthly Film Bulletin wrote: "Shoddy and vulgar effort to mine what must surely be the last tiny nugget of box office gold out of the Twist. The plot doesn't bear thinking about, and the quality of the acts can be gauged by the fact that, in comparison, Chubby Checker seems a positively scintillating musical talent."

Variety wrote: "If at first you don't succeed, try, try again. That appears to be the rational method of producer Sam Katzman, filmdom's fastest man with a fad. Having parlayed the rock 'n' roll into two enterprising filmic ventures several years back when r-and-r was the rage, Katzman has now duplicated the opportunistic two-play feat for Columbia with their sequel to his successful Twist Around the Clock. Don't Knock the Twist may not be the definitive work in the Twist prism, in fact it may be to the cinema what St. Vitus Dance is to terpsichore. ... James B. Gordon's screenplay is appropriately skippy, being mostly a linking secondary issue, Oscar Rudolph's direction is adequate under the helter-skelier circumstances. Hal Belfer's choreography is twistably sound and hip in individual cases, but the ensemble dance-floor gyrations seem a bit disorganized and amateurish."

For Turner Classic Movies, critic John M. Miller wrote that "No matter how trite or inconsequential the plot, every Katzman-produced exploitation musical is invaluable for capturing obscure recording artists of the era in their prime," noting that the "slick pop numbers [of Dana and Scott] serve as a reminder that many of the chart toppers of the period were soon forgotten," and that the film "is also one of those Rock movies that emphasize the importance of adults' acceptance of their kids' fads and tastes."

A review of the film in TV Guide reported that it features "a silly story about preparations for a TV special on the twist and efforts to help a summer camp for orphans; in other words, a way to segue between a dozen musical numbers of varying quality."
