= The Electric Indian =

The Electric Indian was a studio group assembled and produced by The Dovells lead singer Len Barry which included Daryl Hall of Hall & Oates fame. Barry had an interest in Native American history, possibly inspired by watching The Lone Ranger TV series as a child. Their best-known song was "Keem-O-Sabe" which charted in 1969.

== Overview ==
"Keem-O-Sabe" was titled after the word (defined as faithful friend or trusty scout) that The Lone Ranger and his friend Tonto used to refer to each other. The song was released first on the small Marmaduke Inc. label where it gained regional airplay around Philadelphia. It was soon picked up for national release on the United Artists label in 1969 and reached U.S. number 16 in the Billboard Hot 100. It also made No. 6 on Billboard's Easy Listening survey, and crossed to the R&B chart. In Canada, the song reached No. 19 on the RPM Magazine top singles charts.

"Keem-O-Sabe" was credited to Barry's mother, Bernice Borisoff, and Swan Records owner Bernie Binnick. The tune is built around an old instrumental riff often used in old western movies when Indians were approaching, and includes hints of The Lone Ranger theme, the "William Tell Overture" by Gioachino Rossini.

An album of similar material was recorded, and the follow-up, an Indian style cover version of "Land of a Thousand Dances," (No. 95, 1969) charted. The album itself reached No. 104 on the Billboard Top LPs. No future releases were forthcoming. Many of the tracks on the LP were engineered by Joseph Tarsia and recorded at his Philadelphia-based Sigma Sound Studios, with many of the musicians later becoming members of the studio's notable in-house group, MFSB which had the 1974 hit song "T.S.O.P."
