= Leonard Stone =

American actor (1923–2011)

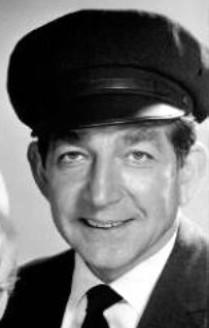
- Leonard Stone in 1967
- Born: Leonard Steinbock; November 3, 1923; Salem, Oregon, U.S.
- Died: November 2, 2011 (aged 87); Encinitas, California, U.S.
- Education: Willamette University
- Occupation: Actor
- Years active: 1956–2006
- Spouse: Carole H. Kleinman (m. 1964)
- Children: 4
- Awards: Tony Award – Best Supporting Actor

Leonard Stone (né Steinbock; November 3, 1923 – November 2, 2011) was an American character actor who played supporting roles in over 120 television shows and 35 films.

== Early life ==
Stone was born in Salem, Oregon, the son of Jewish parents Julia Marguerite (née Easton) and Albert Michael Steinbock.

He was a graduate of Salem High School. He majored in speech and drama at Willamette University, graduating cum laude.

== Military service ==
He was a midshipman during training with the U.S. Navy, going on to serve as "skipper on a minesweeper in Japanese waters" during World War II.

== Stage ==
Stone started his career as a young actor studying at the Royal Academy of Dramatic Art in London He performed in the West End, on Broadway, and toured the world. He traveled for eight years in Australia and New Zealand with the musical South Pacific.

In 1959, he won the Tony Award for Best Supporting Actor in Redhead, a Bob Fosse musical. He also was in the Tony Award-nominated cast of Look Homeward, Angel in 1957, which premiered at the Ethel Barrymore Theater in New York. The play, based on the Thomas Wolfe novel, won the Pulitzer Prize.

== Film and television ==
One of Stone's more notable film roles came in 1971, when he played Mr. Beauregarde, the father of Golden Ticket winner Violet Beauregarde (played by Denise Nickerson), in Willy Wonka & the Chocolate Factory. He was the last surviving adult character who toured the factory in the movie, but Diana Sowle, who played Mrs. Bucket, was still alive at the time of his death. In 1973's Soylent Green, he played Charles, the manager of the building where the murdered character portrayed by Joseph Cotten lived.

In 1956, Stone appeared in a minor role as a crew member on the RMS Titanic in a TV adaptation of Walter Lord's book A Night to Remember.

He was the bartender in The Shakiest Gun in the West (1968), and a congressman in The Man (1972), which starred James Earl Jones as the first Black president of the United States. He appeared in the Jerry Lewis vehicle The Big Mouth in 1967. Other films he appeared in include The Mugger (1958), A Man Called Dagger (1968), Angel in My Pocket (1969), Zig Zag (1970), Getting Straight (1970), I Love My Wife (1970), Mame (1974), and The Man from Independence (1974).

Stone appeared in the TV movies The Ghost of Sierra de Cobre (1964), A Step Out of Line (1971), Terror in the Sky (1971), Beg, Borrow or Steal (1973), The Runaways (1975), The Girl in the Empty Grave (1977), The Other Side of Hell (1978), Zuma Beach (1978), See Arnold Run (2005), and Surrender, Dorothy (2005).

Between 1961 and 1985, Stone appeared in dozens of popular American television series, including Peter Gunn, The Untouchables, Gunsmoke (five times), The Rifleman (twice), The Defenders, The Real McCoys (twice), The Outer Limits, Dr. Kildare (twice), McHale's Navy, Rawhide (twice), The F.B.I., The Doris Day Show, The High Chaparral, Lost in Space (twice), Gomer Pyle - U.S.M.C. (twice), Dragnet (five times), The Partridge Family, Nanny and the Professor, The Mod Squad, The Virginian, Love, American Style (twice), The Waltons, Mission: Impossible (three times), Adam-12, Barney Miller (five times), Hawaii Five-O, Ironside (three times), Kojak, Mannix (four times), Police Story (twice), Cannon, The Blue Knight, The Bob Newhart Show, Sanford and Son (twice), M*A*S*H, Eight Is Enough, The Six Million Dollar Man, All in the Family, The Dukes of Hazzard, General Hospital, One Day at a Time, Quincy, M.E. (four times), Cagney & Lacey, Alice (four times), Night Court, Hill Street Blues (twice), Falcon Crest (three times), Simon & Simon, and L.A. Law (10 times).

In 1961 and 1962, Stone was cast twice in different roles on The Real McCoys in the episodes "Money from Heaven" and "You Can't Beat the Army". Between 1962 and 1966, Stone made four guest appearances on Perry Mason, including his season-six, 1962 role as murderer Jerel Leland in "The Case of the Hateful Hero".

Stone played Farnum the Great in two episodes of Lost in Space (1965–1968).. He appeared twice on The Donna Reed Show, as Mr. Trestle in "The Good Guys and the Bad Guys" (1961) and as Harlan Carmody Jr., in "Joe College" (1965). In the 1965–1966 season, he appeared as Doc Joslyn on Camp Runamuck. In 1967, he had the role of Judge Gilroy in Cimarron Strip. In 1971, Stone appeared as Tom Wagner on The Men from Shiloh (rebranded name for The Virginian) in the episode titled "The Town Killer".

Between 1988 and 1994, he was cast as Judge Paul Hansen in 10 episodes of L.A. Law.

On September 22, 2000, he appeared on an episode of Wheel of Fortune.

Stone's final role came in 2006 at the age of 83, when he played a minor character in the TV movie Surrender Dorothy.

== Personal life and death ==
Stone married Carole H. Kleinman in 1964 and they had four children. He died on November 2, 2011, in Encinitas, California, just one day before his 88th birthday, after suffering a brief bout with cancer.

== Filmography ==
=== Select film ===
- The Mugger (1958) as Jim Kelly
- Return to Peyton Place (1961) as Steve Swanson (uncredited)
- Toys in the Attic (1963) as Hotel Clerk (uncredited)
- Shock Treatment (1964) as Psychiatrist (uncredited)
- The Big Mouth (1967) as Fong
- A Man Called Dagger (1968) as Karl Rainer
- The Shakiest Gun in the West (1968) as Bartender (uncredited)
- Angel in My Pocket (1969) as Paul Gresham
- Zig Zag (1970) as Jim Harris
- Getting Straight (1970) as Lysander
- I Love My Wife (1970) as Dr. Neilson
- Willy Wonka & the Chocolate Factory (1971) as Sam Beauregarde
- Terror in the Sky (1971) as Harry Burdick
- The Man (1972) as Congressman Parmel
- Soylent Green (1973) as Charles
- Mame (1974) as Stage Manager
- The Man from Independence (1974) as Werner
- Hardly Working (1980) as Ted Mitchell
- American Pop (1981) as Leo Stern (voice)
- Nankyoku Monogatari (1983) as Narrator
- See Arnold Run (2005) as Warren Buffett
- Surrender, Dorothy (TV film, 2006) as Neighbor

=== Select television ===
- The Rifleman (1960–1962) as Gambler/K.C. Peters
- The Untouchables (1961) as Louis Manzak
- The Real McCoys (1961–1962) as Lieutenant/Captain Lewis
- Perry Mason (1962–1966) as Various Roles
- The Outer Limits (1963) as Dr. Phillip Gainer
- Dr. Kildare (1963–1964) as Fred Payson
- Gunsmoke (1963–1974) as Various Roles
- Rawhide (1964–1965) as Sorry Brownstead/Leroy Means
- Mission: Impossible (1966–1972) as Various Roles
- The F.B.I. (1967) as Harry Palmer
- The Virginian (1971) as Tom Wagner
- The Waltons (1972) as George Anderson
- Sanford and Son (1972–1976) as Otto/Mr. Grayson
- Hawaii Five-O (1973) as Herman Stein
- The Six Million Dollar Man (1974) as Lt. Tanner
- The Bob Newhart Show (1976) as Dr. Ned Podbillion
- M*A*S*H (1977) as Colonel Bidwell
- The Dukes of Hazzard (1980) as Greg
- Barney Miller (1981) as Mr. Lun
- General Hospital (1982) as Packy/Packie/Packey(sp)
- Falcon Crest (1983–1985) as Harrison Albright/Judge Carl Fuller
- L.A. Law (1988–1994) as Judge Paul Hansen
- Days of Our Lives (1990) as Judge Randolph
- Avatar: The Last Airbender (2005) as Canyon Guide (voice)
