= Vicki Spencer =

American singer-songwriter

Vicki Spencer (born 1945) is an American pop and rock singer.

Spencer is the daughter of dancer Lou Spencer (of the Dunhill Trio dance team). She appeared as a teenage ingénue singer in two 1961 teen-oriented movies, Teenage Millionaire (starring Jimmy Clanton) and Twist Around the Clock (featuring Clay Cole). In both films she played herself, and most of her on-screen time was spent singing. Her song "I Wait" from Teenage Millionaire was released as a single, as was "Too Many Boyfriends" from Twist Around The Clock. Spencer wrote both songs.

Spencer was later in pop and rock bands, some that included two of her brothers, Daniel Spencer and William Spencer. She was the singer for the Bubble Gum Machine (which included the Spencer brothers), who released an eponymous album on Senate Records in 1967. Wes Farrell produced the album and co-wrote some of the songs. Other bands Spencer toured and recorded with were the Rottin Kids (who appeared on The Tonight Show), the Fabulous Fakes, and Horatio.

Spencer is married to Harry Perlow. Her daughter Jamie Perlow is also a singer and musician.

== Discography ==
=== Albums ===
==== With the Bubble Gum Machine ====
- The Bubble Gum Machine (Senate (#21002), 1967)

=== Singles ===
==== Solo ====
- "I Wait" (Fraternity (#883), 1961) b/w “Hello Mr. Dream” (1961), from film Teenage Millionaire.
- "Too Many Boyfriends" (Brunswick (#55222), 1961) b/w “He’s So Sweet” (1961), from film Twist Around the Clock.

==== With the Bad Seeds ====
- "King Of The Soap Box" (Columbia (#4-43670), 1966)

==== With the Rottin Kids ====
- "Let's Stomp" (Mercury (#72558), 1966)
- "Yakety Yak" (Mercury, 1967?)

==== With the Fabulous Fakes ====
- "Mickey's Monkey" (Columbia (#4-44107), 1967)

==== With the Bubble Gum Machine ====
- "You Make Everything Right" (Senate (#45-2107), 1968)

==== With Horatio ====
- "Age (Where I Started Again)" (Event (#3304), 1969)
- "I Gotta Have You" (Event (#3306), 1969)
