= Call Me Mister (film) =

1951 film by Lloyd Bacon

- Betty Grable and Dan Dailey on a Call Me Mister lobby card.
- Directed by: Lloyd Bacon
- Written by: Albert E. Lewin; Burt Styler
- Based on: Call Me Mister; 1946 musical by Harold Rome; Arnold M. Auerbach
- Produced by: Fred Kohlmar
- Starring: Betty Grable; Dan Dailey
- Cinematography: Arthur E. Arling
- Edited by: Louis R. Loeffler
- Music by: Leigh Harline
- Distributed by: Twentieth Century-Fox
- Release date: January 31, 1951 (New York)
- Running time: 96 minutes
- Language: English
- Box office: $2,175,000 (US rentals)

Call Me Mister is a 1951 American Technicolor musical film directed by Lloyd Bacon and starring Betty Grable, Dan Dailey, Danny Thomas, Dale Robertson, Benay Venuta and Richard Boone. The film is based on the 1946 Broadway stage play by Albert E. Lewin and Burt Styler. with music by Harold Rome that featured cast members from the American armed forces. However, only three of Rome's numbers are heard in the film.

== Plot ==
In the aftermath of World War II, American soldiers stationed in occupied Japan desire entertainment. They are treated to a show organized by Sergeant Shep Dooley and his former wife, the talented entertainer Kay Hudson. The show is filled with music, dance and comedy, providing a much-needed respite from the challenges of postwar life. As the soldiers enjoy the show, Kay and Shep's on-stage chemistry begins to rekindle old feelings.

== Cast ==
- Betty Grable as Kay Hudson
- Dan Dailey as Sergeant Shep Dooley
- Danny Thomas as P.F.C. Stanley Poppoplis
- Dale Robertson as Captain Johnny Comstock
- Benay Venuta as Billie Barton
- Richard Boone as Mess Sergeant
- Jeffrey Hunter as the Kid
- Frank Fontaine as First Sergeant
- The Dunhill Trio as Dancers

== Production ==
The film marks Betty Grable's final pairing with Dan Dailey, with whom she had costarred in several films. It also includes the first credited role for future film star Jeffrey Hunter.

== Soundtrack ==
- Call Me Mister
  - Written by Harold Rome
  - Performed by chorus during credits
  - Reprised by Betty Grable and Dan Dailey
- Japanese Girl Like 'Merican Boy
  - Written by Sammy Fain
  - Lyrics by Mack Gordon
  - Sung and danced by Betty Grable and chorus
- I'm Gonna Love That Guy Like He's Never Been Loved Before
  - Written by Frances Ash
  - Performed by Betty Grable and male chorus
- Lament to the Pots and Pans
  - Written by Earl K. Brent
  - Lyrics by Jerry Seelen
  - Performed by Danny Thomas
- Goin' Home Train
  - Written by Harold Rome
  - Performed by Bobby Short and male chorus
- I Just Can't Do Enough for You, Baby
  - Written by Sammy Fain
  - Lyrics by Mack Gordon
  - Performed by Betty Grable and Dan Dailey
- Military Life
  - Written by Harold Rome
  - Revised lyrics by Jerry Seelen
  - Performed by Danny Thomas
- Love Is Back in Business
  - Written by Sammy Fain
  - Lyrics by Mack Gordon
  - Performed by Betty Grable, Dan Dailey, Benay Venuta, and Danny Thomas

== Reception ==
In a contemporary review for The New York Times, critic Bosley Crowther called Call Me Mister "a ragtag-and-bobtail show" and wrote: "[T]he simple fact is that 'Call Me Mister' as presented on the screen in a plush Technicolor production by Twentieth Century-Fox is but a faint reminder of .the original stage revue and is mainly a very frank reminder of the sexiness of Miss G. As an Army-employed entertainer in Japan right after the war, engaged—as it seems, incidentally—in putting on a soldier revue, she is flung in your face on most occasions in a variety of revealing costumes via a plot which has her backing and filling with rather elemental urges toward an estranged spouse.
