= Teenage Millionaire =

1961 film directed by Lawrence Doheny

- Theatrical release poster
- Directed by: Lawrence Doheny
- Screenplay by: Lawrence Doheny; Harry Spalding
- Produced by: Howard B. Kreitsek; John Pommer
- Starring: Jimmy Clanton; Rocky Graziano; ZaSu Pitts; Diane Jergens; Joan Tabor; Sid Gould; Maurice Gosfield; Eileen O'Neill
- Cinematography: Gordon Avil; Arthur J. Ornitz
- Edited by: Jack Ruggiero
- Music by: Wilbur Hatch
- Production companies: Clifton Productions; Ludlow Productions
- Distributed by: United Artists
- Release date: August 17, 1961
- Running time: 84 minutes
- Country: United States
- Language: English

Teenage Millionaire is a 1961 American comedy film directed by Lawrence Doheny and written by Lawrence Doheny and Harry Spalding. The film stars Jimmy Clanton, Rocky Graziano, ZaSu Pitts, Diane Jergens, Valerie Ziegler, Cheyenne Boyer, Gloria Prosser, Maurice Gosfield and Eileen O'Neill. The film was released on August 17, 1961, by United Artists.

== Plot ==
Bobby Schultz goes to live with his Aunt Theodora and her butler-bodyguard Rocky following the sudden deaths of his parents. At a radio station she owns, Bobby takes a job and meets a girl, Bambi, who circulates a new record on which Bobby is a vocalist.

As the song catches on and Bobby's reputation grows, Theodora decides it is not to the boy's benefit and decides to sell the radio station. Bobby is then drafted into the Army, saying goodbye to all at a farewell party in his honor.

== Cast ==
- Jimmy Clanton as Bobby Schultz
- Rocky Graziano as Rocky
- ZaSu Pitts as Aunt Theodora
- Diane Jergens as Barbara 'Bambi' Price
- Joan Tabor as Adrienne
- Sid Gould as Sheldon Vale
- Maurice Gosfield as Ernie
- Eileen O'Neil as Desidieria
- Jackie Wilson as himself
- Chubby Checker as himself
- Dion DiMucci as himself
- Bill Black's Combo as themselves
- Marv Johnson as himself
- Vicki Spencer as herself
- Jack Larson as himself
