= Owen McGiveney =

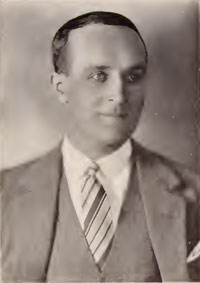
- 1927 publicity photo
- Born: Owen Joseph McGiveney; 4 May 1884; Preston, Lancashire, England
- Died: 31 July 1967 (aged 83); Los Angeles, California, U.S.
- Occupation: Actor
- Years active: 1904–1967

Owen Joseph McGiveney (4 May 1884 – 31 July 1967) was an English-born actor. He initially gained attention as a quick-change artist, and later worked on stage, in films and in television, principally as a character actor in the United States.

== Life and career ==
McGiveney was born in Preston, Lancashire, England. By the age of 20 he had started a career as a straight actor, and in 1910 sailed to the United States to develop his skills. He became noted as a quick-change artist, and shared stages with such stars as Sarah Bernhardt and W. C. Fields. His speciality was to perform as several characters from Dickens' Oliver Twist, including Bill Sykes, Fagin, and Nancy, changing his costume and appearance on stage with "sensational" speed, and being described by one critic as "the most versatile and talented Dickens’ actor the stage has ever known." In 1913, he claimed to have topped the bill and earned up to $2,500 a week while touring America.

He continued to perform regularly and successfully with his quick-change act in British music hall and variety shows, and in American vaudeville, through the 1920s. In the 1930s, he performed both in England and in America; he married while touring in England in 1936.

McGivneey in a 1966 episode of The Monkees.

After the Second World War, McGiveney was invited by stage actor and comedian Ken Murray to appear in his popular revue, Blackouts, in Hollywood. This move reinvigorated McGiveney's career, and he began working in the film industry as a character actor, making his first appearance in If Winter Comes (1947). He appeared in many films during the 1950s and 1960s, including Show Boat (1951), Scaramouche (in the role of Punchinello; 1952), Brigadoon (1954), Journey to the Center of the Earth (1959), and My Fair Lady (1964). He also made a number of television appearances in shows including 77 Sunset Strip, Perry Mason, The Outer Limits, The Monkees, and Batman.

He died in the Motion Picture Hospital, Woodland Hills, Los Angeles, in 1967 at the age of 83. His daughter was the actress Maura McGiveney.

== Television ==
Year	Title	Role	Notes
1966	The Monkees	Old Man	S1:E12, "I've Got a Little Song Here"
