= Twist Around the Clock =

1961 film by Oscar Rudolph

- Theatrical Poster
- Directed by: Oscar Rudolph
- Written by: Robert E. Kent
- Produced by: Sam Katzman
- Starring: Chubby Checker
- Cinematography: Gordon Avil
- Edited by: Jerome Thoms
- Music by: Freddy Karger
- Distributed by: Columbia Pictures
- Release date: December 30, 1961
- Running time: 86 minutes
- Country: United States
- Language: English
- Box office: $1.4 million (US/Canada)

Twist Around the Clock is a 1961 American musical film directed by Oscar Rudolfph and starring Chubby Checker. It was written by Robert E. Kent and was a remake of Rock Around the Clock (1956). It was followed by the sequel Don't Knock the Twist (1962).

== Plot ==
Mitch Mason, ex-manager of a once-successful rock band named Jimmy Cook and his Kooks, discovers a dance craze known as the Twist being performed in the small mountain town of Alpine Peaks. He books a band led by Clay Cole and dancers Tina Louden and her brother Larry for a Boston society benefit, and they create a sensation. They are unable to get other bookings, however, because Mitch has spurned the advances of Debbie Marshall, whose father Joe is New York's top talent agent. However, a friend of Mitch's books them into a club where Chubby Checker and Dion DiMucci are also appearing. They are an instant success, and the Twist sweeps New York. When Debbie suspects that Mitch is falling in love with Tina, she gets her father to sign the group on the condition that Tina abstain from marriage for 3 years. The Twisters appear on a nationwide TV jamboree, and Mr. Marshall learns that Mitch and Tina were secretly married before signing the contracts.

== Cast ==
- Chubby Checker as himself
- Dion DiMucci as himself (as Dion)
- Vicki Spencer as herself
- The Marcels as themselves
  - Cornelius Harp (lead singer)
  - Fred Johnson (bass singer)
  - Gene Bricker
  - Ronald Mundy
  - Richard Knauss
  - Allen Johnson
- Clay Cole as himself
- John Cronin as Mitch Mason
- Mary Mitchel as Tina Louden (as Mary Mitchell)
- Maura McGiveney as Debbie Marshall
- Tol Avery as Joe Marshall
- Alvy Moore as Dizzy Bellew
- Lenny Kent as Georgie Clark
- Tom Middleton as Jimmy Cook
- Jeff Malloy as Larry Louden (as Jeff Parker)
- John Bryant as Harry Davis

== Production ==
Producer Sam Katzman said: "Twist Around the Clock only cost $250,000 to make, but in less than six months it grossed six million – so of course I'm gonna make more 'Twist' movies!".

== Critical reception ==
Variety wrote: "The Great American Twist Picture has yet to be made, but Columbia's version should more than hold its own in the current scramble to cash in on America's latest contribution to world culture while it is still a hot, fresh, sweepstakes issue. Sam Katzman production is attractively and resourcefully mounted and endowed with a reasonable sense of dramatic content and concern for characterization, so that it is not entirely a string of teen-geared nitery acts united without purpose or direction."

The Monthly Film Bulletin wrote: "Ritual show-biz plot threading together a string of badly staged Twist acts, including that of the Twist king, Chubby Checker. As abysmal as Rock Around the Clock, it will conceivably make as much money."

Describing the film as having "something resembling a plot," critic Eleanor Mannikka wrote in AllMovie that "In the end, this teen-oriented tale is best remembered for two of Dion's hit songs, "Runaround Sue" and "The Wanderer".

Writing for Turner Classic Movies, critic Rob Nixon described the film as "a remake of the first true rock 'n' roll musical, Rock Around the Clock, with a nearly identical plot."

A review of the film in TV Guide described it as "a bit of good fun" that "bears a certain naive charm of a long-gone era," and that it "is really just an excuse for plenty of rock tunes."
