= Oscar Rudolph =

American film and television director (1911–1991)

- Born: April 2, 1911; Cleveland, Ohio, U.S.
- Died: February 1, 1991 (aged 79); Encino, Los Angeles, California, U.S.
- Occupations: Film and television director, actor, producer
- Years active: 1925–1976
- Known for: Directing more than 500 television episodes
- Spouse: Sylvia Rudolph
- Children: 2, including Alan Rudolph

Oscar Rudolph (April 2, 1911 – February 1, 1991) was an American film and television director, producer, and actor. His career began during the silent film era and subsequently extended into television, where he directed more than 500 episodes of series including The Donna Reed Show, The Lone Ranger, McHale's Navy, and Batman.

== Life and career ==
=== Early life and acting career ===
Rudolph was born in Cleveland, Ohio, and moved to Southern California with his family in 1924. He began working in Hollywood as a child actor, making his screen debut at the age of 14 in Little Annie Rooney (1925), a silent comedy-drama starring Mary Pickford. He played Athos, one of the children appearing alongside Pickford's character.

Over the following two decades, Rudolph appeared in 36 films, often in minor or uncredited roles. His acting credits included So This Is College (1929), Their Own Desire (1929), Divorce in the Family (1932), This Day and Age (1933), and College Scandal (1935). His final listed acting appearance was in Easy Come, Easy Go (1947).

=== Transition to directing ===
While continuing to work in films, Rudolph moved into production and assistant directing during the 1940s. His assistant director credits included The Story of Dr. Wassell (1944), Road to Rio (1947), and The Mating Season (1951). He subsequently worked as a second-unit director on several productions.

As television expanded in the 1950s, Rudolph increasingly concentrated on directing episodes of television series. His early television work included The Hunter, starring Barry Nelson, followed by The Thin Man, starring Peter Lawford and Phyllis Kirk.

He went on to direct episodes of more than 500 television shows, with credits spanning westerns, dramas, sitcoms, and adventure series. Among the productions on which he worked were The Jane Wyman Show, The Donna Reed Show, The Lone Ranger, McHale's Navy, The Phyllis Diller Show, My Favorite Martian, Batman, I Dream of Jeannie, and The Brady Bunch.

=== Feature film directing ===
Rudolph's first credited feature film as director was The Rocket Man (1954), a science fiction comedy starring Charles Coburn, Spring Byington, and Anne Francis. The screenplay was written by Lenny Bruce and Jack Henley.

In the early 1960s, he directed two musical films associated with the popularity of the twist dance. Twist Around the Clock (1961), produced by Sam Katzman, featured performances by Chubby Checker, Dion, and The Marcels. Rudolph subsequently directed Don't Knock the Twist (1962), another Katzman production featuring Checker alongside Gene Chandler and Vic Dana.

Also in 1962, Rudolph directed the western The Wild Westerners, starring James Philbrook, Nancy Kovack, and guitarist Duane Eddy. Produced by Katzman, the film was made on a short shooting schedule and released by Columbia Pictures.

=== Second-unit directing and later television work ===
Alongside his work as a principal director, Rudolph continued to take second-unit assignments on feature films. He served as second-unit director on The Flight of the Phoenix (1965), directed by Robert Aldrich. His involvement is documented in both the American Film Institute catalog and the Criterion Collection's production credits.

Other second-unit credits included The Molly Maguires (1970) and Too Late the Hero (1970). He remained active in television directing during the late 1960s and early 1970s, working on series such as I Dream of Jeannie, The Brady Bunch, Adam-12, Room 222, and Love, American Style.

== Personal life and death ==
Rudolph was married to Sylvia Rudolph for 53 years. The couple had two children, including Alan Rudolph, who became a film director, screenwriter, and producer.

Rudolph died on February 1, 1991, at Encino Hospital Medical Center in Encino, Los Angeles, California, from complications following a stroke. He was 79 years old and was survived by his wife, son, and daughter.

== Partial filmography ==
=== As an actor ===
Year	Film	Notes
1925	Little Annie Rooney	Role of Athos
1929	So This Is College	
1929	Their Own Desire	
1932	Divorce in the Family	
1933	This Day and Age	
1935	College Scandal	
1947	Easy Come, Easy Go	Final listed acting credit

=== As a feature film director ===
Year	Film	Genre
1954	The Rocket Man	Science fiction comedy
1961	Twist Around the Clock	Musical
1962	Don't Knock the Twist	Musical comedy
1962	The Wild Westerners	Western

=== Selected television directing credits ===
Series
The Lone Ranger
The Thin Man
The Jane Wyman Show
The Donna Reed Show
McHale's Navy
My Favorite Martian
The Phyllis Diller Show
Gidget
Batman
The Flying Nun
I Dream of Jeannie
The Brady Bunch
Adam-12
Room 222
Love, American Style
