= The Earth Angels =

Spanish vocal group

Earth Angels
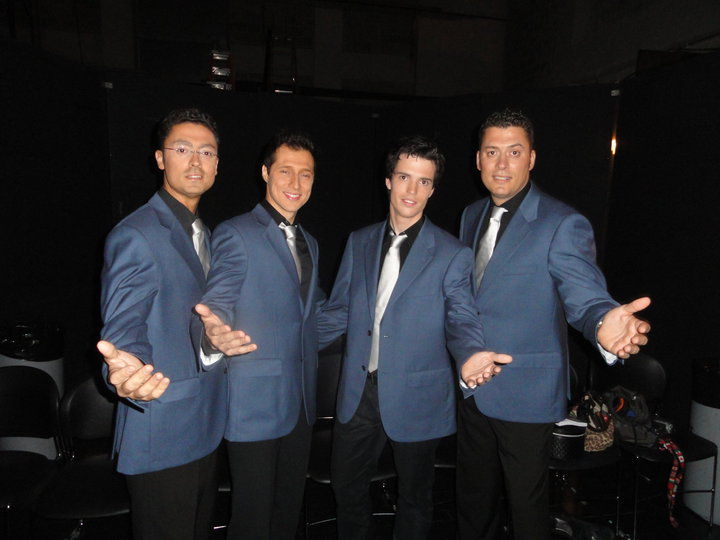

Background information
- Origin: Barcelona, Spain
- Genre: Doo-wop
- Instrument: Vocals
- Years active: 2007–present
- Members: Jordi Majó; Christian Carrasco; Joan Carrasco; Pol Daurella; Oscar López
- Website: Earth Angels

The Earth Angels are a Spanish doo-wop vocal group from Barcelona, Catalonia which performs a cappella music. While on tour, they also sing on city streets. The group formed in 2007, when bass-baritone Christian Carrasco (son of Rafael Carrasco, second drummer of the Spanish band Los Sírex) announced that he was looking for a doo-wop singer and subsequently found lead vocalist Jordi Majó.

They specialize in cover versions of rare doo-wop songs, many originally recorded between 1958 and 1964. The Earth Angels released a music video, directed by David Conill and Christina Scheper, in which they covered the Valiants' 1958 "This is the Night for Love".

The group released Street Corner Style, an album of 15 covers and two original songs, in 2010. That album was promoted heavily by Oldies Radio DJ 'Wild' Wayne on America's longest running Oldies Radio Show, 'The RnR Memory Machine on WWUH Radio in Ct. They were called the premier band of Rockin' Records' Today's Doo Wop Masters Series.

The Earth Angels owe their success in the United States to their discovery by Doowop Cafe host Joe Conroy (DJ Brad). The Internet radio station is dedicated to preserving 1950s American music. Conroy found a cover of the Capris' "My Island in The Sun" which the group had uploaded to YouTube, reached out to them by mail, suggested that they make a studio recording, and helped produce and distribute their music. Carmen Kaye, presenter of the Australian Internet radio show Doo Wop Corner, included them on her worldwide list of featured present-day doo-wop groups.

== Origins ==
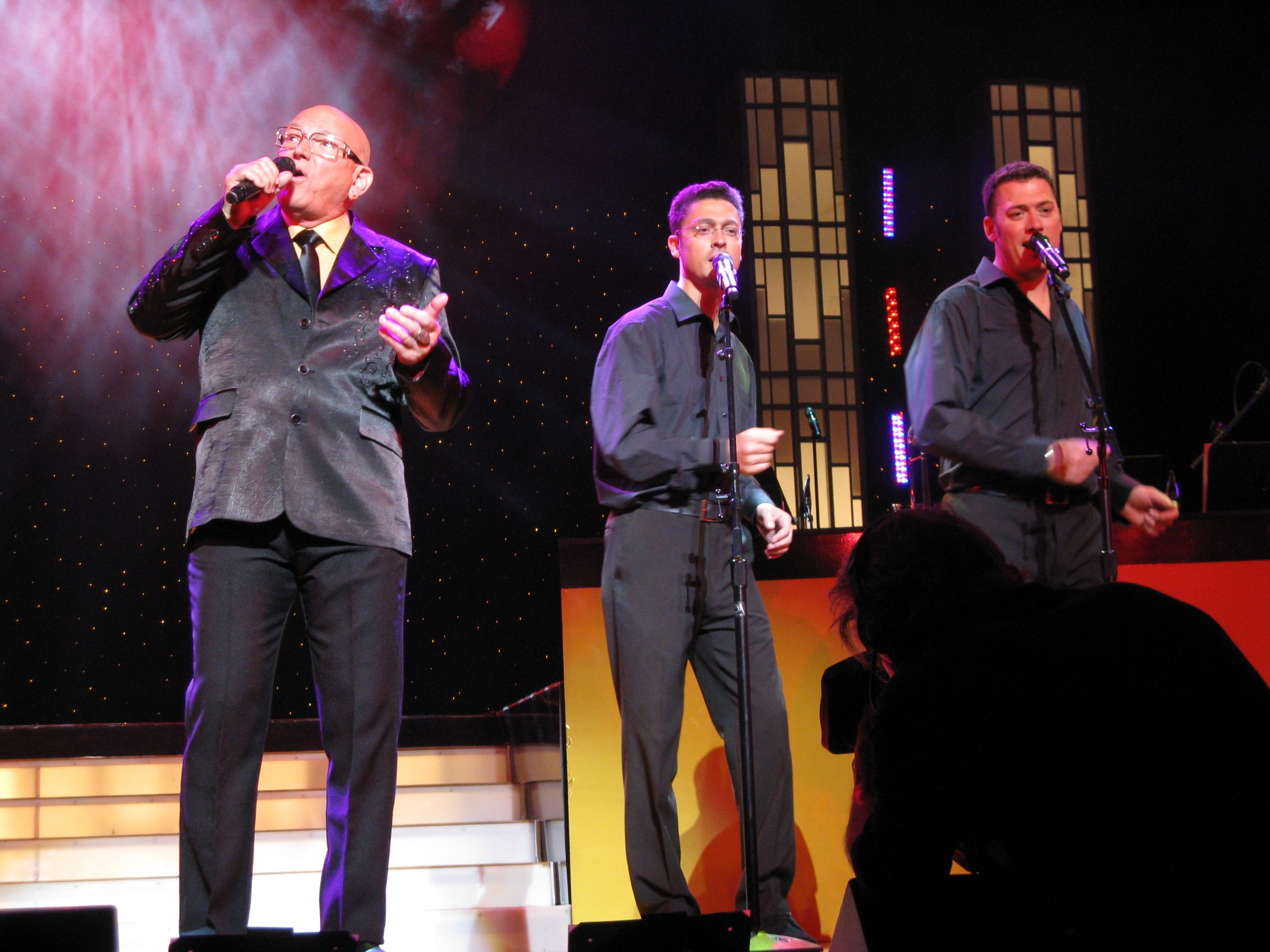
The Carrasco brothers perform with John Gummoe, lead singer of The Cascades and writer of "Rhythm of the Rain", in 2006.

Lead vocalist Jordi Majó was introduced to American popular music by his mother, and had listened to jazz, doo-wop and rock and roll since childhood. His father bought him his first doo-wop record, Classics Original Doo Wop Hits, 1955-1965 (Vogue PIP), when he was eight years old. After hearing the Ly-Dells' "Genie of the Lamp" of and the Valentines' "Lily Maebelle", he began to love doo-wop and collected his own records.

The Carrasco brothers, Christian, and Joan, inherited their father's taste for doo-wop classics. Since infancy, they and their mother sang along with songs by the Five Latinos, the Diamonds and Rocky Sharpe and the Replays. The Spanish radio program Flor de Pasión also developed the boys' interest in doo-wop music.

Joan developed a musical ear at an early age, learned to play the piano, guitar, drums and harmonica and was a member of Cram, a rock band. After discovering the Crystalairs, a German vocal group, Christian developed a particular interest in their musical style. In 2007, he reunited with an old friend and began practicing vocal harmony on the streets of Barcelona. They formed a group called Street Candles, which split up into the Velvet Candles and the Earth Angels.

== Career ==
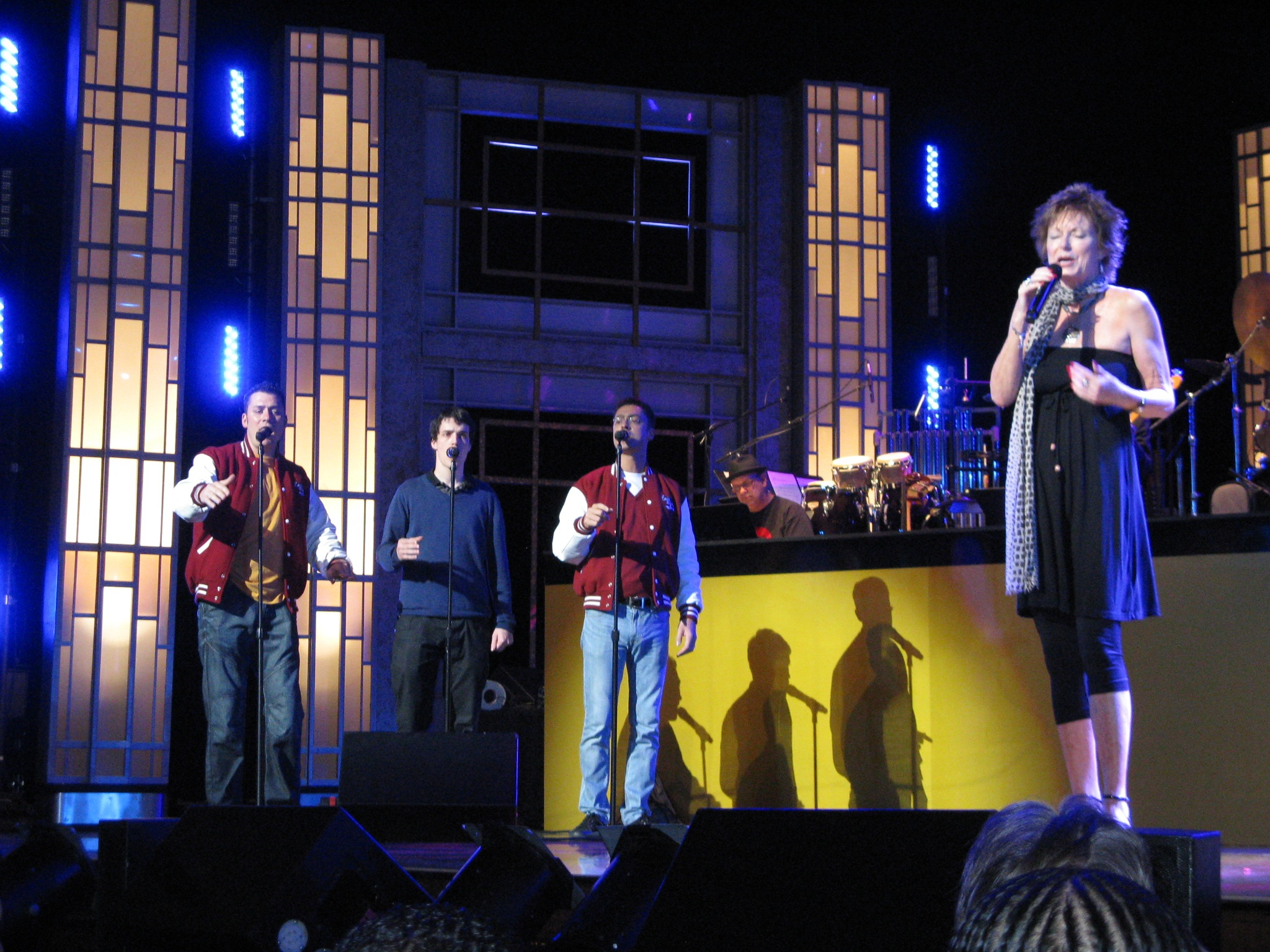
Joan, Pol and Christian perform "A Thousand Stars" with its original singer, Kathy Young.

Street Candles was a short, intense introduction to the music scene. After performing on the streets, they were hired by the Soul Productions audiovisual company to film a commemorative video for the fifth anniversary of the music program Silenci. The video was sponsored by the Spanish television channels TV3 and El 33. After the release of their video performance of "I Don't Wanna Grow Up", they were contacted by night clubs such as the Pequeña Betty and the Irish Rover in Madrid.

The Velvet Candles' invitation to entertain at Iñaki Urdangarín's birthday party, attended by the Spanish royal family, increased their popularity. After disagreements and lineup changes, Christian, Jordi and Joan renamed the group the Earth Angels.

In 2008, the Earth Angels appeared in a television commercial for the Vodafone telecommunications company. The following year, they contributed "In Your Company" to a doo-wop compilation album released by Crystal Ball Records. Taller de Músics de Barcelona vocalist Pol Daurella joined the Earth Angels for rehearsals in mid-2010, and helped them prepare the release of their first studio album before joining the group. The Earth Angels have performed and appeared on radio and television stations in Barcelona and the Balearic Islands. Christian's brother Joan later joined the group, and they recorded their first version of the Crests' "Step by Step". In a little over four months. their website received about 12,000 visits. According to Jordi Majó, the secret of the group's success is maintaining the essence and spontaneity of live performances. Their name was inspired by a British tourist who said, "You sing like the angels", and by their religious beliefs.

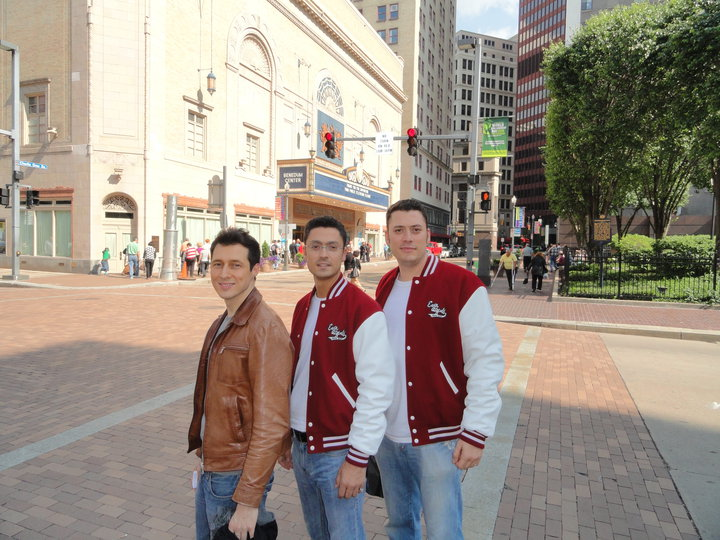
(left to right) Jordi, Christian and Joan opposite the Benedum Center in Pittsburgh

In 2010, Pol Daurella joined the group. Daurella was followed in 2011 by Oscar López, making the Earth Angels a quintet. Kingsley Abbot gave their album, Street Corner Style, four stars in a Record Collector review:

Until very recently, The Earth Angels could be found harmonizing on the streets of Barcelona. With this debut album, however, they’ve turned in one of the most satisfying and credible modern doo-wop collections we’ve ever heard. The Angels have three key assets: impeccable choice of rare songs to cover; great background vocal arrangements, with each of the three group members tackling a wide range; and a particularly youthful and attractive lead voice in Jordi Majo.

In May 2010, the group participated in a doo-wop festival at the Benedum Center for the Performing Arts in Pittsburgh. Other performers included the Quotations, the Marcels and the Edsels, who recorded "Rama Lama Ding Dong". At the Hilton Hotel, the Earth Angels performed an a cappella cover of the "A Thousand Stars" with the Quotations and Kathy Young (who sang the original version). The group participated in the seventh Phonica festival in the Catalan town of Banyoles on June 25, 2010, and the February 12, 2011 Rock, Rhythm & Doo-Wop! festival in the Dutch town of Oss.
