= Houston, We've Got a Problem =

- Genre: Drama / Sci-Fi
- Written by: Jeremy Helson
- Directed by: Lawrence Doheny
- Starring: Robert Culp; Clu Gulager; Gary Collins; Sandra Dee; Ed Nelson
- Music by: Richard Clements
- Country of origin: United States
- Original language: English

Production
- Executive producer: Harve Bennett
- Producer: Herman S. Saunders
- Production locations: Johnson Space Center - 2101 NASA Rd., Houston, Texas
- Cinematography: J.J. Jones
- Editor: Robert F. Shugrue
- Running time: 74 min.
- Production companies: Silverton Productions; Universal Television

Original release
- Network: ABC
- Release: March 2, 1974

Houston, We've Got a Problem is an American made-for-television drama film broadcast on 30 February 1974 on ABC about the Apollo 13 spaceflight, directed by Lawrence Doheny and starring Ed Nelson in the role of NASA Flight Director Gene Kranz.

== Technical and historical accuracy ==
The title of the film is a misquotation of the ominous announcement made by Commander Jim Lovell following the explosion of an oxygen tank which tore off the side of the spacecraft's service module. Lovell actually said, "Houston, we've had a problem."

The film does not focus on the spaceflight itself, but rather on the crises in Mission Control. Jim Lovell wrote a letter to TV Guide about the film, saying that the crises in Mission Control were dramatized. "NASA did a disservice to the flight crew and ground personnel connected with Apollo 13 by co-operating fully with this film. I resent the mixing of fact and fiction," said Lovell, who called the film "fictitious and in poor taste."

Executive producer Herman Saunders said he could have never sold the television station on a documentary and that warnings were added to the film to indicate it was fictitious.
