= Eileen O'Neill =

American film and television actress

- Born: Eileen T. O'Neill; July 3, 1939 (age 86); Philadelphia, Pennsylvania, U.S.
- Occupations: Film and television actress
- Spouse: William D. Holmes (m. 1961; annul. 1964)

Eileen T. O'Neill (born July 3, 1939) is an American film and television actress. She is known for playing Sgt. Gloria Ames in the American detective fiction television series Burke's Law.

== Life and career ==
O'Neill was born in Philadelphia, Pennsylvania, the daughter of Mary and Harry O'Neill. At an early age she decided that she wanted to become an actress after watching films with her mother. She attended the Philadelphia School of Modeling and Charm, and participated in beauty pageants, which led to appearances on the television series The Joe Pyne Show. She moved to California and appeared in a Pepsi commercial. After taking acting lessons she made her film debut in 1960 in A Majority of One.

O'Neill's next appearance was in the 1961 film Teenage Millionaire, alongside singer Jimmy Clanton and professional boxer Rocky Graziano. From 1963 to 1965, she co-starred in the detective fiction television series Burke's Law, playing Sgt. Gloria Ames.

O'Neill appeared in further television programs including The Munsters, The Rogues, My Favorite Martian, Batman, The Alfred Hitchcock Hour, I'm Dickens, He's Fenster, Get Smart, The Beverly Hillbillies, I Dream of Jeannie and Bewitched. She appeared in the 1968 film A Man Called Dagger, where she played Erica. Her final credit was in the 1970 film Loving. She was offered a starring role in There Was a Crooked Man..., but rejected it because of the nudity.

As of 2026, Eileen resides at The Kensington in Redondo Beach, California.

== Selected filmography ==
- The Alfred Hitchcock Hour (1963) (Season 1 Episode 21: "I'll Be Judge – I'll Be Jury") as Laura Needham
