= A Man Called Dagger =

1968 film by Richard Rush

- Film poster by Frank McCarthy
- Directed by: Richard Rush
- Screenplay by: Leighton J. Peatman; Robert S. Weekley
- Produced by: Lewis M. Horwitz
- Starring: Terry Moore; Jan Murray; Sue Ane Langdon; Paul Mantee; Eileen O'Neill; Maureen Arthur; Leonard Stone; Mimi Dillard; Richard Kiel
- Cinematography: László Kovács
- Edited by: Tom Boutross; Len Miller
- Music by: Steve Allen
- Production company: Global Screen Associates
- Distributed by: Metro-Goldwyn-Mayer
- Release date: January 31, 1968
- Running time: 86 minutes
- Country: United States
- Language: English

A Man Called Dagger (1968) is a low-budget spy film that was the first collaboration between director Richard Rush, cinematographer László Kovács, and stuntman Gary Warner Kent (who also did the film's special effects).

It was filmed in 1966 by Lew Horwitz's Global Screen Associates (GSA) under the title Why Spy? The film was originally intended to have been released by Mike Ripps' Cinema Distributors of America (CDA) in September 1966. When GSA and CDA's partnership collapsed, the film was picked up by MGM and released a year later.

== Plot ==
Secret agents Dick Dagger and Harper Davis are on the trail of former SS Colonel Rudolph Koffman, who is using a meat-packing plant as his secret lair.

Ingrid is Koffman's mistress and runs a beauty spa. A massage therapist there, Joy, reveals to Dagger that another employee, Erica, is being held captive in Koffman's secret lair. Erica has been brainwashed and tries to kill Dagger, but does not succeed.

After the madman also kidnaps Harper, it is up to Dagger to stage a daring rescue operation. He is captured and tortured, but escapes thanks to a laser beam in his wristwatch. Koffman tries to kill him with a meat cleaver, but Dagger foils the villain and gets the women.

== Cast ==
- Paul Mantee as Dick Dagger
- Jan Murray as Rudolph Koffman
- Terry Moore as Harper Davis
- Maureen Arthur as Joy
- Richard Kiel as Otto
- Eileen O'Neill as Erica
- Sue Ane Langdon as Ingrid
- Bruno VeSota as Dr. Grulik
- Mimi Dillard as Melissa
- Leonard Stone as Karl Rainer

== Score ==
Steve Allen composed the film's score with Ronald Stein arranging and conducting it. Maureen Arthur sang Buddy Kaye's lyrics to Allen's title song.

== Deleted scenes ==
Sue Ane Langdon recalled several scenes that did not make the final print. One featured a West Highland White Terrier whose fur was dyed to match Langdon's hair in the film. When she toured with the dog, people thought the fur colouring was hurting the dog. Most of the dog’s scenes were left out of the final cut. Langdon also recalled scenes of people hanging on meat hooks that were cut.

== See also ==
- List of American films of 1968
