= Lawrence Doheny =

American film director

Lawrence Doheny (14 April 1924 - 7 September 1982) was an Irish-born American television and film director who directed more than 100 episodes of television from the 1950s to the 1980s.

== Career ==
Born in Limerick, Doheny emigrated to the United States in the 1930s and began directing for television, first on the series The Big Story and Rescue 8. In 1961, he wrote and directed a feature film, Teenage Millionaire. This would be Doheny's only foray into feature films. For the rest of his career he directed television series, most notably Adam-12 (13 episodes), The Rockford Files (12 episodes), Black Sheep Squadron (8 episodes), and Magnum, P.I. (8 episodes).

Doheny also directed television films. In 1974, he directed Houston, We've Got a Problem, the first dramatization of the Apollo 13 mission. In 1975, he directed The Unwanted, a drama about a plot to smuggle impoverished Irish immigrants from Canada into the United States.

He was married to Margaret Mangan, and had three children. He died in Los Angeles at the age of 58.
