= Do Not Disturb (1965 film) =

1965 romantic comedy film

- Theatrical release poster
- Directed by: Ralph Levy; George Marshall
- Screenplay by: Richard L. Breen; Milt Rosen
- Based on: Some Other Love play by William Fairchild
- Produced by: Martin Melcher; Aaron Rosenberg
- Starring: Doris Day; Rod Taylor
- Cinematography: Leon Shamroy
- Edited by: Robert L. Simpson
- Music by: Lionel Newman; Alexander Courage
- Distributed by: 20th Century-Fox
- Release date: December 22, 1965
- Running time: 102 minutes
- Country: United States
- Language: English
- Budget: $3.89 million
- Box office: $8 million

Do Not Disturb is a DeLuxe Color CinemaScope (1965) romantic comedy film directed by Ralph Levy and starring Doris Day and Rod Taylor as a married American couple living in England.

== Plot ==
American couple Mike and Janet Harper move to England for Mike's work with a company that deals in textiles and fashions. Mike wants to live in a flat in the heart of London, but Janet instead finds a rural estate 30 miles outside London in Kent, and Mike must commute into the city by train. For convenience, Mike often stays in a company's flat in London rather than returning to Kent, but his absence causes Janet to feel lonely and neglected.

Janet believes that Mike may be having an affair with his assistant Claire Hackett, and the Harpers' busybody landlady Vanessa Courtwright encourages Janet to play Mike's game by entering into an affair of her own, even if it is fake. However, the affair may become a reality when the suave Italian antiques dealer Paul Bellari arrives to decorate the house. Bellari whisks Janet off to Paris, where she is introduced to several children. Janet manages to deflect his advances despite her inebriation after drinking champagne. Janet deflects Bellari's advances by hitting him on the cheek. Paul finds out and figures out that nothing happened. There was a work party thrown byPaul's employer. The only person who knows that Janet is his wife but Mr. Simmons. Eventually, Paul and Janet learn that their suspicions were false and they reconcile with each other.

== Cast ==
- Doris Day as Janet Harper
- Rod Taylor as Mike Harper
- Hermione Baddeley as Vanessa Courtwright
- Sergio Fantoni as Paul Bellari
- Reginald Gardiner as George Simmons
- Maura McGiveney as Claire Hackett
- Aram Katcher as Culkos
- Leon Askin as Willie Langsdorf
- Lisa Perav as Alicia Petrova
- Michael Romanoff as Delegate
- Albert Carrier as Claude Reynard
- Barbara Morrison as Mrs. Ordley
- Dick Winslow as One-Man Band / Accordion Player
- Raquel Welch as Woman in lobby
- Britt Ekland as Party Girl

== Production ==
George Marshall was recruited to replace original director Ralph Levy, who contracted a viral disease during filming. This change caused the film to finish behind schedule.

== Reception ==
The film had admissions of 10,730 in France.

According to Fox records, the film needed to earn $7,300,000 in rentals to break even and made $5,275,000, meaning it made a loss.

In the New York Times, Bosley Crowther described the film as "without wit, in script and direction, which fall back upon such leaden things as Miss Day getting pickled in Paris and joining a bunch of youngsters in a sidewalk soccer game or innocently entering the hotel bedroom of the big wool buyer instead of that of her spouse."

== Novelization ==
In advance of the film's release, as was the custom of the era, a paperback novelization of the film was published by Dell Books. The author was renowned crime and western novelist Marvin H. Albert, who had written other books related to films to coincide with their releases.

== See also ==
- List of American films of 1965
