= Maura McGiveney =

English actress (1939–1990)

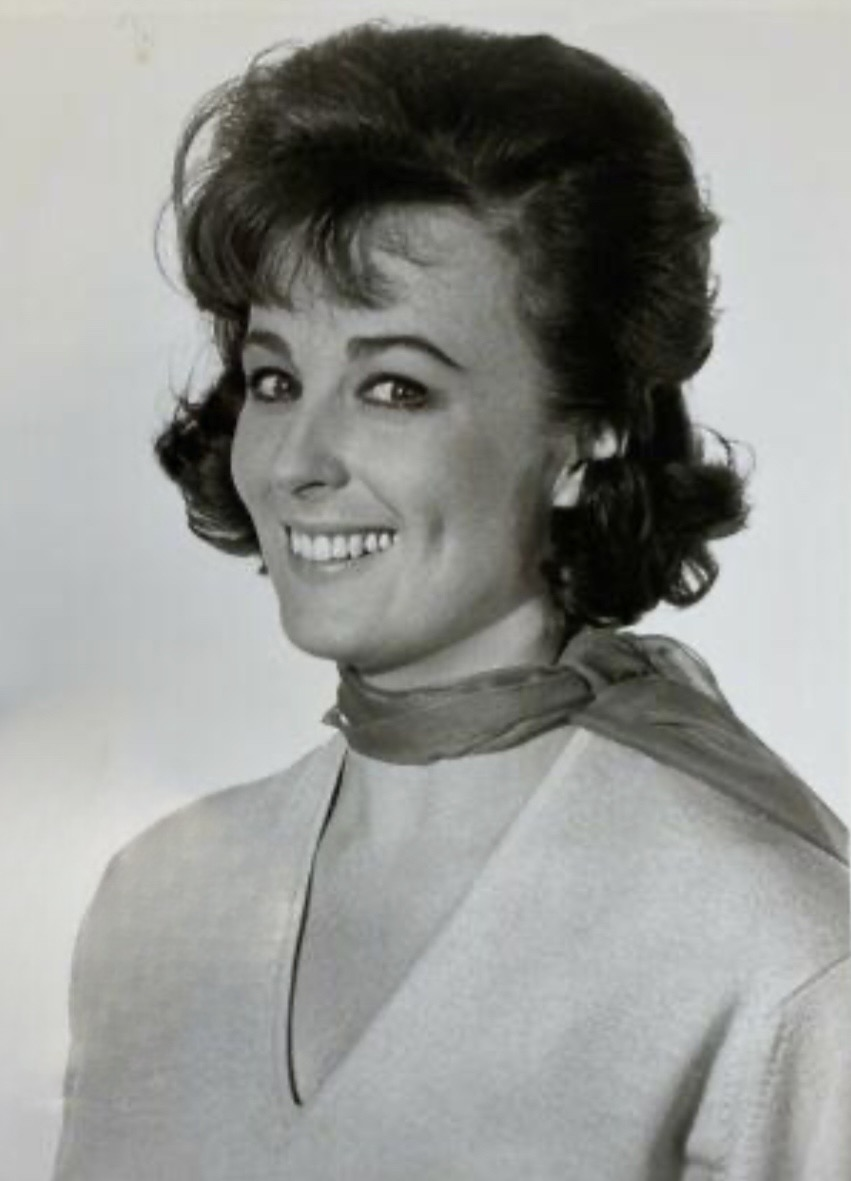
- McGiveney in Do Not Disturb (1965)
- Born: Mary Alish McGiveney; 28 February 1939; London, England
- Died: 10 November 1990 (aged 51); Sherman Oaks, California, U.S.
- Resting place: San Fernando Mission Cemetery
- Occupation: Actress
- Years active: 1959–1987
- Spouse: Bill Dana (m. 1972; div. 1972)

Mary Alish "Maura" McGiveney (28 February 1939 – 10 November 1990) was an English-American film and television actress during the 1960s and 1970s. She appeared several times in such TV series as Hawaii Five-0 and Perry Mason, The Virginian ("Day of the Scorpion"), Straightaway, The Hollywood Palace, Adam-12, McHale's Navy, My Three Sons, Peter Gunn, The Fugitive, The Flying Nun, Death Valley Days, and Dr. Kildare.

== Early life ==
She was born 28 February 1939, in London, England, the daughter of the "quick change" actor Owen McGiveney and Elizabeth Hughes. McGiveney traveled with her father, so she grew up in England, France, Ireland, and the United States. She said, "I attended school wherever we happened to be". She studied at the Royal Academy of Dramatic Arts and first came to Hollywood to work in film.

== Career ==
McGiveney earned a Golden Globe nomination from the Hollywood Foreign Press Association as Most Promising Newcomer of 1966 for her role as Claire Hackett in the farce Do Not Disturb with Doris Day and Rod Taylor. She was also in the films Twist Around the Clock with Chubby Checker, W.I.A. Wounded in Action", Once You Kiss a Stranger and Destination America. On stage she appeared in Harvey, The Second City and The Fantasticks, among many other productions.

McGiveney was a comedian and singer as well as an actress. In what she hoped would be her ticket to fame, she appeared in a program similar to the successful TV show Laugh-In titled Turn-On. Turn on's sole episode aired on February 5, 1969, with the curvaceous McGiveney as "The Body Politic". The rather sexually explicit theme, jokes and remarks of Turn-On led to ABC affiliates refusing to broadcast the second episode, and the sponsor Bristol-Myers immediately canceled it. Miss McGiveney expressed shock when the show was canceled, even though five shows were filmed and twenty-one more planned. She said "I still can't understand it. We were all so sure it was going to be a big hit"

== Death ==
McGiveney died on 10 November 1990 in Los Angeles, aged 51, after a battle with liver disease. She was survived by her long-time partner, the television scriptwriter Worley Thorne.

== Filmography ==
- North by Northwest (1959) - Attendant #2 (uncredited)
- Twist Around the Clock (1961) - Debbie Marshall
- Do Not Disturb (1965) - Claire Hackett
- W.I.A. Wounded in Action (1966) - Lt. Marietta Dodd
- Once You Kiss a Stranger (1969) - Harriet Parker
