= Street Corner Style =

Studio album by The Earth Angels
- Released: May 2010
- Genre: Doo wop

Street Corner Style is the first album by the Spanish doo wop band the Earth Angels. It was released in May 2010.

A review in Record Collector magazine characterized the album as evoking Bronx and Queens street music of the early 1960s, and described the album "one of the most satisfying and credible modern doo wop collections we’ve ever heard."

== Track listing ==
No.	Title	Writer(s)	Length
1.	"Tomorrow"	The Decoys	3:03
2.	"I Love You"	The Volumes	2:47
3.	"So Real"	The Chantels	2:46
4.	"Weakness"	Jordi Majó	2:17
5.	"Chance"	Rollins & Trailor The Sierras	2:54
6.	"In My Heart"	C. Johnson & C. Smith The Timetones	2:54
7.	"My Island in the sun"	The Capris	2:36
8.	"This is the night"	The Valiants	2:54
9.	"Nothing can go wrong"	The Domineers	2:15
10.	"Come home"	A. Browne & E. Moore Eddie & The Starlites	2:43
11.	"Lift up your head"	A. Gourdine The Chesters	2:24
12.	"It's going to be alright"	Rose The Decoys	1:49
13.	"Don't wanna grow up"	Tom Waits	2:28
14.	"Look into the sky"	J. Strong The Lytations	2:31
15.	"Bad girl"	W. Robinson & B. Grady The Miracles	2:59
16.	"Just one more chance"	S. Coslow & A. Johnston The Demensions	2:09
17.	"Weakness Acappella"	Jordi Majó	2:16
