= Out in the Cold Again =

Single by Glen Gray and Casa Loma Orchestra
- A-side: "Learning"
- Released: 1934
- Genre: Jazz
- Length: 3:15
- Label: Brunswick
- Songwriters: Ted Koehler, Rube Bloom

Glen Gray and Casa Loma Orchestra singles chronology
"Moonglow" (1934)	"Out in the Cold Again" (1934)	"Pardon My Southern Accent" (1934)

"Out in the Cold Again" is a song written by Ted Koehler and Rube Bloom and first performed by Glen Gray and the Casa Loma Orchestra. It reached #4 on the US chart in 1934.

== Other charting versions ==
- In 1951, Richard Hayes released a version as a single which reached #9 on the US pop chart.
- In 1957, The Teenagers featuring Frankie Lymon released a version as a single which reached #10 on the US R&B chart.

== Other versions ==
- Johnnie Ray featuring The Four Lads released a version of the song as the B-side to their 1952 single "Walkin' My Baby Back Home".
- Ferlin Husky released a version of the song on his 1957 EP, Boulevard of Broken Dreams.
- Sam Fletcher released a version of the song as a single in 1959, but it did not chart.
- Dean Martin released a version of the song on his 1959 album, A Winter Romance.
- Kay Starr released a version of the song as the B-side to her 1960 single "Just for a Thrill".
- Sam Cooke released a version of the song on his 1961 album, My Kind of Blues.
- The Dovells released a version of the song as the B-side to their 1961 single "Bristol Stomp".
- Clark Terry released a version of the song on his 1961 album, Everything's Mellow.
- Gene Ammons, Sonny Stitt, and Jack McDuff released a version of the song on their 1962 album, Soul Summit.
- Etta Jones released a version of the song on her 1962 album, Lonely and Blue.
- The Earls released a version of the song on their 1963 album, Remember Me Baby.
- Brenda Lee released a version of the song as the B-side to her 1963 single "I Wanna Be Around". It was featured in her album, ..."Let Me Sing".
- Jean DuShon released a version of the song as a single in 1966, but it did not chart.
- George Benson released a version of the song on his 1969 album, Tell It Like It Is.
- Dinah Washington released a version of the song on her 1987 compilation album, The Complete Dinah Washington on Mercury, Vol. 2 (1950-1952).
- The Crests released a version of the song on their 1993 compilation album, The Best of the Rest of Johnny Maestro & the Crests.
- Julia Lee released a version of the song on her 1995 compilation album, Kansas City Star.
- Ronnie Spector released a version of the song on her 2006 album, The Last of the Rock Stars.
