= Dunhill Trio =

American dance team

The Dunhill Trio was an American popular dance team of the 20th century. They were called by other names such as the Three Dunhills, the Dunhills, the Dancin' Dunhills and the Dunhill Dance Team.

The Dunhill Trio were Bob Roberts, Lou Spencer and Art Stanley. Lou Spencer is the father of singer Vicki Spencer. Other members included Walter Long, Jerry Kurland and John Buwen.

The trio was active in the late 1940s, 1950s, and early 1960s. They appeared on American television variety shows including the Ed Sullivan Show, Dean Martin Show, George Burns Show, Nat King Cole Show, The Hollywood Palace, Cavalcade of Bands (TV series) and others.

The Dunhills appear in the 1951 film Call Me Mister starring Betty Grable. The trio performed a tap dance sketch which had been originated by African-American dancers at the Apollo Theater and Harlem Opera House.
