= The Dovells =

American rhythm and blues singers

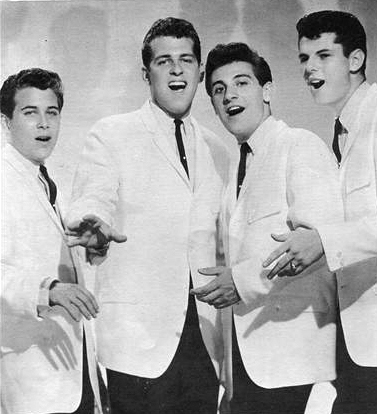
The Dovells in 1962

The Dovells were an American doo-wop group, formed at Overbrook High School in Philadelphia in 1957, under the name 'The Brooktones'. The original members were Arnie Silver, Len Borisoff, Jerry Gross (alias Summers), Mike Freda, and Jim Mealey (alias Danny Brooks). Their first single "No, No, No" was a local hit for The Brooktones.

== Parkway Records Era ==
Summers left the Brooktones in 1959 to form the group The Gems with Summers, Mark Stevens, Mike Freda, Warren Purdy, and Roland Scarinci. The remaining Brooktones signed to Parkway Records in 1960 and added Jerry Sirlen and William Shunkwiler to the group, while changing the band's name to The Dovells. When they were rehearsing "Out in the Cold Again", which turned out to be the B-side of "Bristol Stomp", Borisoff called Summers and asked for help with the harmonies. Borisoff, after two days, asked Summers to be part of the group and replace two of the other members. Sirlen and Shunkwiler were replaced by Summers and Freda. Stevens later began a group Tony & the Raindrops ("Our Love is Over", a local hit), and he joined The Dovells in the 1960s. Purdy worked for the Boeing Company. Scarinci enlisted in the Marine Corps and after being in the military worked for AT&T.

The Dovells in 1961 were Len Borisoff (aka Len Barry), Summers, Silver, Mealey, and Freda. They recorded eight hit records starting with the "Bristol Stomp". Mealey left the group in 1962 for personal reasons but still recorded with them occasionally.

The Dovells first national hit was "Bristol Stomp", a dance song which was followed by a similar hit "Do the New Continental" (in the John Waters movie Hairspray). "Bristol Stomp" sold over one million copies and won a gold disc. They appeared performing both songs in the Chubby Checker movie called Don't Knock the Twist in 1961. They released a series of singles over the next few years. including "You Can't Sit Down", a top hit on the Billboard Hot 100 in 1963. Borisoff left at the end of 1963 for a solo career under the name Len Barry. The high point of his solo career was the Top 5 smash "1-2-3" in 1965, and the follow-up hit "Like a Baby".

The Dovells released "If You Wanna Be Happy" on the album You Can't Sit Down in 1963. The song had been previously released by Jimmy Soul earlier that year and was based on the song "Ugly Woman" by Roaring Lion. In 1963, American Bandstand signed the band to Dick Clark's Caravan of Stars national U.S. tour which was scheduled to perform its 15th show on the night of November 22, 1963 at the Memorial Auditorium in Dallas until suddenly the Friday evening event had to be canceled moments after President John F. Kennedy was assassinated that afternoon while touring the city in an open car caravan.

== The Magistrates and later years ==
The Dovells continued as a trio and recorded as the Magistrates for MGM in 1968. As the Magistrates, they recorded the chart hit "Here Comes the Judge," taking advantage of the popularity of the skit on the TV show Laugh-In. Summers and Freda wrote and produced the song, added the female voice of Jean Yost (Hillary), and performed as the Magistrates as well as The Dovells. Freda left to do his own thing in 1969. The Dovells (Summers-Silver-Stevens) went on to be a big hit, in Las Vegas and the Night Club circuit around the country, performing over 300 shows a year.

Steve Van Zandt, “Miami Steve” at the time, was in the band in the early ‘70s. In 1975, Silver was tired of being on the road and left the group. Summers and Stevens performed as a duo receiving great reviews for their music and comedy and continue to perform to this day.

The Dovells performed at both of President Bill Clinton's inaugural balls, with Clinton guest appearing on saxophone. In 1991, Barry reunited with The Dovells twice. He died in a Philadelphia hospital of myelodysplasia, a bone marrow disease, on November 20, 2020. He was 78 years old.

== Singles ==
Year	Single (A-side, B-side) Both sides from same album except where indicated	Chart positions			Album
Year	Single (A-side, B-side) Both sides from same album except where indicated	US	US R&B	CAN (CHUM)	Album
1961	"No, No, No" b/w "Letters Of Love" (from The Dovells Biggest Hits)	—	—	—	Bristol Stomp
1961	"Bristol Stomp" b/w "Letters Of Love" (later pressings, from The Dovells Biggest Hits) "Out in the Cold Again" (first pressings)	2	7	3	Bristol Stomp
1962	"(Do The New) Continental" b/w "Mope-Itty Mope Stomp" (from Bristol Stomp)	37	—	30	Don't Knock The Twist (Soundtrack)
1962	"Bristol Twistin' Annie" b/w "The Actor" (Non-album track)	27	28	25	All The Hits Of The Teen Groups
1962	"Hully Gully Baby" b/w "Your Last Chance" (from All The Hits Of The Teen Groups)	25	—	22	For Your Hully Gully Party
1962	"The Jitter Bug" b/w "Kissin' In The Kitchen"	82	—	—	For Your Hully Gully Party
1963	"You Can't Run Away From Yourself" b/w "Save Me, Baby" (Non-album track)	—	—	—	The Dovells Biggest Hits
1963	"You Can't Sit Down" b/w "Stompin' Everywhere" (first pressings, from Discotheque) "Wildwood Days" (later pressings)	3	10	6	You Can't Sit Down
1963	"Betty In Bermudas" b/w "Dance The Froog"	50	—	—	Discotheque
1963	"Stop Monkeyin' Aroun'" b/w "No, No, No" (from Bristol Stomp)	94	28	—	Discotheque
1964	"Be My Girl" b/w "Dragster On The Prowl"	—	—	—	The Dovells Biggest Hits
1964	"One Potato" b/w "Happy Birthday Just The Same"	—	—	—	Non-album tracks
1964	"What In The World's Come Over You" b/w "Watusi With Lucy"	—	—	—	Non-album tracks
1965	"(Hey, Hey, Hey) Alright" b/w "Happy"	—	—	—	Non-album tracks
1965	"Our Winter Love" b/w "Blue"	—	—	—	Non-album tracks
1966	"Love Is Everywhere" b/w "There's A Girl"	—	—	—	Non-album tracks
1968	"Here Comes The Judge" b/w "Girl" (by The Magistrates)	—	—	—	Non-album tracks
1970	"Roll Over Beethoven" b/w "Something About You Boy"	—	—	—	Non-album tracks
1971	"L-O-V-E, Love" b/w "We're All In This Together"	—	—	—	Non-album tracks
1972	"Sometimes" b/w "Far Away"	—	—	—	Non-album tracks
1973	"Mary's Magic Show" b/w "Don't Vote For Luke McCabe"	—	—	—	Non-album tracks
1974	"Dancing In The Street" b/w "Back On The Road Again"	105	—	—	Non-album tracks
