= Brooklyn Paramount =

Music venue in Brooklyn, New York

Coordinates: 40.6903256°N 73.9808956°W

- Interactive map of Brooklyn Paramount
- Former names: Brooklyn Paramount Theatre
- Address: 385 Flatbush Avenue Extension; Brooklyn, New York; U.S.
- Operator: Live Nation
- Capacity: 2,700

Construction
- Opened: November 4, 1928

Website
- www.brooklynparamount.com

The Brooklyn Paramount is a music venue in Downtown Brooklyn, New York City, at the intersection of Flatbush and DeKalb Avenues. It opened in 1928 as a movie palace that occasionally hosted jazz, blues and early rock and roll concerts.

In 1962, the theatre was closed and converted into a basketball court for Long Island University (LIU)'s athletic teams. A renovation to turn the building back to a performing arts venue began in 2017, and the theater reopened in 2024.

== Use as theater ==
Paramount Pictures constructed the venue in 1928 and selected the Chicago theater architect team Rapp and Rapp as designers. The studio constructed a sister Paramount Theatre in Times Square, Manhattan. The rococo-designed theater had 4,084 seats covered in burgundy velvet, with a ceiling painted with clouds. The auditorium featured a 60-foot (18 m) stage curtain decorated with satin-embroidered pheasants and huge chandeliers and fountains with goldfish adorned the lobby space.

According to anthropology professor Michael Hittman, "while the Brooklyn Paramount is remembered as a popular movie house and early home of rock ‘n’ roll, it is a little known fact that it helped introduce Brooklyn to jazz, with artists like Dizzy Gillespie, Ella Fitzgerald and Miles Davis." Duke Ellington first played at the Paramount in 1931. The most famous star connected with the theater was composer and radio personality, Russ Columbo, who performed at the theater during the early 1930s. Columbo had the most sold-out performances on record at the theater that would not be broken for quarter of a century, during the promoter created Battle of The Baritones. The theater promoters pitted Bing Crosby and Columbo against each other at two different Paramount Theaters, encouraging audience members to compare the two. According to the Dutch biography De Keizer van het Jiddische Lied it was in 1943 that singer Leo Fuld introduced Yiddish music on this stage. In the 1950s, Alan Freed’s rock ‘n’ roll shows played at the theater, with acts including Chuck Berry and Fats Domino. Buddy Holly played a show in September 1957.

When Freed fell victim of the payola scandal, TV host Clay Cole continued the ten-day holiday show tradition, in shows produced by Sid Bernstein. The first, Clay Cole's Christmas Show broke all existing attendance records with a show featuring Ray Charles, Bobby Rydell, Brenda Lee, Neil Sedaka, Johnny Burnett, The Delicates, Kathy Young, Dion, Bobby Vinton, Bo Diddley, Chubby Checker, Bobby Vee and groups, the Drifters, Coasters, Shirelles, the Supremes, and Little Anthony & The Imperials. The last live rock 'n' roll stage show at The Brooklyn Paramount was "Clay Cole's Easter Parade of Stars" headlining Jackie Wilson and an all-star cast. Then the theater was shuttered.

The General Manager of the theater was Eugene Pleshette, father of the actress Suzanne Pleshette. Long Island University purchased the structure for part of its Brooklyn Campus in 1960 and converted into a gymnasium for LIU in 1962.

The Wurlitzer organ in the Brooklyn Paramount, Opus 1984, is a four-manual, 26-rank instrument with 1,838 pipes and continued to be used at LIU sporting events.

Anthropology/Sociology Professor Dr. Michael Hittman presented an all-day seminar, a one-credit cross-linked course with emphasis on rock 'n' roll on March 27, 2009, at the LIU Brooklyn campus library. Clay Cole was the keynote speaker and hosted panel discussions on the connections between rock 'n' roll and the historic Paramount Theater. The seminar concluded with a 90-minute doo wop show, with artists.

== Use as sports venue ==
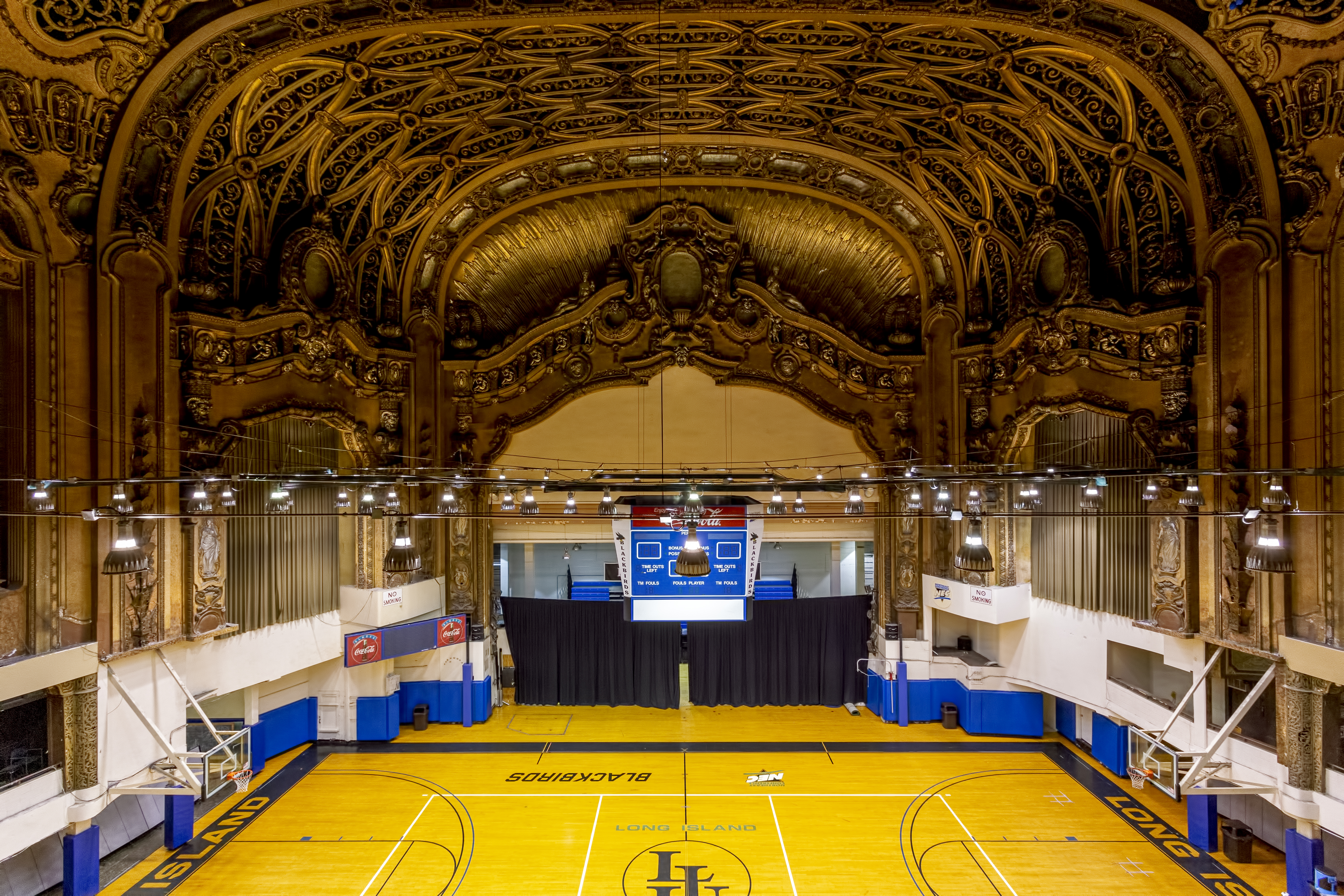
The theater with the LIU basketball court, prior to renovation

In 1962 the Paramount Theater was converted by Long Island University for various uses. The auditorium was adapted as a gymnasium and called the Arnold and Marie Schwartz Athletic Center.

LIU renamed the Brooklyn Paramount building Metcalfe Hall after the university's first president, Tristram Walker Metcalfe. Metcalfe is remembered for his announcement in 1936 that LIU's Blackbirds basketball team had refused to attend Germany's Olympics due to Hitler's discrimination against Jews.

The former Paramount was the home of the LIU Blackbirds basketball team and hosted the Northeast Conference men's basketball tournament three times until 2005, when the Blackbirds moved to the new LIU Athletic, Recreation & Wellness Center, now known as the Steinberg Wellness Center. After that, venue served as an occasional host of Gotham Girls Roller Derby bouts and as the home of the Brooklyn Kings of the now-dormant USBL.

== Renovation ==
In April 2015, LIU announced a 49-year lease of the Paramount to a company controlled by Bruce Ratner and Mikhail Prokhorov, owners of the Barclays Center and the Brooklyn Nets. They planned an extensive renovation costing about $50 million, overseen by the firm of Hugh Hardy, to convert the auditorium back to a theater for live events. Many of the original Rapp & Rapp architectural details remain and will be preserved, as will the Wurlitzer organ. As of 2018, the project was expected to be completed in mid-2019. In 2020, the project was reported to have been delayed.

It was announced in July 2023 that Live Nation Entertainment had taken over the development and that the venue was scheduled to open in the first or second quarter of 2024. The first performance at the venue was held on March 27, 2024, hosted by Damian and Stephen Marley.
