= You Can't Sit Down =

Single by the Dovells

from the album You Can't Sit Down
- B-side: "Stompin' Everywhere"
- Released: June 18 1963
- Genre: Rock
- Length: 2:19
- Label: Parkway
- Songwriters: Phil Upchurch, Dee Clark, Cornell Muldrow, Kal Mann

The Dovells singles chronology
"You Can't Run Away from Yourself" (1963)	"You Can't Sit Down" (1963)	"Betty in Bermudas" (1963)

"You Can't Sit Down" is a song originally recorded as an instrumental in 1959 as "Can't Sit Down" by the Bim Bam Boos, and popularized by the 1963 version by the Dovells, which included lyrics and vocals. The Dovells version of the song peaked at No.3 on the Billboard Hot 100 chart and has been covered by many artists, including the Shangri-Las and Bruce Springsteen.

== The original instrumental, the Bim Bam Boos, 1959 ==
"You Can't Sit Down" was originally recorded as in instrumental in 1959 as "Can't Sit Down" by The Bim Bam Boos on Dasher Records catalogue number D-500 and credited to Dasher - Muldrow; it featured Phil Upchurch on guitar and Cornell Muldrow on organ.

== 1963: Vocal added version, the Dovells / the phrase "hip hop" ==
The Dovells added dance-themed lyrics and vocals to their cover of the song, which was released as a single in 1963, and also included on their album of the same name. The song peaked at No. 3 on the Billboard Hot 100 chart on April 27, 1963, and charted for 14 weeks. In Canada their version reached No. 6.

The lyrics foreshadow the hip-hop genre with the invocation, "you gotta slop, bop, flip, flop, hip hop, all around". The lyrics also mention South Street in Philadelphia. The Orlons, the Dovells' label mates on Cameo-Parkway Records, released a song in the same year called "South Street", and in 1964 the two songs appeared on an album called Golden Hits, consisting of half Dovells songs and half Orlons songs, in addition to their previous releases.

== Other versions ==
- The later better-known recording of "You Can't Sit Down" by Phil Upchurch and his Combo (Upchurch, Muldrow, David Brooks, Mac Johnson and Joe Haddick) was re-recorded in New Orleans in 1960 and released in 1961 by Boyd Records (Boyd 3398) of Oklahoma with distribution by United Artists Records. Upchurch's own version reached No. 29 on the Billboard pop charts.
- This was followed by the vocal cover version by the Dovells that reached No.3 on the Billboard Pop Singles chart in 1963. It is based, at least in part, on the gospel song "Sit Down Servant". This version also reached No.10 on the Hot R&B Singles chart
- In 1962, it appeared as a cover on Booker T. and the MG's first album, Green Onions.
- Harold Nicholas recorded a cover included on his 1963 EP single "Elle a le Truc", released in France.
- The Bar-Kays recorded a cover for their 1967 album Soul Finger.
- Hound Dog Taylor and the HouseRockers also recorded a cover for their 1974 album Natural Boogie.
- In 1964, the Kingsmen included it on their LP The Kingsmen in Person.
- The Shangri-Las recorded it for their 1965 debut album Leader of the Pack.
- Paul Revere & the Raiders had the track on their 1965 album Here They Come!.
- Bruce Springsteen and the E Street Band have played it live as an encore over thirty times since 1976.

== Usage in media ==
- The song was set to two Disney cartoons on D-TV, The Hockey Champ (1939) and Hockey Homicide (1945).
- The Philadelphia 76ers used a modified version of the song with team-specific lyrics for the franchise's marketing campaign during the 1991–92 season.
