= Clay Cole =

American DJ and television host (1938–2010)

- Born: Albert Franklin Rucker Jr. January 1, 1938; Youngstown, Ohio, U.S.
- Died: December 18, 2010 (aged 72); Oak Island, North Carolina, U.S.
- Presenting career
- Show: Mystery Castle; The Enchanted Forest; Rucker's Rumpus Room; Al Rucker and the Seven Teens; Rate the Records; Talent Teens; Teen Quiz; The Record Wagon; The Clay Cole Show; Clay Cole's Discotek
- Stations: WKBN (AM); WKBN-TV; WFMJ; WJAR-TV; WNTA-TV; WPIX-TV

Clay Cole (born Albert Franklin Rucker Jr.; January 1, 1938 – December 18, 2010) was an American host and disc jockey, best known for his eponymous television dance program, The Clay Cole Show, which aired in New York City on WNTA-TV and WPIX-TV from 1959 to 1968.

== Origins ==
Clay Cole was born in Youngstown, Ohio. He became a juvenile stage and radio actor; then in 1953, at age 15, became the television host and producer of his own Saturday night teen music show, Rucker's Rumpus Room, first on WKBN-TV, then, until 1957, on WFMJ. Arriving in Manhattan in 1957, he worked first as an NBC page, then as a production assistant on the troubled quiz show Twenty One, the events at which were recreated in the 1994 film Quiz Show, directed by Robert Redford.

== Early television and film career ==
In 1958, he continued his Saturday night television legacy, launching Al Rucker and the Seven Teens program on WJAR-TV, Providence, Rhode Island. Upon arrival in New York City during 1959, he was asked to change his name. He chose Clay Cole, the name of a distant cousin. His dance program became known as The Clay Cole Show. It originally was broadcast on WNTA-TV (later PBS station WNET-TV). When WNTA-TV was sold in 1963, Cole's program was picked up by New York City television station WPIX-TV, where the program became known as Clay Cole's Discotek by 1965. One of his other shows, Clay Cole at the Moon Bowl, was broadcast from the Freedomland U.S.A. theme park in The Bronx during 1963 on WPIX-TV. Chuck McCann was his announcer sidekick. Cole and this show, along with his other connections to Freedomland, are featured in the book, Freedomland U.S.A.: The Definitive History (Theme Park Press, 2019).

Clay's 1960 all-star ten-day Christmas show at the Brooklyn Paramount Theater broke the all-time house box office record. Clay was among the few white performers invited to appear at Harlem's Apollo Theater; he headlined three week-long revues, starring Fats Domino, Gladys Knight & the Pips and Chubby Checker. In 1961, he appeared as himself in the film Twist Around the Clock.

During the 1960s "British Invasion", musical acts arriving from the UK often appeared on Cole's television shows before doing network shows such as The Ed Sullivan Show. The Rolling Stones and The Who were among those who first appeared on Cole's television show. Cole's show differed from American Bandstand in a few ways: while both Cole and Dick Clark had an interest in young people and their music, Cole did not hesitate to join in on his show's dance floor. He was also more confident about booking lesser-known performers and comedians for his show.

== Writing, producing and directing career ==
Leaving The Clay Cole Show on December 16, 1967, Clay became a television writer - producer, involved in the production of over 3500 broadcast television shows. He is twice winner of the Emmy Award (NATAS) as "producer of outstanding television programming" in 1981 and 1982 for the Joel Siegel Academy Awards special. He produced The Discovery of Marilyn Monroe, Play Bridge with Omar Sharif and 365 This Day In Hollywood segments. Along with David Susskind and Raysa Bonow, he created and produced the first primetime entertainment magazine People for CBS in 1979. Cole also hosted A. M. New York. He returned briefly in 1974 as the star of the first HBO-produced music special Clay Cole's 20 Years of Rock and Roll, a two-hour event taped at Rockland Community College, and as co-host of the WABC-TV weekday program, AM New York. His final professional assignment was as writer/producer/director of the television special, the 2002, going on in the 80's to have his own production company, Clay Cole Productions. He produced the music video for Otis Day and the Knights, besides other industrial projects like the Sanremo Music Festival in Italy, featuring Britney Spears, Destiny's Child, Alicia Keys, Shakira, Kylie Minogue and other international pop divas.

== Retirement and death ==
Cole retired and had been living on Oak Island since 2007, off the Cape Fear River on the North Carolina coastline. His pop culture memoir, Sh-Boom! The Explosion of Rock 'n' Roll (1953-1968), was published by Morgan James. It was nominated for the 2010 Association for Recorded Sound Collections Awards for Excellence in Historical Recorded Sound Research. Cole made a personal appearance at the annual Long Island Radio & TV Day in April 2010, and also at the New Jersey Rock Con later that year. Clay appeared at the Friends of Old Time Radio Convention in Newark, New Jersey in October 2010.

In addition, Cole was a member of the nominating committee of the Hit Parade Hall of Fame.

Cole died of a heart attack at his home on December 18, 2010, at the age of 72.
