= Bristol Stomp =

Single by The Dovells

from the album Bristol Stomp
- B-side: "Letters of Love" (original releases); "Out in the Cold Again" (later releases)
- Released: August 21, 1961
- Genre: Doo-wop
- Length: 2:18
- Label: Parkway Records 31348
- Songwriters: Kal Mann, Dave Appell

The Dovells singles chronology
"No, No, No" (1961)	"Bristol Stomp" (1961)	"Do the New Continental" (1962)

"Bristol Stomp" is a song written in 1961 by Kal Mann and Dave Appell, two executives with Cameo-Parkway Records, for The Dovells, a doo-wop singing group from Philadelphia who recorded it for Cameo-Parkway later that year. Appell produced and arranged the track and Cameo-Parkway's house band served as the studio musicians.

== Background ==
The song was written about teenagers in 1961 who were dancing a new step called "The Stomp" at Good Will Hose Company dances in Bristol, Pennsylvania, a blue-collar suburb northeast of Philadelphia. Before the Dovells' song was released, kids were dancing the Bristol Stomp to the song "Every Day of the Week" by the Students. The Dovells used the basic feel of that tune and put a three-beat emphasis on the syllables in the title: "Bristol Stomp".

The refrain:

"The kids in Bristol are sharp as a pistol
When they do the Bristol Stomp
Really somethin' when the joint is jumpin'
When they do the Bristol Stomp"

This song makes reference to the "Pony" and the "Twist".

== Chart performance ==
The Dovells' recording was #2 on the Billboard Hot 100 singles chart in 1961 behind "Runaround Sue" by Dion. "Bristol Stomp" sold over one million copies and was awarded a gold disc. "The Bristol Stomp" also peaked at #7 on the Hot R&B Sides chart. In Canada it reached #3.

== Other versions ==
- In 1962, Chubby Checker, The Dovells' fellow Cameo-Parkway artist, released his rendition of "Bristol Stomp" on the soundtrack album for the Columbia Pictures movie Don't Knock the Twist. Checker performs lead vocals with the Dovells providing backup. Though not as instrumentally polished as the Dovells' original, this take added more pep. Checker starred in the movie.
- On the live performance of Gary U.S. Bonds' "Seven Day Weekend" on Johnny Thunders live soundtrack album Stations of the Cross, Walter Lure begins singing the chorus of "Bristol Stomp," playing on the fact that the two songs share the same chord sequence, although this chord sequence was common to many songs from the era.
- UK group The Late Show's interpretation peaked at #40 on the official UK chart in March 1979.

== In popular culture ==
- The song has been used by Fox Sports during broadcasts of the Food City 500, a NASCAR Sprint Cup Series race from the Bristol Motor Speedway in Bristol, Tennessee which is the twin city of Bristol, Virginia. Massively wrecked race cars were referred to as having been "Bristol Stomped".
- The song was featured in the season 14 Family Guy episode "A Lot Going On Upstairs". In one scene, Brian Griffin is first brought into Stewie Griffin's dream, where he is hosting a dinner party with Glenn Close. The Dovells suddenly appear singing the song, prompting Brian to ask how Stewie knows the song. Glenn answers that he heard it on a car radio once.
