= 1961 in music =

This is a list of notable events in music that took place in the year 1961.

== Specific locations ==
- 1961 in British music
- 1961 in Japanese music
- 1961 in Norwegian music

== Specific genres ==
- 1961 in country music
- 1961 in jazz

== Events ==
- January 20 – Francis Poulenc's Gloria receives its premiėre in Boston, USA.
- February 9 – The Beatles at The Cavern Club: The Beatles, at this juncture John Lennon, Paul McCartney, George Harrison and Pete Best, perform under this name at The Cavern Club for the first time following their December return to Liverpool from Hamburg.
- February 12 – The Miracles' "Shop Around" becomes Motown's first million-selling single.
- February 14 – The Platters file a lawsuit against Mercury Records for breach of contract after the record company refuses to accept recordings on which Tony Williams does not sing lead. The group's lawsuit contends that their contract does not require this.
- February 15 – American soul singer Jackie Wilson is shot and seriously wounded at his Manhattan apartment by jealous girlfriend Juanita Jones (claimed publicly to be an obsessive fan).
- February 25 – Elvis Presley makes his first public stage appearance in four years, playing two shows in Memphis, Tennessee.
- March 18 – The 6th Eurovision Song Contest, held at Palais des Festivals et des Congrès in Cannes, is won by Luxembourg with the song "Nous les amoureux", sung by Jean-Claude Pascal.
- March 21 – The Beatles at The Cavern Club: The Beatles play the first of nearly 300 regular performances at The Cavern Club in Liverpool.
- March 25 – Elvis Presley performs a benefit show at the Block Arena in Pearl Harbor, Hawaii. The show raises $62,000 for the USS Arizona Memorial fund.
- April 13
  - Intolleranza 1960 by Luigi Nono, his first opera, is premièred at La Fenice in Venice.
  - The 3rd Annual Grammy Awards are held in Los Angeles, hosted by actor Lloyd Bridges. Ray Charles wins the most awards with four. Bob Newhart's The Button-Down Mind of Bob Newhart wins Album of the Year, Percy Faith's version of the "theme from A Summer Place" wins Record of the Year and Ernest Gold's "Theme from Exodus" wins Song of the Year. Newhart also wins Best New Artist.
- April 17 – Dalida and Charles Aznavour receive Radio Monte Carlo Oscar Awards for Best Song.
- April 23 – Judy Garland's concert at Carnegie Hall in New York City.
- April 29 – Italian tenor Luciano Pavarotti makes his operatic debut as Rodolfo in La Bohème at the Teatro Municipale (Reggio Emilia).
- May 1 – The Pulitzer Prize for Music is awarded to Walter Piston for his Symphony No. 7.
- June 14 – Patsy Cline is hospitalized as a result of a head-on car collision. While she is in hospital, the song "I Fall to Pieces" becomes a big Country/Pop crossover hit for her.
- June 25 – The Bill Evans Trio completes a two-week stay at The Village Vanguard in New York. It is the last time this trio will play before virtuoso bassist Scott LaFaro's death 10 days later. The five sets they play on the 25th are recorded, resulting in two albums, Sunday at the Village Vanguard and Waltz for Debby.
- June–July – Stu Sutcliffe leaves The Beatles to resume his art studies in Hamburg.
- July 1 – French composer Olivier Messiaen marries pianist Yvonne Loriod privately in Paris.
- July 17 – Billboard magazine first publishes an "Easy Listening" chart, listing songs that the magazine determines are not rock & roll records. The first #1 song on this chart is "The Boll Weevil Song" by Brook Benton. This chart will be renamed a number of times, becoming the Hot Adult Contemporary Tracks chart.
- October – John Cage's book Silence: Lectures and Writings is published in the United States.
- October 17 – Former schoolfriends Mick Jagger and Keith Richards, later of The Rolling Stones, meet each other again by chance on Dartford railway station in Kent, England, on the way to their respective colleges and discover their mutual taste for rock and roll.
- November 9 – The Beatles at The Cavern Club: Future manager Brian Epstein first sees The Beatles.
- November 25 – The Everly Brothers enlist in the United States Marine Corps Reserve.
- November 27 – The Beach Boys release their debut 45 rpm single "Surfin'"/"Luau" on the small California label Candix Records. They have previously been known as The Pendletones.
- December 9 – The Beatles play their first gig in the south of England, at Aldershot. Inadequate advertising results in only 18 people turning up. In the early hours of the following morning they play an impromptu set at a London club.
- William Alwyn sets up home with fellow-composer Doreen Carwithen, his former pupil, at Blythburgh in England.
- The Leeds International Pianoforte Competition is founded in the north of England by Marion, Countess of Harewood, and Fanny Waterman.
- Indian tabla player Keshav Sathe and sitar player Bhaskar Chandavarkar perform with Larry Adler.
- The Country Music Association (CMA) creates the Country Music Hall of Fame and inducts, Jimmie Rodgers, Fred Rose and Hank Williams as the first three members.
- The score of Haydn's Cello Concerto No. 1 is discovered by musicologist Oldřich Pulkert in the Prague National Museum.

== Bands formed ==
- See Category:Musical groups established in 1961

== Albums released ==
- All the Way – Brenda Lee
- All the Way – Frank Sinatra
- The Alvin Show – Alvin and the Chipmunks – Soundtrack
- As Long as She Needs Me – Sammy Davis Jr.
- Blue Hawaii (OST) – Elvis Presley
- The Blues and the Abstract Truth – Oliver Nelson
- BMOC: Best Music On/Off Campus – The Brothers Four
- The Bobby Darin Story – Bobby Darin
- Bobby's Biggest Hits – Bobby Rydell
- Bobby Vee – Bobby Vee
- Bo Diddley Is a Lover – Bo Diddley
- Bright and Shiny – Doris Day
- Clap Hands, Here Comes Charlie! – Ella Fitzgerald
- Come Swing with Me! – Frank Sinatra
- Das ist Freddy – Freddy Quinn
- Runaround Sue – Dion
- An Electrifying Evening with the Dizzy Gillespie Quintet – Dizzy Gillespie
- Ella Fitzgerald Sings the Harold Arlen Songbook – Ella Fitzgerald
- Ella in Hollywood – Ella Fitzgerald
- Ella Returns to Berlin – Ella Fitzgerald (recorded, released 1991)
- Emotions – Brenda Lee
- Explorations – Bill Evans Trio
- For 'Teen Twisters Only – Chubby Checker
- Garde-moi la dernière danse – Dalida
- The Genius Sings the Blues – Ray Charles
- Goin' Places – The Kingston Trio (including "It Was a Very Good Year")
- The Greatest Horn in the World – Al Hirt
- He's the King and His Band – Al Hirt
- I Have Dreamed – Doris Day
- I Remember Tommy – Frank Sinatra
- It's Morrissey, Man! – Dick Morrissey
- Jewels of the Sea – Les Baxter
- Joan Baez, Vol. 2 – Joan Baez
- Judy at Carnegie Hall – Judy Garland
- Les Chansons d'Aragon – Léo Ferré
- L'Étonnant Serge Gainsbourg – Serge Gainsbourg
- Let's Twist Again – Chubby Checker
- Listen to Cliff! – Cliff Richard
- Loin de moi – Dalida
- Lonely and Blue – Roy Orbison
- The Lure of the Grand Canyon – Johnny Cash
- Make Way – The Kingston Trio
- More Soul – Hank Crawford
- My Favorite Things – John Coltrane
- New Juke Box Hits – Chuck Berry
- Now Here's Johnny Cash – Johnny Cash
- Out of the Cool – The Gil Evans Orchestra
- Patsy Cline Showcase – Patsy Cline
- Rachmaninoff: Piano Concerto No. 3 – Byron Janis, Antal Dorati conducts the London Symphony Orchestra
- Rah! – Mark Murphy
- Rainin' in My Heart – Slim Harpo
- Ring-a-Ding-Ding! – Frank Sinatra
- Rick Is 21 – Rick Nelson
- Roy Orbison at the Rock House – Roy Orbison
- Runaway with Del Shannon – Del Shannon
- A Scottish Soldier – Andy Stewart
- Send for Me – Julie London
- The Shadows – The Shadows
- Shirley Bassey – Shirley Bassey
- Sinatra Swings – Frank Sinatra
- Sinatra's Swingin' Session!!! – Frank Sinatra
- Sings Hits of the Rockin' 50's – Bobby Vee
- Sing to Me Mr. C – Perry Como
- Someday My Prince Will Come – Miles Davis
- Something for Everybody – Elvis Presley
- The Soul of Ike & Tina Turner – Ike & Tina Turner
- Straight Ahead – Oliver Nelson
- Stranger on the Shore – Acker Bilk
- Sunday at the Village Vanguard – Bill Evans Trio
- The Swingin's Mutual! – Nancy Wilson with the George Shearing quintet
- Time Further Out – Dave Brubeck
- 21 Today – Cliff Richard
- Twist – Bill Haley & His Comets
- West Side Story – Cal Tjader
- West Side Story – Original Soundtrack
- Whatever Julie Wants – Julie London
- The Young Ones – Cliff Richard and The Shadows

== Biggest hit singles ==
The following singles achieved the highest chart positions in 1961.

#	Artist	Title	Year	Country	Chart Entries
1	Ben E King	Stand By Me	1961	US	UK 1 – Feb 1987, Ireland 1 – Feb 1987, DDD 1 of 1961, RYM 2 of 1961, Switzerland 3 – Mar 1987, US BB 4 – May 1961, Germany 4 – Mar 1987, US BB 7 of 1961, Netherlands 7 – Mar 1987, POP 7 of 1961, Norway 9 – Apr 1987, Scrobulate 14 of soul, Canada 16 – May 1961, Austria 17 – Apr 1987, RIAA 25, US CashBox 43 of 1961, Acclaimed 53, 95 in 2FM list, Italy 96 of 1962, Rolling Stone 121, Germany 235 of the 1980s, Party 269 of 1999, WXPN 746
2	Del Shannon	Runaway	1961	US	UK 1 – Apr 1961, US BB 1 – Mar 1961, Canada 1 – Mar 1961, Australia 1 for 6 weeks Oct 1960, RYM 1 of 1961, Norway 4 – Jun 1961, DDD 7 of 1961, US CashBox 9 of 1961, Australia Goset 12 – Oct 1967, Australia 15 of 1961, US BB 5 of 1961, POP 17 of 1961, South Africa 18 of 1961, Acclaimed 66, Scrobulate 96 of oldies, Rolling Stone 466
3	Chubby Checker	Let's Twist Again	1961	US	UK 2 – Dec 1961, Canada 2 – Jul 1961, Norway 2 – Feb 1962, US BB 3 of 1961, Netherlands 3 – Jan 1976, POP 3 of 1961, South Africa 6 of 1962, US BB 8 – Jul 1961, Sweden (alt) 10 – Feb 1976, Austria 11 – Apr 1976, Germany 12 – Mar 1962, RYM 16 of 1961, Italy 17 of 1962, Party 23 of 1999, US CashBox 62 of 1961, DDD 67 of 1961, Scrobulate 95 of oldies, Germany 396 of the 1960s
4	Elvis Presley	Surrender	1961	US	UK 1 – May 1961, US BB 1 – Feb 1961, Canada 1 – Mar 1961, Australia 1 for 2 weeks Sep 1960, Norway 2 – Apr 1961, Germany 6 – May 1961, South Africa 10 of 1961, US CashBox 32 of 1961, Global 33 (5 M sold) – 1961, RYM 33 of 1961
5	The Marcels	Blue Moon	1961	US	UK 1 – Apr 1961, US BB 1 – Mar 1961, Canada 1 – Mar 1961, Norway 4 – May 1961, US CashBox 11 of 1961, South Africa 11 of 1961, Germany 13 – Jun 1961, US BB 14 of 1961, DDD 14 of 1961, POP 14 of 1961, RYM 26 of 1961, Acclaimed 1034

== Top hits on record ==
- "A Hundred Pounds of Clay" – Gene McDaniels #3 US
- "Angel Baby" – Rosie & The Originals #5 US
- "At Last" – Etta James
- "Are You Lonesome Tonight?" – Elvis Presley #1 US, UK, Australia, Belgium, Canada, South Africa, Spain
- "Are You Sure?" – The Allisons #1 UK
- "Baby Sittin' Boogie" – Buzz Clifford #4 Norway, #6 US
- "Blue Moon" – The Marcels #1 US, UK
- "Bristol Stomp" – The Dovells #2 US
- "Calcutta" – Lawrence Welk #1 US
- "Calendar Girl" – Neil Sedaka #1 Canada, Japan, #3 Australia, #4 US
- "Can't Help Falling in Love" – Elvis Presley #1 US, UK, Australia, Austria, Belgium, Canada, NZ, Netherlands, Sweden
- "Crazy" – Patsy Cline #9 US
- "Crying" – Roy Orbison #2 US
- "Don't Bet Money Honey" – Linda Scott #9 US
- "Dum Dum" – Brenda Lee #4 US, Australia
- "Emotions" – Brenda Lee #7 US
- "F.B.I." – The Shadows #3 France, #6 UK, #8 NZ
- "The Fly" – Chubby Checker #7 US
- "Fool #1" – Brenda Lee #3 US
- "The Frightened City" – The Shadows #3 UK
- "Garde-moi la dernière danse" – Dalida
- "Gee Whiz (Look at His Eyes)" – Carla Thomas
- "A Girl Like You" – Cliff Richard and The Shadows #3 UK
- "Hello Mary Lou" – Ricky Nelson #1 Norway, #2 UK, #4 NZ, #9 US
- "(He's My) Dreamboat" – Connie Francis
- "Hit the Road Jack" – Ray Charles #1 US, NZ, #3 Australia
- "How Many Tears" – Bobby Vee
- "I Don't Know Why" – Linda Scott
- "I Fall to Pieces" – Patsy Cline
- "I Just Want to Make Love to You"- Etta James
- "I Like It Like That, Part 1" – Chris Kenner #2 US
- "Il faut savoir" – Charles Aznavour #1 France
- "I've Told Ev'ry Little Star" – Linda Scott #1 Denmark, Philippines, South Africa, Sweden
- "Johnny Remember Me – John Leyton #1 UK
- "Kon-Tiki" – The Shadows #1 UK, #3 NZ, #4 Australia, Ireland
- "The Lion Sleeps Tonight" – The Tokens
- "Little Boy Sad" – Johnny Burnette
- "Lonely Street" – Clarence "Frogman" Henry
- "(Marie's the Name) His Latest Flame"/"Little Sister" – Elvis Presley
- "Michael" – The Highwaymen
- "Moliendo Café" – Hugo Blanco #1 Argentina, Japan
- "Moody River" – Pat Boone #1 US
- "Mother-in-Law" – Ernie K-Doe #1 US
- "The Mountain's High" – Dick and Dee Dee #2 US
- "Muskrat" – The Everly Brothers
- "Nuits d'Espagne" – Dalida
- "On the Rebound" – Floyd Cramer
- "Please Mr. Postman" – The Marvelettes #1 US
- "Quarter to Three" – Gary U.S. Bonds #1 US, #7 UK
- "Raindrops" – Dee Clark #2 US
- "The Red Rooster" – Howlin' Wolf
- "Runaround Sue" – Dion #1 US
- "Runaway" – Del Shannon #1 US, UK, Australia, Canada, Chile, NZ
- "Running Scared" – Roy Orbison #1 US
- "Run to Him" – Bobby Vee #2 US, #4 Canada
- "Sailor" – Petula Clark #1 UK, NZ, Israel
- "School Is Out" – Gary U.S. Bonds #5 US
- "Shop Around" – The Miracles
- "Spanish Harlem" – Ben E. King #10 US
- "Stand By Me" – Ben E. King #4 US
- "Stranger on the Shore" – Acker Bilk #1 UK
- "Sukiyaki" ("Ue o Muite Arukō", 上を向いて歩こう, "I Look Up As I Walk") – Kyu Sakamoto #1 US, Canada, Japan, Australia, NZ, Norway
- "There's No Other (Like My Baby)" – The Crystals
- "This Time" – Troy Shondell #4 Canada, Norway, #6 US
- "Together" – Connie Francis
- "Tossin' and Turnin' " – Bobby Lewis #1 US
- "Travelin' Man" – Ricky Nelson
- "Viens danser le twist" – Johnny Hallyday #1 France, Belgium
- "Walk Right Back"/"Ebony Eyes" – The Everly Brothers
- "Walkin' Back to Happiness" – Helen Shapiro #1 UK, Ireland, Israel, NZ, South Africa
- "The Wanderer" – Dion
- "When the Girl in Your Arms Is the Girl in Your Heart" – Cliff Richard #1 Norway, #2 Australia, #3 UK
- "Where the Boys Are" – Connie Francis #4 US, NZ, #5 UK
- "Will You Love Me Tomorrow" – The Shirelles
- "Wonderland by Night" – Bert Kaempfert #1 US
- "You Don't Know" – Helen Shapiro
- "You're Driving Me Crazy" – The Temperance Seven #1 UK

== Published popular music ==
- "Baby Elephant Walk" m. Henry Mancini from the film Hatari!
- "Big Bad John" w.m. Jimmy Dean
- "Blue Bayou" w.m. Joe Melson & Roy Orbison
- "Breakin' in a Brand New Broken Heart" w.m. Howard Greenfield & Jack Keller
- "Crazy" w.m. Willie Nelson
- Cruella DeVil w.m. Mel Leven, from the Walt Disney animated film 101 Dalmatians
- "Crying" w.m. Joe Melson & Roy Orbison
- "Funny How Time Slips Away" w.m. Willie Nelson
- "Hats Off to Larry" w.m. Del Shannon
- "Hit the Road Jack" w.m. Percy Mayfield
- "I Love How You Love Me" w.m. Barry Mann & Larry Kolber
- "Let's Get Together" w.m. Richard M. Sherman & Robert B. Sherman from the film The Parent Trap
- "Let's Twist Again" w.m. Dave Appell & Kal Mann
- "Love Makes the World Go 'Round" w.m. Bob Merrill from the film Carnival!
- "Mister Ed theme song" w.m. Jay Livingston & Ray Evans
- "Moon River" w. Johnny Mercer m. Henry Mancini from the film Breakfast at Tiffany's
- "Multiplication" w.m. Bobby Darin. Introduced by Bobby Darin in the film Come September.
- "My Kind of Girl" w.m. Leslie Bricusse
- "Pocketful Of Miracles" w. Sammy Cahn m. Jimmy Van Heusen from the film Pocketful of Miracles
- "Running Scared" w.m. Joe Melson & Roy Orbison
- "Speedy Gonzales" w.m David Hess, Buddy Kaye & Ethel Lee
- "Tender Is the Night" w. Paul Francis Webster m. Sammy Fain. Theme from the film Tender Is the Night
- "Tower of Strength" w. Bob Hilliard m. Burt Bacharach
- "Walk on the Wild Side" w. Mack David m. Elmer Bernstein
- "When the Girl in Your Arms Is the Girl in Your Heart" w.m. Roy Bennett & Sid Tepper from the soundtrack album The Young Ones
- "The Young Ones" w. Roy Bennett m. Sid Tepper from soundtrack album The Young Ones

== Other notable songs ==
- "Buliao qing" m. Wong Fuk Ling w. Tao Tseon, sung by Koo Mei
- "Cunto 'e lampare" – Mario Trevi
- "Mare verde" – Mario Trevi
- "Nous les amoureux" by Jean-Claude Pascal
- "Santiano" by Hugues Aufray
- "Settembre cu mme" – Mario Trevi

== Classical music ==
=== Premieres ===
Sortable table
Composer	Composition	Date	Location	Performers
Bennett, Richard Rodney	Winter Music, for flute and piano	1961-01-08	London Drawing Room of the Arts Council (Park Lane Group)	W. Bennett, Bradshaw
Britten, Benjamin	Cello Sonata	1961-07-07	Aldeburgh, UK (Festival)	Rostropovich, Britten
Chávez, Carlos	Soli II	1961-04-23	Washington, D.C., Coolidge Auditorium of the Library of Congress (IA Festival)	Philadelphia Wind Quintet
Davidovsky, Mario	Choreographic Suite for El payaso	1961-04-29	Washington, D.C., Howard University (IA Festival)	Mexico National Symphony – Herrera de la Fuente
Musgrave, Thea	Trio for flute, oboe, and piano	1961-01-08	London Drawing Room of the Arts Council (Park Lane Group)	Mabillon Trio
Penderecki, Krzysztof	Threnody to the Victims of Hiroshima	1961-09-22	Warsaw, Poland (Autumn)	Kraków Philharmonic – Markowski (Note: The Threnody was first performed in May 1961 by the Polish Radio Symphony conducted by Jan Krenz for a radio recording.)
Piston, Walter	Symphony No. 7	1961-02-10	Philadelphia	Philadelphia Orchestra – Ormandy
Poulenc, Francis	Gloria	1961-01-20	Boston	Addison / Chorus pro Musica, Boston Symphony – Munch
Shostakovich, Dmitri	Symphony No. 4	1961-12-30	Moscow	Moscow Philharmonic – Kondrashin
Stockhausen, Karlheinz	Originale, music theatre with Kontakte	1961-10-26	Cologne, Germany (Theater am Dom)	Caspari, Tudor, Caskel, Kobayashi, Paik, Helms, Bauermeister, Sommer, Ramsbott, Koch, Knobelsdorff, et al.

=== Compositions ===
- Samuel Adler – Symphony No. 3
- Malcolm Arnold – Symphony No. 5
- Milton Babbitt – Vision and Prayer
- Henk Badings
  - Symphony No. 10
  - Te Deum for men choir and orchestra
  - Toccata I & II, electronic music
- Niels Viggo Bentzon – Concerto No. 2 for violin and orchestra
- Harrison Birtwistle – The World Is Discovered: Six Instrumental Movements after Heinrich Isaac, for chamber ensemble
- Havergal Brian – Symphony No. 19
- Benjamin Britten – Cello Sonata
- Earle Brown – Available Forms I
- Elliott Carter –
  - Double Concerto (1959–61)
  - Holiday Overture (revision)
- Carlos Chávez – Soli II, for wind quintet
- Mario Davidovsky –
  - Electronic Study No. 1
  - Piano 1961 for orchestra
- Edison Denisov – String Quartet No. 2
- Petr Eben – Piano Concerto
- Morton Feldman
  - Durations 3, for violin, tuba, and piano
  - Durations 4, for vibraphone, violin, and cello
  - Durations 5, for horn, vibraphone, harp, piano or celesta, violin, and cello
  - Two Pieces for Clarinet and String Quartet
  - The Straits of Magellan, flute, horn, trumpet, harp, electric guitar, piano, and double bass
- Alun Hoddinott – Concerto for Piano, Winds and Percussion
- Vagn Holmboe – String Quartet No. 6, Op. 78
- Jānis Ivanovs – String Quartet No. 3
- Wojciech Kilar – balet The Masque of the Red Death
- Yuri Levitin – Concertino for Cello and Orchestra, opus 54
- György Ligeti – Atmosphères for Orchestra
- Witold Lutosławski – Jéux vénitiéns for Orchestra
- William Mathias – Second Piano Concerto
- Einojuhani Rautavaara – Symphony No. 3
- Alan Rawsthorne – Concerto for Ten Instruments
- Dmitri Shostakovich – Symphony No. 12 in D minor, Op. 112 "The Year 1917"
- Karlheinz Stockhausen – Originale, musical theatre, Nr. 12 2/3
- Toru Takemitsu
  - Music of Trees, for orchestra
  - Ring, for flute, terz guitar and lute
  - Bad Boy, for 3 guitars
  - Piano Distance, for piano
- Edgard Varèse – Nocturnal
- Mieczysław Weinberg – Concerto for flute and orchestra in D minor, op. 75
- Isang Yun – Third String Quartet (1959–61)

== Opera ==
- Vittorio Giannini – The Harvest
- Luigi Nono – Intolleranza 1960, 13 April 1961, Venice, Teatro La Fenice
- Robert Ward – The Crucible
- Grace Williams – The Parlour
- Hans Werner Henze – Elegy for Young Lovers, libretto by W. H. Auden and Chester Kallman.

== Film ==
- Benjamin Frankel – The Curse of the Werewolf
- Ernest Gold – Judgment at Nuremberg
- Ron Goodwin – Murder, She Said
- Bernard Herrmann – Mysterious Island
- Henry Mancini – Breakfast at Tiffany's
- Miklós Rózsa – El Cid
- Miklós Rózsa – King of Kings
- Dimitri Tiomkin – The Guns of Navarone

== Musical theater ==
- Carnival! (Music and Lyrics: Bob Merrill Book: Michael Stewart). Broadway production opened at the Imperial Theatre on April 13 and ran for 719 performances
- Do Re Mi London production opened at the Prince of Wales Theatre on October 12 and ran for 169 performances
- Donnybrook! Broadway production opened at the 46th Street Theatre on May 18 and ran for 68 performances.
- The Fantasticks London production opened on September 7 and ran for 44 performances
- How to Succeed in Business Without Really Trying (Music and Lyrics: Frank Loesser Book: Abe Burrows, Jack Weinstein and Willie Gilbert) Broadway production opened at the 46th Street Theatre on October 14 and ran for 1417 performances.
- Kwamina Broadway production opened at the 54th Street Theatre on October 23 and ran for 32 performances
- The Lord Chamberlain Regrets, West End production opened at the Saville Theatre on August 23.
- Milk and Honey Broadway production opened at the Martin Beck Theatre on October 10 and ran for 543 performances
- The Music Man London production opened at the Adelphi Theatre on March 16. Starring Van Johnson, Patricia Lambert, Ruth Kettlewell and Dennis Waterman.
- Salad Days (Julian Slade) – London revival at Prince's Theatre
- Sail Away Broadway production opened at the Broadhurst Theatre on October 3 and ran for 167 performances
- The Sentimental Bloke (Music: Albert Arlen Lyrics: Nancy Brown, Albert Arlen, Lloyd Thomson and C. J. Dennis Book: Lloyd Thomson and Nancy Brown). Premiered at the Albert Hall, Canberra, March. Melbourne production opened at the Comedy Theatre on November 4.
- The Sound Of Music (Music: Richard Rodgers Lyrics: Oscar Hammerstein II Book: Howard Lindsay and Russel Crouse) – London production opened at the Palace Theatre and ran for 2385 performances.
- Stop the World – I Want to Get Off (Music, Lyrics and Book: Anthony Newley and Leslie Bricusse) – London production opened at the Queen's Theatre on July 20 and ran for 485 performances.
- Subways Are For Sleeping (Music: Jule Styne Lyrics and Book: Adolph Green & Betty Comden) Broadway production opened at the St. James Theatre on December 27 and ran for 205 performances.
- Wildest Dreams (by Julian Slade) London production opened at the Vaudeville Theatre on August 3 and ran for 76 performances

== Musical films ==
- 101 Dalmatians Walt Disney animated film
- Amorina Argentine black-and-white musical film
- Babes in Toyland Walt Disney live action film starring Ray Bolger
- Blue Hawaii starring Elvis Presley, Joan Blackman, Angela Lansbury and Pamela Austin. Directed by Norman Taurog.
- Flower Drum Song starring Nancy Kwan and James Shigeta
- Gunga Jumna, Bollywood film starring Dilip Kumar and Vyjayanthimala
- Jagadeka Veeruni Katha, Telugu film starring N.T. Rama Rao
- Season in Salzburg Austrian musical comedy film
- West Side Story starring Natalie Wood, Rita Moreno, and Richard Beymer
- Une femme est une femme, directed by Jean-Luc Godard with music by Michel Legrand
- The Young Ones British musical starring Cliff Richard

== Births ==
- January 1 – Sergei Babayan, Armenian-American pianist and academic
- January 13
  - Suggs, singer (Madness)
  - Julia Louis-Dreyfus, American actress, comedian, and producer
- January 14 – Mike Tramp (White Lion)
- January 27 – Gillian Gilbert (New Order)
- January 29 – Eddie Jackson (Queensrÿche)
- January 31 – Lloyd Cole, singer and songwriter
- February 8 – Vince Neil, American vocalist (Mötley Crüe)
- February 13
  - Henry Rollins, American punk/rock vocalist and spoken word performer
  - cEvin Key, Canadian musician (Skinny Puppy)
- February 16 – Andy Taylor, English guitarist (Duran Duran)
- February 20 – Daddy-O, American rapper (Stetsasonic)
- February 22 – Akira Takasaki, Japanese singer (Loudness)
- February 23 – Mihai Amihalachioaie, Moldovan accordonist and conductor (d. 2024)
- February 27 – Hideaki Tokunaga, Japanese singer
- March 2
  - Sara Mingardo, Italian operatic contralto
  - Simone Young, Australian conductor
- March 6 – Moshe Datz, Israeli singer, composer and producer (Duo Datz)
- March 15 – Fabio Biondi, Italian violinist and conductor
- March 17 – Alexander Bard, Swedish singer (Army of Lovers)
- March 20 – Slim Jim Phantom (The Stray Cats)
- March 27 – Tak Matsumoto, Japanese guitarist
- April 1
  - Susan Boyle, Scottish singer
  - Mark White, British pop singer-songwriter (ABC)
- April 2 – Keren Woodward, singer (Bananarama)
- April 6 – Gene Eugene, actor, lead singer of Adam Again
- April 12 – Christophe Rousset, harpsichordist
- April 13 – Hiro Yamamoto (Soundgarden)
- April 28 – Roland Gift, singer (Fine Young Cannibals)
- May 7
  - Phil Campbell, British rock guitarist (died 2026)
  - Robert Spano, American conductor and pianist
- May 9 – Sean Altman, American singer-songwriter and guitarist (Rockapella)
- May 10
  - Danny Carey, American rock drummer
  - Ayako Fuji, Japanese enko singer
- May 17 – Enya, Irish singer-songwriter
- May 20 – Nick Heyward, singer-songwriter
- May 29 – Melissa Etheridge, singer-songwriter
- May 30 – Gina Sanders, opera singer and vocal pedagogue
- June 1 – Peter Machajdík, Slovak composer
- June 4 – El DeBarge, singer
- June 6 – Tom Araya (Slayer)
- June 9 – Debasis Chakroborty, Indian classical slide guitar player
- June 10
  - Kim Deal, American singer, songwriter and musician, twin of Kelley
  - Kelley Deal, American musician, twin of Kim
- June 14 – Boy George, English singer, songwriter, DJ and fashion designer.
- June 15 – Kai Eckhardt, German bass guitarist
- June 18 – Alison Moyet, British singer
- June 22
  - Jimmy Somerville, British singer
  - Bobby Gillespie, Scottish singer/songwriter, founding vocalist of Primal Scream
- June 24
  - Dennis Danell, American singer and guitarist (Social Distortion) (died 2000)
  - Curt Smith, singer (Tears for Fears)
- June 25 – Ricky Gervais, English comedian and singer
- June 26 – Terri Nunn (Berlin)
- June 29
  - Greg Hetson (Circle Jerks, Bad Religion)
  - Sharon Lawrence, American actress
- July 2 – Paul Geary (Extreme)
- July 5
  - Timothy Drury, American composer, keyboardist, guitarist, vocalist, songwriter and visual artist
- July 6 – Rick Price, Australian singer/songwriter
- July 7 – Leon Bosch, South African-born double bass player
- July 8
  - Andrew Fletcher, English keyboard player (Depeche Mode) (died 2022)
  - Toby Keith, American singer-songwriter, guitarist, producer, and actor (died 2024)
- July 10 – Jacky Cheung, Hong Kong singer and actor
- July 17 – Guru, American rapper, producer and actor (Gang Starr) (died 2010)
- July 21 – Jim Martin, American guitarist (Faith No More).
- July 22 – Keith Sweat, R&B/soul singer
- July 23 – Martin Gore, English rock musician and songwriter
- July 24 – Maxim Fedotov, violinist and conductor
- July 26
  - Gary Cherone American rock singer (Extreme)
  - Keiko Matsui, Japanese pianist and composer
- August 2 – Pete de Freitas, Trinidad-born rock drummer (Echo & the Bunnymen) (died 1989)
- August 7 – Carlos Vives, Colombian vallenato vocalist and television actor
- August 8
  - Rikki Rockett, born Richard Ream, American glam rock drummer (Poison)
  - The Edge, born David Howell Evans, British rock guitarist (U2)
- August 10 – Jon Farriss, Australian rock drummer (INXS)
- August 12 – Lawrence (Hayward), English alternative rock musician
- August 15 – Matt Johnson, English singer-songwriter
- August 19 – Cor Bakker, Dutch pianist
- August 22
  - Andrés Calamaro, Argentine musician
  - Roland Orzabal, English new wave singer-songwriter (Tears for Fears)
- August 23 – Dean DeLeo (Stone Temple Pilots)
- August 24 – Mark Bedford (Madness)
- August 25 – Billy Ray Cyrus, American singer and actor
- August 26 – Daniel Lévi, French singer-songwriter, composer and pianist (died 2022)
- August 28 – Kim Appleby, singer (Mel and Kim)
- September 2 – Ron Wasserman, composer and singer
- September 5 – Marc-André Hamelin, pianist and composer
- September 6
  - Scott Travis, American metal drummer (Judas Priest)
  - Paul Waaktaar-Savoy, guitarist and songwriter (a-ha)
- September 7 – Jean-Yves Thibaudet, pianist
- September 12 – Mylène Farmer, singer, songwriter, actress and author
- September 13 – Dave Mustaine (Megadeth)
- September 16
  - Bilinda Butcher, English singer-songwriter and guitarist (My Bloody Valentine)
  - T La Rock, American rapper
- September 22 – Michael Torke, composer
- September 26 – Cindy Herron, American singer and actress (En Vogue)
- September 27 – Andy Lau, Hong Kong actor and singer
- September 30 – Sally Yeh, Hong Kong singer and actress
- October 4 – Jon Secada, Cuban-American singer, songwriter, actor and record producer
- October 8
  - Ted Kooshian, American jazz pianist
  - Jon Stevens, New Zealand singer and stage actor
- October 9 – Kurt Neumann (The BoDeans)
- October 10 – Martin Kemp (Spandau Ballet)
- October 11 – Amr Diab, Egyptian singer
- October 18 – Wynton Marsalis, jazz trumpeter and composer
- October 26 – Erica Muhl, American composer and conductor
- October 29 – Randy Jackson, singer (The Jacksons)
- October 30 – Franz Stahl, guitarist (Foo Fighters)
- October 31 – Larry Mullen, drummer for the rock band U2
- November 2 – k.d. lang, Canadian singer-songwriter
- November 4
  - Daron Hagen, classical and opera composer
  - Edward Knight, American composer
- November 5 – David Bryson (Counting Crows)
- November 6
  - Florent Pagny, French singer
  - Daniele Gatti, conductor
- November 8 – Leif Garrett, singer
- November 12 – Michaela Paetsch, American violinist (died 2023)
- November 13 – Klayton, American rock musician
- November 14
  - Antonio Flores, Spanish singer-songwriter and actor (died 1995)
  - Brett Walker, American songwriter and producer (died 2013)
- November 18 – Anthony Warlow, Australian singer
- November 19 - Crystal Waters, American singer and songwriter
- November 20 – Jim Brickman, songwriter and pianist
- November 22 – Stephen Hough, pianist
- November 25 – Nuccia Focile, operatic soprano
- December 11 – Dave King, Irish-American singer
- December 12 – Daniel O'Donnell, Irish singer
- December 17 – Sara Dallin, singer (Bananarama)
- December 20 – Mohammad Fouad, Arab singer and actor
- December 29 – Jim Reid, Scottish musician (The Jesus and Mary Chain)

== Deaths ==
- January – Margaret Balfour, mezzo-soprano
- January 13 – Blanche Ring, US singer and actress, 89
- January 14 – Henry Geehl, pianist, 79
- February 4 – Alphonse Picou, jazz musician, 82
- February 7 – Noah Lewis, jug band musician
- February 20 – Percy Grainger, pianist and composer, 78
- March 3 – Paul Wittgenstein, pianist, 73
- March 6 – George Formby, English Music hall comedian, singer & songwriter and ukulele player extraordinaire
- March 8 – Sir Thomas Beecham, conductor, 81
- March 9 – Wilber Sweatman, jazz musician and composer
- March 16 – Václav Talich, Czech conductor, violinist and teacher, 77
- March 24 – Freddy Johnson, jazz pianist and singer, 57 (cancer)
- April 2 – Wallingford Riegger, composer
- April 19 – Manuel Quiroga, violinist, 69
- April 29
  - Cisco Houston, folk singer
  - Miff Mole, jazz trombonist and bandleader
- May 8 – Victor Cornelius, Danish composer, pianist and singer, 63
- May 29 – Uuno Klami, composer
- June 6 – Art Gillham, songwriter
- July 6 – Scott LaFaro, jazz bassist
- August 8 – Mei Lanfang, Chinese opera performer, 66
- August 14
  - Heddle Nash, English operatic tenor, 67
  - Nadezhda Obukhova, Russian operatic mezzo-soprano, 75
- August 15
  - Stick McGhee, American guitarist
  - Morton Harvey, American vaudeville entertainer
- August 24 – Clarice Vance, American vaudeville singer, "the Southern singer", 91
- August 31 – Michele Cozzoli, Italian composer, conductor and arranger
- September 21 – Maurice Delage, pianist and composer, 81
- September 23 – Elmer Diktonius, composer and poet
- September 26
  - Bulbul, singer
  - Ernest Kaʻai, ukulele virtuoso
- September 27 – Peter Dawson, bass-baritone
- October 5
  - Carolina White, opera singer, 75
  - Booker Little, jazz musician, 23
- October 11 – Chico Marx, comedian and pianist, 74
- October 12 – Marguerite Monnot, songwriter, 58
- October 13 – Maya Deren, dancer and choreographer, 44
- October 20 – Sylvia Rexach, singer and composer, 39
- November 1 – Joan McCracken, dancer, 43
- November 22 – Ninon Vallin, operatic soprano, 75
- November 23 – York Bowen, pianist and composer, 77
- November 25 – Adelina de Lara, pianist and composer, 90
- November 26 – Aleksandr Goldenweiser, pianist and composer, 86
- December 18 – Leo Reisman, violinist and bandleader, 64
- December 20 – Moss Hart, musical theatre librettist, 57
- December 30 – Boris Ord, organist and choirmaster, 64

== Awards ==
=== Grammy Awards ===
- Grammy Awards of 1961

=== Eurovision Song Contest ===
- Eurovision Song Contest 1961
