= List of number-one hits of 1961 (Japan) =

This is a list of the songs that reached number one in Japan in 1961, according to Billboard magazine with data provided by Utamatic.

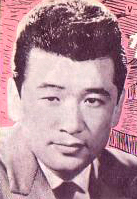
Frank Nagai's "Kimi Koishi" was the longest-running single of 1961, topping the chart for 10 weeks.

== Chart history ==
=== Monthly ===
Issue date	Song	Artist	Ref
January	"Greenfields"	The Brothers Four	
February	"The Green Leaves of Summer"	The Brothers Four	

=== Weekly ===
Issue date	Song	Artist	Ref
March 24	"G.I. Blues"	Elvis Presley	
March 31	"G.I. Blues"	Elvis Presley	
April 7	"G.I. Blues"	Elvis Presley	
April 14	"Tokyo Dodonpa Musume"	Mari Watanabe	
May 5	"Tokyo Dodonpa Musume"	Mari Watanabe	
May 12	"Tokyo Dodonpa Musume"	Mari Watanabe	
May 19	"Tokyo Dodonpa Musume"	Mari Watanabe	
May 26	"Tokyo Dodonpa Musume"	Mari Watanabe	
June 5	"Tokyo Dodonpa Musume"	Mari Watanabe	
June 12	"Tokyo Dodonpa Musume"	Mari Watanabe	
June 19	"Tokyo Dodonpa Musume"	Mari Watanabe	
June 26	"Kitakami Yakyoku"	Dark Ducks / Mahina Stars	
July 3	"Kitakami Yakyoku"	Dark Ducks / Mahina Stars	
July 17	"Kitakami Yakyoku"	Dark Ducks / Mahina Stars	
July 24	"Calendar Girl"	Neil Sedaka	
July 31	"Calendar Girl"	Neil Sedaka	
August 7	"Calendar Girl"	Neil Sedaka	
August 21	"Calendar Girl"	Neil Sedaka	
August 28	"Calendar Girl"	Neil Sedaka	
September 4	"Kimi Koishi"	Frank Nagai	
September 11	"Kimi Koishi"	Frank Nagai	
September 18	"Kimi Koishi"	Frank Nagai	
September 25	"Kimi Koishi"	Frank Nagai	
October 2	"Moliendo Café"	Hugo Blanco	
October 9	"Kimi Koishi"	Frank Nagai	
October 16	"Kimi Koishi"	Frank Nagai	
October 23	"Kimi Koishi"	Frank Nagai	
October 30	"Kimi Koishi"	Frank Nagai	
November 6	"Kimi Koishi"	Frank Nagai	
November 13	"Moliendo Café"	Hugo Blanco / Sachiko Nishida (Note: Her version of the song was titled Coffee Rumba (コーヒー・ルンバ).)	
November 20	"Kimi Koishi"	Frank Nagai	
November 27	"Moliendo Café"	Hugo Blanco / Sachiko Nishida	
December 4	"Moliendo Café"	Hugo Blanco / Sachiko Nishida	
December 11	"Koshu"	Akira Matsushima	
December 18	"Koshu"	Akira Matsushima	
December 25	"Koshu"	Akira Matsushima	
December 30	"Koshu"	Akira Matsushima	

== See also ==
- 1961 in Japanese music
