= 1961 in Japanese music =

In 1961 (Shōwa 36), Japanese music was released on records, and there were charts, awards, contests and festivals.

== Awards, contests and festivals ==
The 4th Osaka International Festival (Japanese: 大阪国際フェスティバル) was held from 13 April to 6 May 1961. The 3rd Japan Record Awards were held on 28 December 1961. The 12th NHK Kōhaku Uta Gassen was held on 31 December 1961.

== Number one singles ==
=== Billboard ===
Monthly

The following reached number 1 according to the monthly pop singles chart published in Billboard:

- January: Greenfields - The Brothers Four
- February: The Green Leaves of Summer - The Brothers Four

Weekly

The following reached number 1 according to the weekly pop singles chart published in Billboard:

- 24 March and 31 March: G.I. Blues - Elvis Presley

The following reached number 1 according to the weekly singles chart published in Billboard:

- 31 July: Calendar Girl - Neil Sedaka

Utamatic

The following reached number 1 according to the weekly Utamatic singles chart published in Billboard:

- 7 April: G.I. Blues - Elvis Presley
- 14 April, 5 May, 12 May, 19 May, 26 May, 5 June and 12 June: Tokyo Dodonpa Musume - Mari Watanabe
- 26 June, 3 July and 17 July: Kitakami Yakyoku - Dark Ducks (King) and Mahina Stars (RCA)
- 24 July, 31 July, 7 August, 21 August and 28 August: Calendar Girl - Neil Sedaka
- 4 September, 11 September, 18 September, 25 September, 9 October, 16 October, 23 October, 30 October, 6 November and 20 November: Kimi Koishi - Frank Nagai
- 2 October, 13 November, 27 November and 4 December: Moliendo Café - Hugo Blanco (Polydor) and Sachiko Nishida (Polydor). The Japanese language cover version of this song is called Coffee Rumba.
- 11 December, 18 December and 25 December: Koshu (Japanese: 湖愁) - Akira Matsushima

=== Cash Box ===
The following reached number 1 according to the weekly singles chart published in Cash Box:

- 22 April, 29 April and 6 May: G.I. Blues - Elvis Presley (Victor) and Kyu Sakamoto (Toshiba)
- 13 May, 20 May, 27 May, 3 June and 10 June: Where the Boys Are - Connie Francis (Columbia), Kayoko Moriyama (Toshiba) and Sachiko Nishida (Grammophon)

Local

The following reached number 1 according to the weekly local singles chart published in Cash Box:

- 17 June, 24 June, 1 July, 8 July, 15 July, 22 July, 29 July, 5 August, 12 August, 26 August, 9 September, 30 September and 7 October: Kitakami Yakyoku (Kitagami-Gawa-no Jojoh) - Hiroshi Wada & Mahina Stars (RCA), Dark Ducks (King), Tsuzuko Sugawara, Joji Takagi (Polydor) and Trío Los Paraguayos (Philips)
- 14 October: Kutsukake Tokijirō - Yukio Hashi
- 21 October, 28 October, 4 November and 11 November: Suttobi Jingi - Yukio Hashi
- 18 November, 2 December, 9 December and 16 December: Hokkiko - Bonny Jacks (King), Hiroshi Wada & Mahina Stars (Victor) and The Four Lads (Toshiba)
- 23 December: Ueo Muite Arukoo - Kyu Sakamoto

International

The following reached number 1 according to the weekly international singles chart published in Cash Box:

- 17 June, 24 June and 1 July: Calendar Girl - Neil Sedaka (Victor), Kyu Sakamoto (Toshiba) and Mickey Curtis (Victor)
- 8 July: Surrender - Elvis Presley (Victor) and June Valli (Mercury)
- 15 July: Exodus - Mantovani (London), Pat Boone (Dot) and Ferrante & Teicher (United Artists)
- 22 July, 29 July, 5 August, 12 August, 19 August, 26 August, 9 September, 30 September and 7 October: Broken Promises (Italian: Promessi Falsi, Japanese: 黒い傷あとのブルース) - Henry de Paris (French: Henri de Pari, Japanese: アンリ・ド・パリ楽団) (Colpix), Terumi Nagashima (Japanese: 長嶋てるみ) (King), Yozo Higashiyama (Victor), Hiroshi Mizuhara (Toshiba), Akira Kobayashi (Columbia), Yūjirō Ishihara (Teichiku) and Eija Kitamura & his Quintet (King)
- 14 October, 21 October, 28 October, 4 November, 11 November, 18 November and 2 December: Sucu Sucu - Ping Ping (Kapp), Danny Iida & Paradise King (Toshiba), Hiroko Takegoshi (Victor), The Peanuts (King), Smiley Ohara with his Band (King) and Sachiko Nishida
- 9 December, 16 December and 23 December: Moliendo Café - Sachiko Nishida (Polydor), Hugo Blanco (Polydor) and Shoichiro Matsumiya (Japanese: 松宮庄一郎) (Toshiba)

== Annual charts ==
Kyu Sakamoto's Ueo Muite Arukoo was number 1 in the Japanese kayokyoku annual singles chart published in Billboard.

== Classical music ==
The Sapporo Symphony Orchestra was established.

== Film ==
The music of Mozu (Japanese: もず) and Bad Boys, by Tōru Takemitsu, won the 16th Mainichi Film Award for Best Music.

== Television and radio ==
Minna no Uta was first broadcast on 3 April 1961.

== Music industry ==
There were fifty record labels from nine companies. The number of releases was 6,097.

== See also ==
- Timeline of Japanese music
- 1961 in Japan
- 1961 in music
- w:ja:1961年の音楽
