= The Brothers Four (album) =

Studio album by The Brothers Four
- Released: 1960
- Genre: Folk
- Length: 30:53
- Label: Columbia

The Brothers Four chronology
Rally 'Round (1960)	The Brothers Four (1960)	Roamin' (1961)

Singles from The Brothers Four
- 1. "Greenfields/Angelique-O" Released: January 25, 1960

Professional ratings
Review scores
Source	Rating
AllMusic	3/0 stars

The Brothers Four is the debut studio album by The Brothers Four. It was released in 1960 by Columbia Records.

== Track listing ==
=== Side A ===
1. "The Zulu Warrior" (Josef Marais)
2. "Sama Kama Wacky Brown" (Ed Warren, George Goehring)
3. "The Damsel's Lament (I Never Will Marry)" (Texas Gladden)
4. "Yellow Bird" (Alan and Marilyn Bergman, Norman Luboff)
5. "Angelique-O" (Lord Burgess, William Attaway)
6. "Superman" (Bob Flick, Dick Foley, John Paine, Mike Kirkland)

=== Side B ===
1. "East Virginia" (Frank Miller, Richard Dehr, Terry Gilkyson)
2. "Greenfields" (Frank Miller, Richard Dehr, Terry Gilkyson)
3. "Darlin', Won't You Wait" (Lee Pockriss, Paul Vance)
4. "Eddystone Light"
5. "Banua"
6. "Hard Travelin'" (Woody Guthrie)

== Chart positions ==
Chart (1960)	Peak position
US Billboard Top LP's (Mono Action Albums)	11

Singles

Year	Single	Chart	Peak position
1960	"Greenfields"	US Hot 100	2
1960	"Greenfields"	UK Top Singles	40
