= BMOC =

BMOC can refer to:

- Backup mission operations center, in spacecraft operations
- "Big Man on Campus", an American colloquialism for a popular high school or college boy involved in some high-profile activity, such as varsity sports or school government
- British Mathematical Olympiad Committee
- "B.M.O.C." (The Cleveland Show), an episode of the U.S. TV series The Cleveland Show
- Big Man on Campus, a television series
- BMOC: Best Music On/Off Campus, 1961 album
