= Memories Are Made of This =

Single by Dean Martin
- B-side: "Change of Heart"
- Released: November 28, 1955
- Recorded: October 28, 1955
- Studio: Capitol (Hollywood)
- Genre: Traditional pop
- Length: 2:15
- Label: Capitol
- Songwriters: Terry Gilkyson, Richard Dehr & Frank Miller

Dean Martin singles chronology
"Chee Chee-Oo Chee (Sang The Little Bird)" (1955)	"Memories Are Made of This" (1955)	"Relax-ay-Voo" (1955)

"Memories Are Made of This" is a popular song about nostalgia, written in 1955 by Terry Gilkyson, Richard Dehr, and Frank Miller. They were the members of a three-pieced group called "The Easy Riders", who served as a backing band for Dean Martin's version of this song, also released in 1955.

== History ==
The song was first issued by Mindy Carson with Ray Conniff's Orchestra and The Columbians. Carson's version reached No. 53 on Billboard's Top 100 chart.

The most popular version of the song was recorded by Dean Martin in 1955. He was backed by The Easy Riders (who consisted of Gilkyson, Dehr, and Miller), who wrote it. On the B-side of the 45 and 78 recordings was "Change of Heart" written by John Rox.

Martin's version reached No. 1 on Billboard's Top 100 chart, remaining at the top for five weeks in 1956, while spending six weeks atop Billboard's chart of songs "Most Played by Jockeys", five weeks atop Billboard's chart of "Best Sellers in Stores", and four weeks atop Billboard's chart of songs "Most Played in Juke Boxes". It became a Gold record and Martin's biggest hit. It was also his only UK number one hit, topping the UK Singles Chart on 23 February 1956, and remaining at the top for four weeks. The song also reached No. 2 in the Netherlands and No. 20 in Flanders.

Gale Storm released a version of the song in late 1955, which reached No. 5 on Billboard's chart of songs "Most Played by Jockeys", while reaching No. 16 on "The Top 100".

After the 1956 Hungarian Revolution, the song was adapted into the "Honvágy-dal" ('The Song of Homesickness') and used as an unofficial anthem for refugees scattered around the world. Recorded by Ida Boros, it became a cultural phenomenon and a sign of protest against the communist government.

The song charted once more in 1966 by the Drifters, a No. 48 hit for them. It was recorded by Anne Murray for her Croonin' album in 1993, but it was only released as a bonus track on the special Croonin' album put out by Heartland Records.

In Germany, titled "Heimweh" ("Homesickness"), with lyrics by Ernst Bader and Dieter Rasch, and performed by Freddy Quinn, the song was 14 weeks at number one, the most successful song of 1956. Worldwide it sold more than eight million, thus exceeding sales of the Dean Martin version.

== Other notable recordings ==
English versions:

- Dave King (1956)
- Petula Clark (1956)
- Bing Crosby for his album Songs I Wish I Had Sung the First Time Around (1956)
- Roger Williams (1959. #81 in Music Vendor)
- Ray Conniff (1960)
- The Everly Brothers (1960)
- Jim Reeves (1963)
- Paul Anka (1963)
- Frank Sinatra (1964)
- Little Richard (1964)
- Cliff Richard and The Shadows (1965)
- The Drifters (1966)
- Val Doonican (1967)
- Shorty Long (1969)
- Statler Brothers (1981)
- Leo Kottke (1983)
- Stanley and the Turbines - rocksteady version (1983)
- Johnny Cash (1996)
- Deana Martin (2006)

German versions:

- Freddy Quinn Heimweh (Dort wo die Blumen blüh'n) (1956)
- ZK, later Die Toten Hosen Heimweh (1980)
- Erste Allgemeine Verunsicherung Alk-Parade (1991)
- Stephan Remmler und die Schatzsucher Heimweh (1991)
- Element of Crime Heimweh (2004) Soundtrack The Edukators

Hungarian versions:

- Ilona Hollós (1957)
- Bojtorján (1984)

Croatian version:

- Vice Vukov Sve je daleko sad (1966)

Swedish version:

- Staffan Broms with Jörgen Ingmann Det är så en dröm blir till (1956)

== See also ==
- List of best-selling singles in Germany
