= The Lure of the Grand Canyon =

1961 studio album by Andre Kostelanetz and his orchestra

Studio album by Andre Kostelanetz and His Orchestra
- Released: 1961
- Recorded: 1961
- Genre: classical; spoken Word
- Length: 42:42
- Label: Columbia

Professional ratings
Review scores
Source	Rating
AllMusic	link

The Lure of the Grand Canyon is a classical music album by Andre Kostelanetz and his orchestra. It featured a guest spoken-word appearance by country singer Johnny Cash. It was released in 1961 (see 1961 in music) by Columbia Records.

The album consists primarily of a recording of Ferde Grofé's Grand Canyon Suite, conducted by Andre Kostelanetz, and includes authentic sounds recorded in the Grand Canyon itself. A spoken commentary by Cash makes up the 13-minute-long sixth and last track, preceded by the five movements of the suite, and describes a day spent visiting the famous canyon.

== Track listing ==
No.	Title	Length
1.	"Sunrise"	5:58
2.	"Painted Desert"	3:59
3.	"On the Trail"	8:34
4.	"Sunset"	4:46
5.	"Cloudburst"	8:07
6.	"A Day in the Grand Canyon"	11:18
Total length:		42:42
