= Marianne (Terry Gilkyson song) =

Traditional Trinidadian calypso

Song
- Genre: Calypso
- Songwriter: Roaring Lion

"Marianne" is a traditional calypso song made popular by Trinidadian calypsonian Roaring Lion. Writing credits on the Easy Riders recording are Terry Gilkyson, Richard Dehr, and Frank Miller.

== History ==
"Mary Ann" is a traditional calypso that was recorded by Trinidadian calypsonian Roaring Lion (born Rafael de Leon). It was popular with steel bands and revelers during a spontaneous carnival celebration on V-J Day in Trinidad in 1945, at the end of World War II. The song's lyrics allude to Mary Ann's occupation:

All day, all night, Miss Mary Ann
Down by the seaside, she sifting sand.

== Recordings ==
- Spanish bandleader Xavier Cugat recorded a version of "Mary Ann" in the late 1940s. During the 1956–57 American calypso craze, the Easy Riders, Burl Ives, and other interpreters of folk music further popularized the song, generally under the title "Marianne". Harry Belafonte recorded the track on at least three albums. "Mary Ann" continued to be a favorite with steel bands and calypso entertainers at Caribbean tourist hotels for many years.
- The most popular version was recorded by Terry Gilkyson and the Easy Riders (No. 4 on the Billboard Top 100 in 1957); another version was recorded by the Hilltoppers in 1957 (No. 3 on the Billboard Top 100).
- Les Compagnons de la chanson recorded a French version, which reached No. 3 on the Belgian chart in 1957.
- Trini Lopez included "Marianne" on his album Trini Lopez at PJ's on Reprise Records RS-6093 as part of a medley with "Gotta Travel On", "Down by the Riverside", "When the Saints Go Marching In", and "Volare".

== References in popular culture ==
- In Ian Fleming's 1958 James Bond novel Dr. No, Honeychile Rider whistles Marion [sic] on a beach in Jamaica and Bond joins in singing a couple of lines. Fleming implies that the original calypso was racier and had been 'cleaned up' in the contemporaneous popular recording. The lines he quotes are:

All day, all night, Marion,
Sittin' by the seaside siftin' sand …
The water from her eyes could sail a boat,
The hair on her head could tie a goat …

The last two lines are not in the Terry Gilkyson version.

- Allan Sherman sang about Cary Grant based on this song, which went as follows (from Shticks of one Kind and Half Dozen of Another):

All day, all night, Cary Grant
That's all I hear from my wife, is Cary Grant
What can he do that I can't
Big deal, big star, Cary Grant

- In the nudie-cartoon anthology Sex to Sexty, which included "Balled-Up Ballads"—popular tunes with racy lyrics—the following lines were written for "Marianne":

All day, all night, Marianne;
Who the hell you think I am, Superman?
