= Greenfields (song) =

Single by the Brothers Four

from the album The Brothers Four
- B-side: "Angelique-O"
- Released: January 25, 1960
- Recorded: July 28, 1959
- Genre: Folk
- Length: 2:55
- Label: Columbia; 41571
- Songwriters: Frank Miller, Richard Dehr, Terry Gilkyson

The Brothers Four singles chronology
"Greenfields" (1960)	"My Tani" (1960)

"Greenfields" is a song written by Frank Miller, Richard Dehr, and Terry Gilkyson (The Easy Riders) and performed by the Brothers Four. In 1960, the track reached No. 2 on the Billboard Hot 100 and No. 2 in Canada as well. In Europe the single reached No. 40 on the Record Retailer Single Chart and No. 1 in Norway.

It was featured on their 1960 album, The Brothers Four. The Brothers Four version ranked No. 13 on Billboard magazine's Top 100 songs of 1960. It was also nominated for Grammy Award for Best Performance by a Vocal Group and Grammy Award for Best Ethnic or Traditional Folk Recording.

The Four Brothers performed Greenfields on The Ed Sullivan Show, where lead singer Dick Foleys voice is said to have cracked. Greenfields featured on the bands golden anniversary album, that was released in 2010, where members of the Sno-King Chorale joined the band on the track. The band is best known for Greenfields.

== Other charting versions ==
- The Beverley Sisters released a version as "Green Fields" in 1960 which reached No. 29 on the UK Singles Chart.
- Les Compagnons de la chanson recorded a French version titled "Verte campagne" in 1960 and it reached No. 2 in France and No. 3 in Belgium.
- The Vogues released a version as "Green Fields" in 1969 which reached No. 19 on the U.S. easy listening chart and No. 92 on the Billboard Hot 100.
- The Brazilian group Nilo Amaro e seus Cantores de Ébano released a version in Portuguese in 1961.
- The Sons of the Pioneers released a version of "Green Fields", as the closing track on their 1968 album "Sons Of The Pioneers – San Antonio Rose And Other Country Favorites", on RCA Camden CAS-2205
- The Polish-Soviet singer Edita Piekha recorded a Russian adaptation of the song titled "City of my Childhood" (Город детства). At the time it was believed to be based on a Scottish folk song.
