= Terry Gilkyson =

American singer-songwriter (1916–1999)

- Born: June 17, 1916; Phoenixville, Pennsylvania, U.S.
- Died: October 15, 1999 (aged 83) Austin, Texas, U.S.
- Genre: Folk
- Occupations: Singer, songwriter (composer and lyricist)
- Instrument: guitar
- Years active: 1950s-1960s
- Formerly of: The Easy Riders

Terry Gilkyson (June 17, 1916 – October 15, 1999) was an American folk singer and songwriter, known for writing hit songs such as "The Cry of the Wild Goose", "Tell Me a Story", "Memories Are Made Of This", and "The Bare Necessities". With the Easy Riders he had a hit with "Marianne".

== Biography ==
Gilkyson was born Hamilton Henry Gilkyson in Phoenixville, Pennsylvania, and graduated from St. George's School in Middletown, Rhode Island in 1935. By his early twenties, he had become a worker on a ranch in Tucson, Arizona, then joined the United States Army Air Forces during World War II. In 1947, he married Jane Haughton and moved to California to pursue a career as a folk singer.

He wrote and recorded "The Cry of the Wild Goose", which became a hit song for Frankie Laine in 1950, as well as the 1953 hit song "Tell Me a Story" recorded by Jimmy Boyd and Laine. In 1951 Gilkyson appeared in, as well as wrote continuing songs for, the Cinecolor Western film Slaughter Trail that, in the manner of High Noon, had ballads throughout the film relating to the plot. He was also featured vocalist on the Weavers No. 1 hit recording of "On Top Of Old Smokey", as well as their recording of "Across The Wide Missouri". He appeared and sang in the 1956 Western Star in the Dust with John Agar, Mamie Van Doren, and Richard Boone.

In 1956, he formed a group called the Easy Riders with Richard Dehr and Frank Miller. The group had a major hit with "Marianne". The record sold in excess of one million copies, earning a Gold disc. The three also wrote "Memories Are Made of This", which became a popular song in several versions, most particularly the one sung by Dean Martin backed by the Easy Riders. An adaptation of the song became an anthem for refugees from the 1956 Hungarian Revolution. In 1959, he wrote and recorded an album, 8 Story-Songs from the Bible. The song "Greenfields" co-written with band-mates Frank Miller and Richard Dehr became a number two song in North America in 1960 when performed by The Brothers Four.

In the 1960s, he left the group to work for the Walt Disney Studios, writing music both for movies and the television series The Wonderful World of Disney especially "The Scarecrow of Romney Marsh." In 1968, he was nominated for an Academy Award for "The Bare Necessities" from the 1967 animated film The Jungle Book.

Other songs Gilkyson wrote for Disney films were:

- Swiss Family Robinson (1960) Song: "My Heart Was An Island'"
- Savage Sam (1963) Song: "Savage Sam and Me"
- The Three Lives of Thomasina (1964) Song: "Thomasina"
- The Moon-Spinners (1964) Song: "The Moon-Spinners"
- The Jungle Book (1967) Song: "The Bare Necessities", as well as several unused songs composed for the film ("Brothers All", "The Song of the Seeonee", "Monkey See, Monkey Do", "I Knew I Belonged to Her", "In A Day's Work", and "The Mighty Hunters")
- My Dog, the Thief (1969) Song: "That Dog, Barabbas"
- The Aristocats (1970) Song: "Thomas O'Malley Cat"
- Bayou Boy (1971) Song: "Bayou Boy"

== Death ==
He died in Austin, Texas, while visiting family. His interment was at Morris Cemetery in his hometown of Phoenixville, Pennsylvania. He was survived by his children, guitarist Tony Gilkyson (formerly of the bands Lone Justice and X), singer-songwriter Eliza Gilkyson, and Warner Bros. Records executive Nancy Gilkyson.

== Filmography ==
- Slaughter Trail (1951)
- Star in the Dust (1956)

== See also ==
- Category:Songs written by Terry Gilkyson
