= Le Petit Gonzales =

Studio album by Dalida
- Released: 1962
- Recorded: 1961–62
- Length: 23:41
- Label: Barclay

Dalida chronology
Loin de moi (1961)	Le Petit Gonzales (1962)	Eux (1963)

Singles from Le Petit Gonzales
- 1. "Achète-moi un juke-box" Released: January 1962; 2. "Le Petit Gonzales" Released: 1962; 3. "Je l'attends" Released: 1962

Le Petit Gonzales is an album by Dalida. It was her first big step in the rock and roll world. It contains hits like "Le Petit Gonzales" (one of her biggest since "Gondolier" from 1958), "Je l'attends" and "Achète-moi un juke-box".

== Track listing ==
Barclay – 80 183,

Side one
No.	Title	Writer(s)	Length
1.	"Le Petit Gonzales"	Buddy Kaye, David Hess & Ethel Lee	2:34
2.	"Je l'attends"	Georges Aber, Howard Greenfield & Neil Sedaka	2:40
3.	"Petit Éléphant Twist"	Guy Bertret, Henry Mancini & Roger Desbois	2:06
4.	"Toutes les Nuits" (All Through the Nights)	Colette Nicolas & James Jr. Duncan	1:57
5.	"T'aimerai toujours"	Danyel Gérard & Lucien Morisse	2:20

Side two
No.	Title	Writer(s)	Length
1.	"La Leçon de twist"	Danyel Gérard, Giuseppe Mengozzi & Lucien Morisse	2:13
2.	"À ma chance"	Danyel Gérard, Don Gibson, Mack Gordon & Robert King	2:37
3.	"Que sont devenues les fleurs" (Where Have All the Flowers Gone)	Guy Béart & Pete Seeger	2:27
4.	"Je ne peux pas me passer de toi"	André Salvet, Lucien Morisse & Robert Marcucci	2:13
5.	"Achète-moi un juke-box"	Colette Nicolas & Georges Garvarentz	2:44
Total length:			23:41

== See also ==
- Dalida albums discography

== Sources ==
- L'argus Dalida: Discographie mondiale et cotations, by Daniel Lesueur, Éditions Alternatives, 2004. ISBN 2-86227-428-3 and ISBN 978-2-86227-428-7.
