= The Easy Riders =

American folk music band

- Origin: Los Angeles, California
- Genres: Folk music
- Years active: 1956–1959
- Past members: Terry Gilkyson; Richard Dehr; Frank Miller

The Easy Riders were an American folk music band, that operated from 1956 to 1959, consisting of Terry Gilkyson, Richard Dehr, and Frank Miller. Their career was guided by Mitch Miller, who had them under contract for Columbia Records.

Their greatest hit, in early 1957, was the song "Marianne". The group also composed some tunes for the 1958 cinemiracle-documentary Windjammer, such as "Kari Waits for Me" and "Sugar Cane". One of Gilkyson's songs was a number one hit for Frankie Laine, "The Cry of the Wild Goose". Gilkyson wrote many tunes for Laine, and he and The Easy Riders were also featured on Frankie's 1957 hit, "Love Is a Golden Ring", having also penned the number for Laine.

Many songs of the group became better known through the interpretation of other singers, such as The Kingston Trio, Gale Storm, Harry Belafonte, Doris Day, Burl Ives and The Brothers Four. Their song "Memories Are Made of This" became a top hit through the interpretation by Dean Martin. After the Easy Riders made a single with the 1927 song "Send for de Captain", the Beach Boys adapted it from The Kingston Trio’s cover version and made of it their hit "Sloop John B".

Gilkyson left the group in the early 1960s to work for Disney studios and wrote the Oscar-nominated "The Bare Necessities" for Disney's The Jungle Book.

Dehr died in October 1989, and Gilkyson died in October 1999.

== Discography ==
- Marianne and Other Songs You'll Like (1957, Columbia CL 990)
- Blue Mountain (1958, Columbia CL 1103)
- Wanderin': Folk Songs by The Easy Riders (1959, Columbia CL 1272)
- Rollin' (1960, Kapp KL-1196)
- Remember the Alamo (1961, Kapp KL-1216)
- The Cry of the Wild Goose (1963, Kapp KS-3327)
