= Slaughter Trail =

1951 film by Irving Allen

- Original film poster
- Directed by: Irving Allen
- Screenplay by: Sid Kuller
- Produced by: Irving Allen
- Starring: Brian Donlevy; Gig Young; Virginia Grey; Andy Devine; Terry Gilkyson; Robert Hutton
- Cinematography: Jack Greenhalgh
- Edited by: Fred Allen
- Production company: Justal Productions
- Distributed by: RKO Pictures
- Release date: October 11, 1951 (Los Angeles)
- Running time: 77 minutes
- Country: United States
- Language: English

Slaughter Trail is a 1951 Cinecolor Western film produced and directed by Irving Allen and starring Brian Donlevy, Gig Young and Virginia Grey.

== Plot ==
A trio of masked bandits rob a stagecoach, secretly assisted by one of its passengers. The fleeing bandits encounter some unarmed Navajo men, shoot them and steal their horses. One of the Navajo survives and informs the tribe, which wages war against all white men. The commander of the U.S. Cavalry fort, who is friendly with the Navajo chief, is caught in the middle.

== Cast ==
- Brian Donlevy as Capt. Dempster
- Gig Young as Ike Vaughn
- Virginia Grey as Lorabelle Larkin
- Andy Devine as Sgt. Macintosh
- Robert Hutton as Lt. Morgan
- Terry Gilkyson as Singalong

== Production ==
The film was produced in 1950 and was originally to have been released by Eagle-Lion before RKO Pictures signed with Justal Productions as the film's distributor.

The film was shot with Howard da Silva in the lead, but after he was accused of communist leanings, RKO Pictures ordered da Silva's scenes reshot with Brian Donlevy. Allen reshot the film in three days and sold it to RKO for $200,000.

In a manner similar to that of High Noon, Slaughter Trail contains continuing ballads throughout the film that ask and answer questions as well as narrate the story.

== Reception ==
In The Philadelphia Inquirer, critic Mildred Martin called Slaughter Trail "the worst Western this reviewer ever had the bad luck to encounter".
