= Loin de moi =

Studio album by Dalida
- Released: December 1961
- Recorded: 1961
- Genre: World music, pop, rock and roll, exotica
- Length: 25:32
- Label: Barclay

Dalida chronology
Rendezvous mit Dalida (1961)	Loin de moi (1961)	Le petit Gonzales (1962)

Singles from Loin de moi
- 1. "Protégez-moi Seigneur" Released: September 1961; 2. "Plus loin que la terre" Released: November 1961

Loin de moi (lit.: 'Far from me') is Dalida's ninth album. This album represents Dalida's slow shift from her exotica style to a more pop-rock genre. This album, not as successful as the previous, contains hits like "Avec une poignée de terre" and "Nuits d'Espagne".

== Track listing ==
Barclay – 80 165,

Side one
No.	Title	Writer(s)	Length
1.	"Loin de moi"	Georges Aber & Johnny Tillotson	2:10
2.	"Plus loin que la terre" (Stranger from Durango)	André Salvet & Richard Podolor	2:20
3.	"Comme une symphonie" (Come Sinfonia)	Hubert Ithier & Pino Donaggio	2:40
4.	"Avec une poignée de terre" (A Hundred Pounds of Clay)	Bob Elgin, Kay Rogers, Luther Dixon, Manou Roblin & Rudi Revil	1:51
5.	"Nuits d'Espagne" (Spanish Harlem)	André Salvet, Jerry Leiber & Phil Spector	2:45

Side two
No.	Title	Writer(s)	Length
1.	"Cordoba"	Enric Madriguera & Jacques Plante	2:50
2.	"Tu ne sais pas" (Unforgiven)	André Salvet, John Schroeder, Lucien Morisse & Mike Hawker	2:30
3.	"Reste encore avec moi" (Non Mi Dire Chi Sei)	Giorgio Calabrese, Pierre Delanoë & Umberto Bindi	2:55
4.	"Tu peux le prendre" (You Can Have Hear)	André Salvet, Bill Cook & Lucien Morisse	2:46
5.	"Protégez-moi Seigneur" (Poderoso Senor)	André Hossein, André Salvet & Manuel Alvarez	2:45
Total length:			25:32

== See also ==
- Dalida albums discography

== Sources ==
- L'argus Dalida: Discographie mondiale et cotations, by Daniel Lesueur, Éditions Alternatives, 2004. ISBN 2-86227-428-3 and ISBN 978-2-86227-428-7.
