= Gina Sanders =

American media executive

- Born: 1959 or 1960 (age 65–66)
- Education: Tufts University

Gina Sanders (born 1959 or 1960) is an American media executive and venture capitalist. A member of the Newhouse family by marriage, Sanders has spent much of her career as an executive at Condé Nast.

== Education and personal life ==
Sanders is the daughter of Arnold and Joyce Sanders, a urologist at the Albert Einstein College of Medicine and a columnist for Women's News in Harrison, New York, respectively. Gina Sanders attended Tufts University, graduating magna cum laude. In 1993, she married Steven Newhouse, son of Donald Newhouse who is president of Advance Publications.

== Career ==
Sanders began her career working for ad agencies in Boston and New York for six years. She joined Condé Nast as an account manager for House & Garden in 1988. As of 1992, she was the magazine's sales-development manager. In 1994, she was promoted from advertising director of Details magazine to become its publisher. In 2002, she became the founding publisher of Teen Vogue. Under Sanders, Teen Vogue’s circulation grew from 450,000 at launch to 900,000 in the fall of 2006. Sanders has also been the vice president and publisher of Lucky and Gourmet magazines.

Sanders was president of Fairchild Fashion Media from 2010 to 2014, when Condé Nast sold most its assets. She next became president of global development at Condé Nast. She works at venture capital firm Advance Venture Partners, a subsidiary of Advance Publications. In 2018 she founded Gina's Collective, which mentors non-profit startups.
