= Theater am Dom =

Theatre in Cologne, North Rhine-Westphalia, Germany

Coordinates: 50°56′19″N 6°57′04″E

Theater am Dom is a theatre in Cologne, North Rhine-Westphalia, Germany.

Actors, who played in theatre, were:

Grit Boettcher, Herbert Bötticher, Volker Brandt, Jochen Busse, Thomas Fritsch, Harald Juhnke, Gunther Philipp, Günter Pfitzmann, Charles Regnier, Peter René Körner, Will Quadflieg, Barbara Schöne, Martin Semmelrogge, Karsten Speck, Wolfgang Spier, Susanne Uhlen and Grethe Weiser.
