= Soli II =

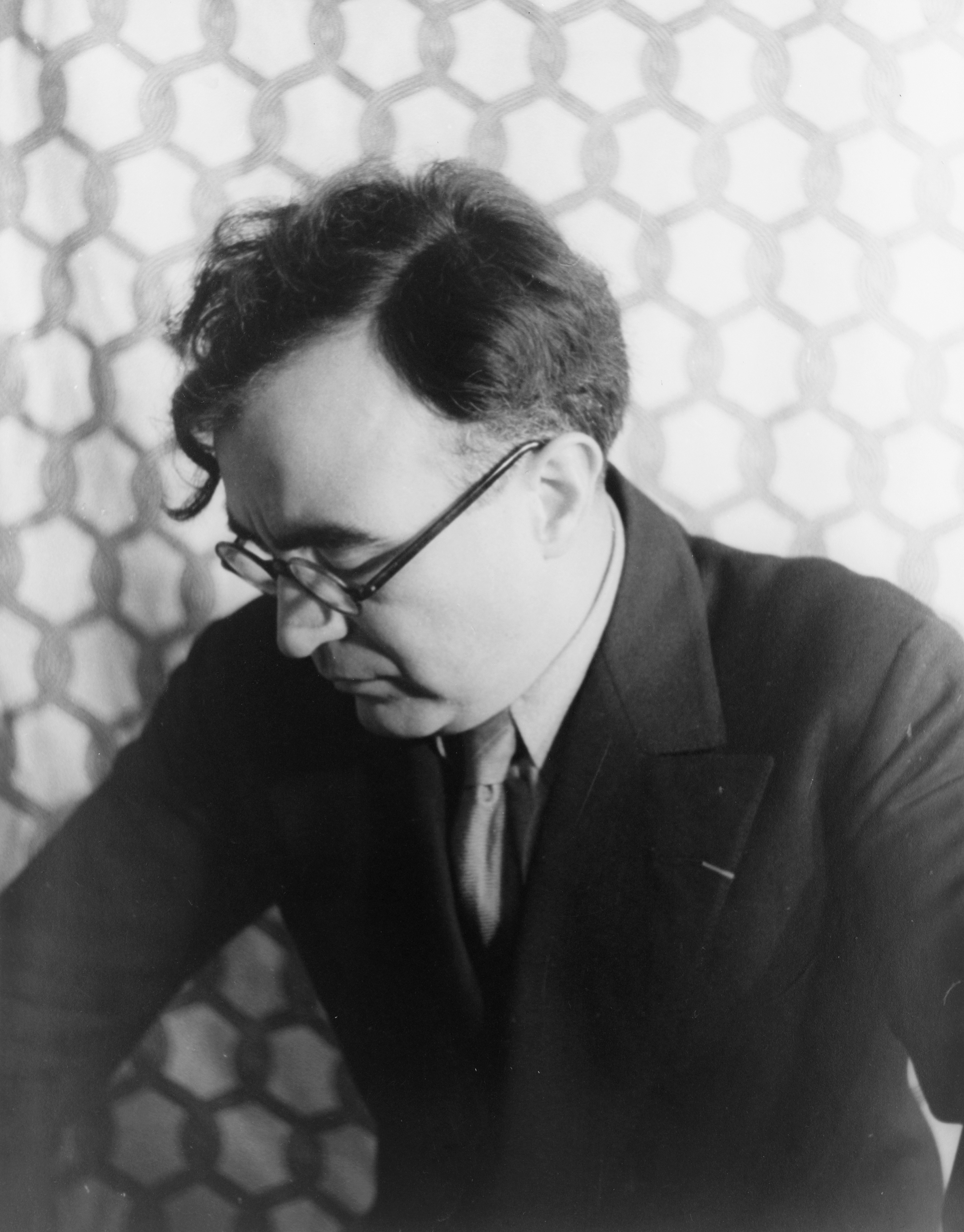
Carlos Chávez in 1937

Soli II is a composition for wind quintet by Mexican composer Carlos Chávez, written in 1961. It is the second of a series of four works given the title Soli, each featuring a succession of solos. It is the longest of the set, a performance lasting about 20 minutes.

The Solis belong to the more "experimental", high-modernist strand of Chávez's compositional output, in contrast to the more traditional character of most of the large-ensemble works. This group of works, which also includes the three Inventions (No. 1 for piano, 1958; No. 2 for string trio, 1965; No. 3 for harp, 1967) and the orchestral compositions Resonancias (1964), Elatio (1967), Discovery, Clio (both 1969), and Initium (1973), features an abstract, atonal musical language based on the principle of non-repetition. In the composer's own words, the objective is one of "constant rebirth, of true derivation: a stream that never comes back to its source; a stream of eternal development, like a spiral, always linked to, and continuing, its original source, but always searching for new and unlimited spaces".

== History ==
Soli II follows the first piece in the Soli series by nearly three decades. It was commissioned by the Inter-American Music Festival Executive Committee, and was premiered by the Philadelphia Wind Quintet on 23 April 1961, in the Coolidge Auditorium of the Library of Congress, Washington, DC, as part of the Second Inter-American Music Festival. The concert was recorded for broadcast by WTOP. A copy acquired by Voice of America for possible broadcast was archived from the original master tapes to digital preservation master WAV files by the Library of Congress Magnetic Recording Laboratory in 2004. OCLC number 85418286. LCCN 2006657067.

== Analysis ==
Soli II is in five movements, which are played without a break:

1. Prelude
2. Rondo
3. Aria
4. Sonatina
5. Finale

The suite-like design suggests a neoclassical formal approach, but a constantly evolving treatment of materials in the five movements masks the subtle use of repetition of slight motives and row forms within the continually evolutionary process characteristic of Chávez's work. As in the other works in the Soli series, each movement features a different solo instrument, though the others are rarely absent, and its harmonic language draws equally on diatonic and chromatic scales, while remaining resolutely atonal. Phrases are generally closed by cadences ending on major sevenths and minor ninths.

The first movement sets out from the extreme registers, with the movement's featured solo instrument, the flute, descends from its highest notes, accompanied by a rising line in the bassoon. The florid flute solo continues with discreet accompanying chords in the other instruments, eventually reaching a chorale-like closing sonority with all five instruments. In the second movement, the oboe leads a rondo-scherzo with dense ensemble writing.

Although the principle of non-repetition underlying all of the works in the Soli series is in conflict with the recurring tone rows of twelve-tone technique, the Aria movement of Soli II is an exception. Twelve-tone technique is used throughout this movement. In fact, both the Aria and the Sonatina are based almost exclusively on all-combinatorial twelve-tone rows with inherent repetitive properties. The Aria features solo bassoon, while the Sonatina has the strongest neoclassical overtones, with a waltz-like accompaniment to the agile solo clarinet. The Finale is an extended lament, dominated by the horn.

== Discography ==
- Chávez Conducted by Carlos Chávez: Soli I, Soli II, Soli IV. Ruben Islas, flute; Sally Van Den Berg, oboe; Anastasio Flores, clarinet; Louis Salomons, bassoon; Felipe Leon, trumpet; Vicente Zarzo, horn; Clemente Sanabria, trombone; Carlos Chávez, cond. LP recording, 1 disc: 12 in., 33⅓rpm, stereo. Odyssey Y 31534. New York: Columbia Records, 1972.
- Nueva música méxicana. Soli II, and works by Enríquez, Ibarra, Lara, and Lavista. Quinteto de Alientos de la Ciudad de México. Clásicos mexicanos: Serie contemporánea. CD recording, 1 disc: digital, 12 cm, stereo. Spartacus 21018. Mexico DF: Spartacus, 1995.
- Carlos Chávez: Complete Chamber Music Vol. 2. Energía, Soli I, Soli II, Soli IV, Sonata for Four Horns. Southwest Chamber Music. CD recording, 1 disc: digital, 12 cm, stereo. Cambria CD8851. Lomita, CA: Cambria Master Recordings, 2004.
- Quinteto Latino: 100 Years of Mexican Music for Wind Quintet/100 Años de música para quinteto de alientos. Chávez: Soli II, and works by Hurtado, Márquez, Lavista, and Ponce. Quinteto Latino. Recorded May 2010, January and March 2011, Fantasy Recording Studio, Berkeley, CA. CD recording, 1 disc: 12 cm, stereo. Con Brio CBR 21144. [USA]: Con Brio Recordings, 2011.
