= The Green Leaves of Summer =

Single by The Brothers Four

from the album BMOC: Best Music On/Off Campus
- Language: English
- B-side: "Beautiful Brown Eyes"
- Released: 1960
- Length: 3:20
- Label: Columbia
- Composer: Dimitri Tiomkin
- Lyricist: Paul Francis Webster

The Brothers Four singles chronology
"My Tani" (1960)	"The Green Leaves of Summer" (1960)	"Frogg" (1961)

"The Green Leaves of Summer" is a song, composed by Dimitri Tiomkin with lyrics by Paul Francis Webster, written for the 1960 film The Alamo. It was performed in the film's score by the vocal group The Brothers Four. In 1961, the song was nominated for an Academy Award; its parent soundtrack, for the film The Alamo, was awarded a Golden Globe Award for Best Original Score.

== History ==
In The Alamo, the song is heard on the last night before the Battle of the Alamo. Davy Crockett (John Wayne), when asked what he is thinking, responds "not thinking. Just remembering" as the song is heard. The men of the Alamo reminisce on their lives and reflect on their own mistakes, faith, and morality.

The song itself has no lyrical connection to the Alamo, or to any other historical events, but is simply a nostalgic reminiscence of the narrator's idyllic youth. Perhaps reflecting the kind of thoughts men might have the night before they expect to die.

== Chart performance ==
The Brothers Four recording of the song went to No. 65 on the US Billboard Hot 100. Their version also charted in Norway, reaching the No. 10 spot in the country.

== Other recordings ==
"The Green Leaves of Summer" has been covered by a number of musicians including:

- Sil Austin
- Kenny Ball & His Jazzmen
- Herb Alpert & the Tijuana Brass
- Frankie Avalon
- The Ray Conniff Singers
- Ken Dodd
- Anita Harris
- Hampton Hawes
- Mahalia Jackson
- Frankie Laine
- The Johnny Mann Singers
- Patti Page
- Nick Perito
- Peter and Gordon
- Nelson Riddle
- The Springfields
- The Ventures
- A French-language translation, "Le Bleu de l'été", was performed by Michèle Arnaud and Maya Casabianca (fr), A version by Les Compagnons de la chanson reached No. 3 on the French and Belgian charts.
- A Finnish-language translation, "Kesän vihreät lehvät", written by Sauvo Puhtila, was performed by both Eino Grön and Vieno Kekkonen (fi).

== Popular culture ==
The song received renewed interest when Nick Perito's version was featured in the title sequence of the 2009 film Inglourious Basterds, directed by Quentin Tarantino.
