= BMOC: Best Music On/Off Campus =

Studio album by The Brothers Four
- Released: 1961
- Genre: Folk
- Length: 32:20
- Label: Columbia

The Brothers Four chronology
Song Book (1961)	BMOC: Best Music On/Off Campus (1961)	In Person (1962)

Singles from BMOC: Best Music On/Off Campus
- 1. "The Green Leaves of Summer/Beautiful Brown Eyes" Released: September 19, 1960

Professional ratings
Review scores
Source	Rating
AllMusic	4/5 stars

BMOC: Best Music On/Off Campus is an album by The Brothers Four and was released in 1961 by Columbia Records. It was their fifth studio album to be released in the US.

== Track listing ==
=== Side A ===
1. "I Am a Roving Gambler" (Bob Flick, Dick Foley, John Paine, Mike Kirkland)
2. "Well, Well, Well" (Hamilton Camp, Bob Gibson)
3. "Sweet Rosyanne" (Arnold Fisher, Laurence Hodge)
4. "St. James Infirmary" (Joe Primrose)
5. "Riders in the Sky" (Stan Jones)
6. "When the Sun Goes Down" (Bob Flick, Dick Foley, John Paine, Mike Kirkland)

=== Side B ===
1. "The Green Leaves of Summer" (Paul Francis Webster, Dimitri Tiomkin)
2. "A Pretty Girl Is Like a Little Bird" (Alan Lomax, Clarence Ashley)
3. "My Little John Henry" (James "Iron Head" Baker)
4. "Beautiful Brown Eyes" (Alton Delmore)
5. "The Old Settler's Song" (John Lomax, Alan Lomax)
6. "With You Fair Maid" (Bob Flick, Dick Foley, John Paine, Mike Kirkland)

== Chart positions ==
Chart (1961)	Peak position
US Billboard Top LPs	4

Singles

Year	Single	Chart	Peak position
1960	"The Green Leaves of Summer"	Billboard Hot 100	65
