= Frank Miller (singer) =

American singer-songwriter

Frank Miller (July 29, 1918 – December 15, 2015) was an American singer and songwriter. He was born in Brooklyn, New York. He is best known for being part of a band called "The Easy Riders", with Richard Dehr and Miller: they accompanied Terry Gilkyson on the best-selling recording of their hit song "Marianne" as a single in 1956. Subsequently, Miller, Jerry Yester, and Doug Myres formed another "Easy Riders" group. His wife Juanita died in 2005 at the age of 81. Miller died in Durham, North Carolina in December 2015 at the age of 97.

== Links ==
- Frank Miller signing an autograph in 2009
