= The Brothers Four =

American folk group

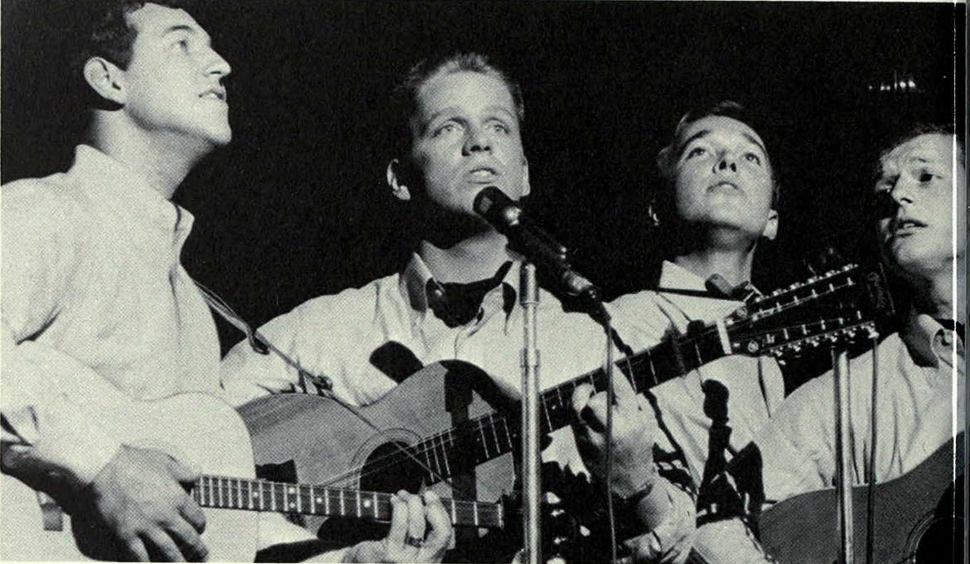
- The Brothers Four at University of Michigan, 1964–65

Background information
- Origin: Seattle, Washington, U.S.
- Genres: Folk, pop
- Years active: 1957–present
- Labels: Columbia (U.S.); Philips (U.K.); Various others
- Members: Bob Flick; Mike McCoy; Mark Pearson; Karl Olsen
- Past members: Mike Kirkland; Dick Foley; Bob Haworth; Tom Coe; John Paine; Terry Lauber; John Hylton
- Website: brothersfour.com

The Brothers Four is an American folk singing group formed in 1957 in Seattle, Washington, and best known for their 1960 hit song "Greenfields".

== History ==
Bob Flick, John Paine, Mike Kirkland, and Dick Foley met at the University of Washington, where they were members of the Phi Gamma Delta fraternity in 1956 (hence the "Brothers" appellation). Their first professional performances were the result of a prank played on them in 1958 by a rival fraternity, who had arranged for someone to call them, pretend to be from Seattle's Colony Club, and invite them to come down to audition for a gig. Even though they were not expected at the club, they were allowed to sing a few songs and were subsequently hired. Flick recalls them being paid "mostly in beer".

They left for San Francisco in 1959, where they met Mort Lewis, Dave Brubeck's manager. Lewis became their manager and later that year secured them a contract with Columbia Records. Their second single, "Greenfields", released in January 1960, hit No. 2 on the Billboard Hot 100, sold over one million copies and was awarded a gold disc by the RIAA. Their first album, The Brothers Four, released toward the end of the year, made the top 20. Other highlights of their early career included singing their fourth single, "The Green Leaves of Summer", from the John Wayne movie The Alamo, at the 1961 Academy Awards, and having their third album, BMOC: Best Music On/Off Campus, go top 10. They also recorded the title song for the Hollywood film Five Weeks in a Balloon in 1962 and the theme song for the ABC television series Hootenanny, "Hootenanny Saturday Night", in 1963. They also gave "Sloop John B" a try, released as "The John B Sails".

The British Invasion and the ascendance of edgier folk rock musicians such as Bob Dylan put an end to the Brothers Four's early period of success, but they kept performing and making records, doing particularly well in Japan and on the American hotel circuit.

The group attempted a comeback by recording a highly commercialized version of Dylan's "Mr. Tambourine Man" but were unable to release it because of licensing issues, though The Byrds were subsequently able to license the song for their Billboard No. 1 hit released in April 1965.

The group, in a business partnership with Jerry Dennon, built a radio station in Seaside, Oregon (KSWB) in 1968. The station was subsequently sold in 1972 to a group from Montana, and later to a self-proclaimed minister, and finally merged into a larger conglomerate of radio stations.

Mike Kirkland left the group in 1969 and was replaced by Mark Pearson, another University of Washington alumnus. In 1971, Pearson left and was replaced by Bob Haworth, who stayed until 1985 and was replaced by a returning Pearson. Dick Foley left the group in 1990 and was replaced by Terry Lauber. The group is still active after 68 years in the business.

Founding former member Kirkland died of cancer on August 20, 2020, at the age of 82. Dick Foley died after a long illness on March 15, 2026, at the age of 85. Founding member Paine died on November 9, 2024, at the age of 86.

== Selected discography ==
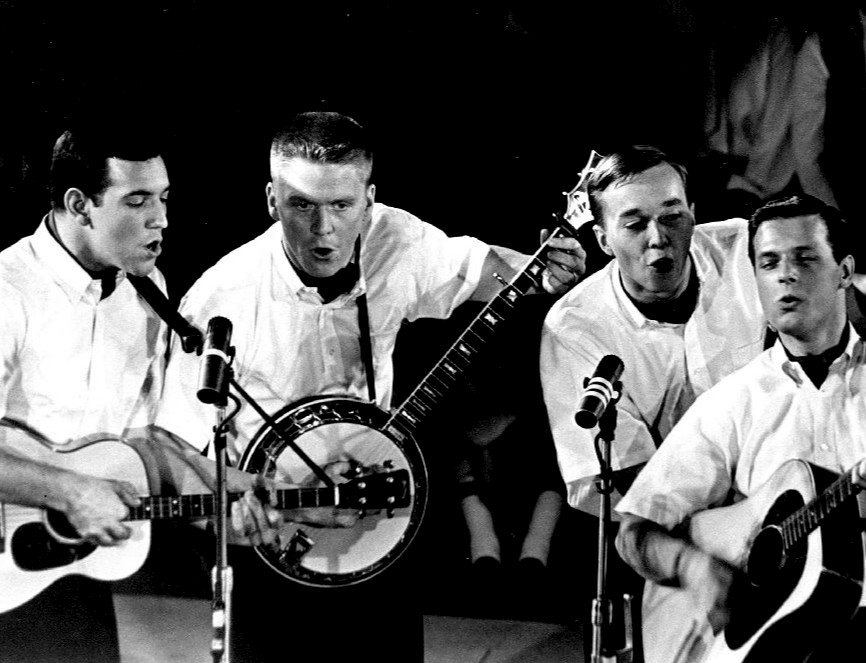
The group in 1963

=== Albums ===
Year	Album	Peak chart positions			Record Label
Year	Album	Billboard 200	Cashbox 100	Canada RPM	Record Label
1960	The Brothers Four	11	16	—	Columbia
1960	Rally 'Round!	—	—	—	Columbia
1961	Roamin'	—	—	—	Columbia
1961	Song Book	71	43	—	Columbia
1961	BMOC: Best Music On/Off Campus	4	—	—	Columbia
1962	In Person	102	—	—	Columbia
1963	The Big Folk Hits	56	43	—	Columbia
1963	Cross-Country Concert	81	—	—	Columbia
1964	Sing of Our Times	—	92	—	Columbia
1964	More Big Folk Hits	134	—	—	Columbia
1964	By Special Request	—	—	—	Columbia
1965	Try to Remember	76	83	5	Columbia
1965	The Honey Wind Blows	118	78	11	Columbia
1966	Merry Christmas	—	—	—	Columbia
1966	A Beatles' Songbook	97	—	—	Columbia
1967	A New World's Record	—	—	—	Columbia
1969	Let's Get Together	—	—	—	Columbia
1970	1970	—	—	—	Fantasy
1973	Love	—	—	—	Fantasy
"—" denotes releases that did not chart.

=== Singles ===
Year	Song titles (A-side, B-side) Both sides from same album except where indicated	Peak chart positions				Album
Year	Song titles (A-side, B-side) Both sides from same album except where indicated	US	CAN CHUM	UK	NOR	Album
1960	"Greenfields" b/w "Angelique-O"	2	2	40	1	The Brothers Four
1960	"My Tani" b/w "Ellie Lou (You Left Me There in Charleston)"	50	—	—	—	Rally 'Round!
1960	"The Green Leaves of Summer" b/w "Beautiful Brown Eyes"	65	—	—	10	BMOC: Best Music On/Off Campus
1961	"Frogg" b/w "Sweet Rosyanne" (from B.M.O.C.)	32	18	—	—	Roamin'
1961	"Nobody Knows" b/w "My Woman Left Me" (Non-album track)	—	—	—	—	Song Book
1961	"Christmas Bells" b/w "What Child Is This (Greensleeves)"	—	—	—	—	Non-album tracks
1962	"Blue Water Line" b/w "Summer Days Alone" (from Song Book)	68	—	—	—	Rally 'Round!
1962	"Theme from 'La Fayette' (Slowly Slowly)" b/w "Darlin' Sportin' Jenny" (Non-album track)	—	—	—	—	Greatest Hits
1962	"This Train" b/w "Summertime"	—	—	—	—	Non-album tracks
1962	"Land of the Midnight Sun" b/w "Five Weeks in a Balloon"	—	—	—	—	Non-album tracks
1962	"25 Minutes to Go" b/w "The Tavern Song" (from By Special Request)	—	—	—	—	Cross-Country Concert
1963	"Ringing Bells" b/w "Welcome Home Sally"	—	—	—	—	Non-album tracks
1963	"All for the Love of a Girl" b/w "55 Days at Peking"	—	—	—	—	Non-album tracks
1963	"The John B. Sails" b/w "Four Strong Winds" (from The Brothers Four Sing of Our Times)	—	—	—	—	The Big Folk Hits
1963	"Hootenanny Saturday Night" b/w "Across the Sea" (from By Special Request)	89	—	—	—	Non-album track
1965	"Somewhere" b/w "Turn Around"	—	—	—	—	The Honey Wind Blows
1965	"Lazy Harry's" b/w "Come Kiss Me Love" (from Try to Remember)	—	—	—	—	The Honey Wind Blows
1965	"Try to Remember" b/w "Sakura"	91	—	—	—	Try to Remember
1966	"Ratman and Bobbin in the Clipper Caper" b/w "Muleskinner" (from More Big Folk Hits)	—	—	—	—	Non-album track
1966	"If I Fell" b/w "Nowhere Man"	—	—	—	—	A Beatles Songbook
1966	"The Ballad of Alvarez Kelly" b/w "We Can Work It Out" (from A Beatles Songbook)	—	—	—	—	Non-album track
1966	"Changes" b/w "For Emily, Whenever I May Find Her" (Non-album track)	—	—	—	—	A New World's Record
1966	"I'll Be Home for Christmas" b/w "'Twas the Night Before Christmas"	26	—	—	—	Merry Christmas
1967	"And Then the Sun Goes Down" b/w "All I Need Is You" (from A New World's Record)	—	—	—	—	Non-album track
1967	"Walking Backwards Down the Road" b/w "The First Time Ever"	—	—	—	—	A New World's Record
1967	"Here Today and Gone Tomorrow" b/w "No Sad Songs for Me"	—	—	—	—	A New World's Record
1968	"I'm Falling Down" b/w "Sweet Dreams, Sweet Runaway Child"	—	—	—	—	Non-album track
1970	"Going Back to Big Sur" b/w "Here I Go Again"	—	—	—	—	1970

== See also ==
- List of University of Washington people
- List of people from Seattle
- List of folk musicians
