= Johnny Rivers discography =

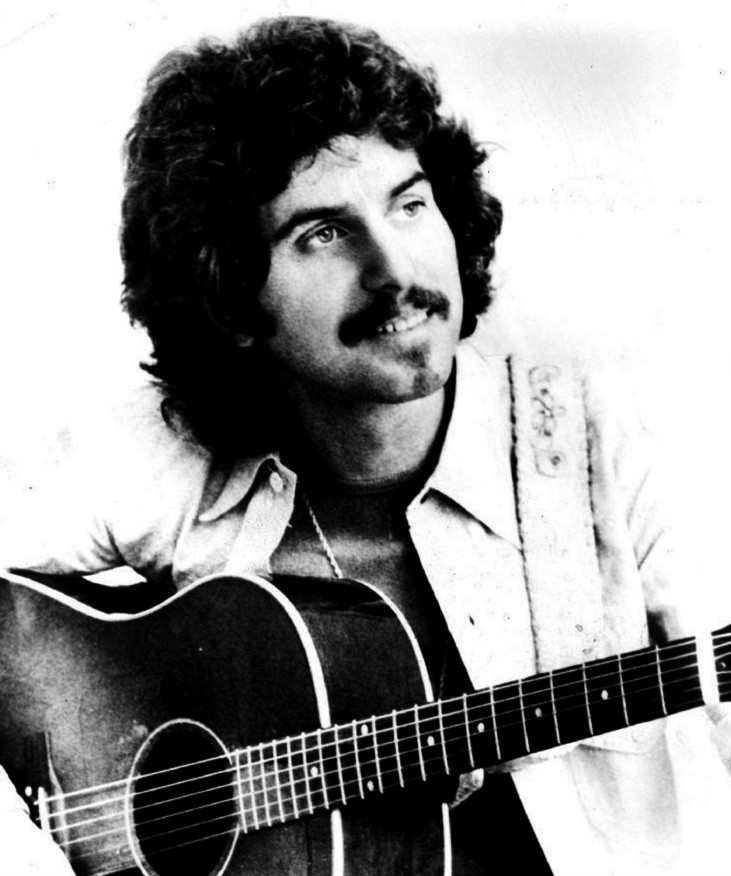
- Rivers in 1975
- Studio albums: 31
- Live albums: 9
- Compilation albums: 17
- Singles: 52
- #1 Singles: 3

This page is the comprehensive discography of American rock and roll musician Johnny Rivers.

== Studio albums ==
=== 1960s albums ===
Title	Album details	Peak chart positions		Certifications (sales threshold)
Title	Album details	US	CAN	Certifications (sales threshold)
In Action	Release date: February 1965; Label: Imperial	42	—	
Johnny Rivers Rocks the Folk	Release date: September 1965; Label: Imperial	91	—	
Changes	Release date: November 1966; Label: Imperial	33	24	
Rewind	Release date: June 1967; Label: Imperial	14	18	
Realization	Release date: May 1968; Label: Imperial; Soul City	5	22	US: Gold
"—" denotes releases that did not chart

=== 1970s albums ===
Title	Album details	Peak chart positions	
Title	Album details	US	AUS
Slim Slo Slider	Release date: July 1970; Label: Imperial	100	—
Home Grown	Release date: July 1971; Label: United Artists	148	—
L.A. Reggae	Release date: August 1972; Label: United Artists	78	—
Blue Suede Shoes	Release date: April 1973; Label: United Artists	—	—
Road	Release date: April 1974; Label: Atlantic	—	87
Rockin' Rivers	Release date: September 1974; Label: United Artists	—	—
New Lovers and Old Friends	Release date: August 1975; Label: Soul City/Epic	147	—
Help Me Rhonda [UK title of New Lovers and Old Friends]	Release date: 1975; Label: Epic	—	—
Wild Night	Release date: February 1976; Label: United Artists	—	—
Outside Help	Release date: November 1977; Label: Soul City/Big Tree	142	—
"—" denotes releases that did not chart

=== 1980s albums ===
Title	Album details
Borrowed Time	Release date: June 1980; Label: RSO
Not a Through Street	Release date: March 1983; Label: Priority; Epic

=== 1990s albums ===
Title	Album details
The Memphis Sun Recordings	Release date: January 27, 1998; Label: Soul City; Collectors' Choice
Last Train to Memphis	Release date: February 24, 1998; Label: Soul City; Collectors' Choice

=== 2000s albums ===
Title	Album details
Reinvention Highway	Release date: May 25, 2004; Label: Soul City; Collectors' Choice
Shadows on the Moon	Release date: 2009; Label: Soul City
Land of Dreams	Release date: 2020; Label: Soul City
California Rain	Release date: 2021; Label: Soul City
I'm Just Johnnie	Release date: August 29, 2025; Label: Missouri Morning, appears courtesy of Soul City; Guest artist on posthumous release of music with Johnnie Johnson, recorded 2003; Authored the songs Lo Down and Johnnie Johnson Blues

== Live albums ==
Title	Album details	Peak chart positions		Certifications (sales threshold)
Title	Album details	US	AUS	Certifications (sales threshold)
At the Whisky à Go Go	Release date: May 1964; Label: Imperial	12	—	
Here We à Go Go Again!	Release date: October 1964; Label: Imperial	38	—	
Meanwhile Back at the Whisky à Go Go	Release date: June 1965; Label: Imperial	21	—	
...And I Know You Wanna Dance	Release date: April 1966; Label: Imperial	52	—	
Whisky à Go Go Revisited	Release date: August 1967; Label: Sunset	—	—	
"Live" at the Whisky à Go Go [Germany title of Whisky à Go Go Revisited]	Release date: 1969; Label: Liberty	—	—	
Last Boogie in Paris [Recorded live 5/23/73 at the Olympia Theater in Paris, France]	Release date: 1974; Label: Atlantic; Varèse Sarabande; Soul City/Shout! Factory	—	70	
Johnny Rivers and the Bayou Beats [Recorded live 7/05/82 at Gilley's in Pasadena, Texas]	Release date: 1983; Label: Live From Gilley's	—	—	
Back at the Whisky [Recorded live 12/06-07-08/99 at the Whisky in West Hollywood, California]	Release date: Jan 30, 2001; Label: Soul City; Collectors' Choice	—	—	
"—" denotes releases that did not chart

== Compilation albums ==
List of albums, with selected chart positions and certifications
Title	Album details	Peak chart positions			Certifications
Title	Album details	US	CAN	GER	Certifications
The Sensational Johnny Rivers	Release date: August 1964; Label: Capitol	—	—	—	
Go, Johnny, Go!	Release date: September 1964; Label: United Artists	—	—	—	
Johnny Rivers' Golden Hits	Released: September 1966; Label: Imperial	29	—	—	US: Gold
The Great Johnny Rivers	Release date: October 1967 [reissues the 1964 Go, Johnny, Go! release]; Label: Unart	—	—	—	
A Touch of Gold	Released: May 1969; Label: Imperial	26	22	—	
Johnny Rivers: Superpak [2xLP]	Released: February 1973; Label: United Artists	—	—	—	
The Very Best of Johnny Rivers	Released: July 1974; Label: United Artists	—	—	—	
The Very Best of Johnny Rivers	Released: April 1975 [updates the 1974 The Very Best of Johnny Rivers release, also features new cover art]; Label: United Artists	—	—	—	
Greatest Hits	Released: 1981; Label: Imperial House/K-tel; MCA	—	—	—	
The Best of Johnny Rivers	Released: 1987; Label: EMI America	—	—	—	
Good Rockin'	Released: 1990; Label: Pair	—	—	—	
Anthology 1964–1977 [2xCD]	Released: May 1991; Label: Rhino	—	—	—	
All Time Greatest Hits	Released: 1998; Label: EMI-Capitol Special Markets	—	—	—	
Greatest Hits	Released: 1998 [reissues the 1981 Greatest Hits release]; Label: Soul City	—	—	—	
Secret Agent Man: The Ultimate Johnny Rivers Anthology 1964–2006 [2xCD]	Released: Sep 12, 2006; Label: Soul City/Shout! Factory	—	—	—	
Summer Rain: The Essential Johnny Rivers (1964–1975)	Released: Oct 30, 2006; Label: Raven	—	—	—	
Greatest Hits and More!	Released: 2011 [updates the 1998 Greatest Hits release, also features new cover art]; Label: Soul City	—	—	—	
This Could Be The One: The Early Sides 1958–1962	Released: 2013; Label: Jasmine	—	—	—	
"—" denotes releases that did not chart

== Singles ==
=== 1950s singles ===
Single	Year	Album
"Little Girl" b/w "Two By Two"	1957	Non-album singles
"Baby Come Back" b/w "Long, Long Walk"	1958	Non-album singles
"You're the One" b/w "A Hole in the Ground"	1958	Non-album singles
"Your First and Last Love" b/w "(There'll Be Bluebirds Over) The White Cliffs of Dover"	1959	Non-album singles
"Everyday" b/w "Darling Talk To Me"	1959	Non-album singles

=== 1960s singles ===
List of singles, with selected chart positions
Titles (A-side, B-side) Both sides from same album except where indicated	Year	Peak chart positions					Album
Titles (A-side, B-side) Both sides from same album except where indicated	Year	US BB	US CB	CAN	GER	AUS	Album
"The Customary Thing" b/w "Answer Me, My Love"	1960	—	—	—	—	—	Non-album tracks
"Knock Three Times" b/w "I Get So Doggone Lonesome"	1961	—	—	—	—	—	Go, Johnny, Go!
"Blue Skies" b/w "That Someone Should Be Me"	1961	—	—	—	—	—	Go, Johnny, Go!
"Long Black Veil" b/w "This Could Be the One"	1962	—	—	—	—	—	The Sensational Johnny Rivers
"If You Want It, I've Got It" b/w "My Heart Is in Your Hands"	1963	—	—	—	—	—	The Sensational Johnny Rivers
"Dream Doll" b/w "To Be Loved"	1964	—	—	—	—	—	Go, Johnny, Go!
"Memphis" b/w "It Wouldn't Happen with Me"	1964	2	2	1	1	47	At the Whisky à Go Go
"Oh What a Kiss" b/w "Knock Three Times"	1964	120	134	—	—	—	Go, Johnny, Go!
"That's My Babe" b/w "Your First and Last Love" (from Go, Johnny, Go!)	1964	—	—	—	—	—	Non-album track
"Maybellene" b/w "Walk Myself On Home"	1964	12	11	9	—	33	Here We à Go Go Again!
"Mountain of Love" b/w "Moody River"	1964	9	10/148 (B Side)	4	—	19	In Action
"Midnight Special"	1965	20	37	36	—	86	Here We à Go Go Again!
"Cupid"	1965	76	82	—	—	86	In Action
"Seventh Son" b/w "Un-Square Dance"	1965	7	7	1	—	62	Meanwhile Back at the Whisky à Go Go
"Where Have All the Flowers Gone?" b/w "Love Me While You Can" (Non-LP track)	1965	26	34	9	—	58	Johnny Rivers Rocks the Folk
"Under Your Spell Again" b/w "Long Time Man" (from Johnny Rivers Rocks the Folk)	1965	35	49	2	—	—	Non-album track
"Secret Agent Man" b/w "You Dig"	1966	3	4	4	—	78	And I Know You Wanna Dance
"(I Washed My Hands in) Muddy Water" b/w "Roogalator" (Non-LP track)	1966	19	18	25	—	59	Johnny Rivers' Golden Hits
"Poor Side of Town" b/w "A Man Can Cry" (Non-LP track)	1966	1	1	1	—	—	Changes
"Baby I Need Your Lovin'" b/w "Gettin' Ready for Tomorrow" (from Changes)	1967	3	6	—	—	44	Rewind
"The Tracks of My Tears" b/w "Rewind Medley"	1967	10	10	—	—	38	Rewind
"Summer Rain" b/w "Memory of the Coming Good" (Non-LP track)	1967	14	10	10	—	14	Realization
"Look to Your Soul" b/w "Something Strange"	1968	49	25	14	—	—	Realization
"Right Relations" b/w "A Better Life" (from A Touch of Gold)	1968	61	42	28	—	—	Non-album tracks
"These Are Not My People" b/w "Going Back to Big Sur" (from Realization)	1969	55	42	38	—	38	Non-album tracks
"Muddy River" b/w "Resurrection"	1969	41	30	33	—	90	Slim Slo Slider
"One Woman" b/w "Ode to John Lee" (from A Touch of Gold)	1969	89	69	67	—	—	Non-album track
"—" denotes a recording that did not chart or was not released in that territory.

=== 1970s singles ===
List of singles, with selected chart positions
Titles (A-side, B-side) Both sides from same album except where indicated	Year	Peak chart positions								Album
Titles (A-side, B-side) Both sides from same album except where indicated	Year	US	US CB	US AC	US Country	CAN	CAN AC	NZ	AUS	Album
"Into the Mystic" b/w "Jesus Is a Soul Man"	1970	51	38	—	—	38	—	—	64	Slim Slo Slider
"Fire and Rain" b/w "Apple Tree" (from Slim Slo Slider)	1970	94	71	—	—	—	—	—	—	Home Grown
"Sea Cruise" b/w "Our Lady of the Well" (from Home Grown)	1971	84	74	38	—	75	—	—	—	Non-album track
"Think His Name" b/w "Permanent Change"	1971	65	71	—	—	64	—	—	64	Home Grown
"Rockin' Pneumonia and the Boogie Woogie Flu" b/w "Come Home America"	1972	6	5	—	—	3	—	—	38	L.A. Reggae
"Blue Suede Shoes" b/w "Stories to a Child" (from L.A. Reggae)	1973	38	27	—	—	42	—	—	88	Blue Suede Shoes
"Searchin'/So Fine" b/w "New York City Dues" (from L.A. Reggae)	1973	113	—	—	—	90	73	—	—	Blue Suede Shoes
"Six Days on the Road" b/w "Artists and Poets"	1974	106	110	—	58	—	—	—	—	Road
"Get It Up For Love" b/w "John Lee Hooker '74"	1975	—	111	—	—	—	—	—	—	Wild Night
"Help Me, Rhonda" b/w "New Lovers and Old Friends"	1975	22	30	38	—	33	37	34	52	New Lovers and Old Friends
"Can I Change My Mind" b/w "John Lee Hooker"	1975	—	120	—	—	—	—	—	—	New Lovers and Old Friends
"Ashes and Sand" b/w "Outside Help"	1977	96	107	—	—	—	—	—	—	Outside Help
"Swayin' to the Music (Slow Dancin')" b/w "Outside Help"	1977	10	6	8	—	3	7	—	36	Outside Help
"Curious Mind (Um, Um, Um, Um, Um, Um)" b/w "Ashes and Sand"	1978	41	34	4	—	33	5	—	—	Outside Help
"—" denotes a recording that did not chart or was not released in that territory.

=== 1980s singles ===
Single	Year	Album
"China" / "The Price" (with the Muscle Shoals Sound Rhythm Section)	1980	Borrowed Time
"Romance (Give Me a Chance)" / "Don't Need No Other Now" (with the Muscle Shoals Sound Rhythm Section) (Cash Box #103)	1980	Non-album singles
"Heartbreak Love"	1984	Non-album singles
"Tearing the Drive-In Down"	1985	Non-album singles

=== 2000s singles ===
List of singles, with selected chart positions
Title	Year	Album
"The American Dream"	2009	Shadows on the Moon

=== 2010s singles ===
List of singles, with selected chart positions
Title	Year	Album
"New Home"	2011	Greatest Hits and More!
