= The Dynamic Stonewall Jackson =

Studio album by Stonewall Jackson
- Released: 1959
- Genre: Country
- Label: Columbia

The Dynamic Stonewall Jackson is the first album by country music singer Stonewall Jackson. It included Jackson's number one hit song, "Waterloo". The album was released in 1959 on the Columbia label (catalog no. CS-8186). AllMusic gave the album a rating of four-and-a-half stars. Reviewer George Bedard wrote that the album consisted of "almost all good songs, delivered in his powerful, homely but engaging voice."

== Track listing ==
Side A

1. "Waterloo" (John D. Loudermilk, Marijohn Wilkin) [2:27]
2. "Smoke Along The Tracks" [2:37]
3. "Life to Go" (George Jones) [2:33]
4. "Run" [2:28]
5. "The Carpet On The Floor" [2:25]
6. "Man Has Cried" [2:40

Side B

1. "Uncle Sam And Big John Bull" [2:14]
2. "Mary Don't You Weep" [2:21]
3. "Ward Of Broken Hearts" [2:10]
4. "Why I'm Walkin'" (Stonewall Jackson) [2:18]
5. "Let's Call It A Day" [2:38]
6. "Black Sheep" [4:28]
