= Stonewall Jackson's Greatest Hits =

Greatest hits album by Stonewall Jackson
- Released: 1965
- Genre: Country
- Label: Columbia
- Producer: Don Law, Frank Jones

Stonewall Jackson chronology
The Exciting Stonewall Jackson (1965)	Stonewall Jackson's Greatest Hits (1965)	All's Fair in Love 'n' War (1966)

Singles from Stonewall Jackson's Greatest Hits
- 1. "Lost in the Shuffle"

Stonewall Jackson's Greatest Hits is a 1965 compilation album by country musician Stonewall Jackson. The album peaked at number 20 on Billboard's country music chart.

== Track listing ==
1. "Don't Be Angry" (Wade Jackson)
2. "Life to Go" (George Jones)
3. "Waterloo" (John D. Loudermilk, Marijohn Wilkin)
4. "Smoke Along the Track" (Alan Rose)
5. "Second Choice" (Irene Stanton)
6. "Why I'm Walkin'" (Stonewall Jackson)
7. "A Wound Time Can't Erase" (Bill D. Johnson)
8. "Leona" (Cindy Walker)
9. "Old Showboat" (Fred Burch, Marijohn Wilkin)
10. "B.J. the D.J." (Hugh X. Lewis)
11. "I Washed My Hands In Muddy Water" (Joe Babcock)
12. "Lost in the Shuffle" (Ray Griff)
