= Johnny Rivers Rocks the Folk =

Studio album by Johnny Rivers
- Released: September 1965
- Genre: Pop rock; folk
- Length: 33:38
- Label: Imperial
- Producer: Lou Adler

Johnny Rivers chronology
Meanwhile Back at the Whisky à Go Go (1965)	Johnny Rivers Rocks the Folk (1965)	...And I Know You Wanna Dance (1966)

Professional ratings
Review scores
Source	Rating
AllMusic	3.5/5 stars

Johnny Rivers Rocks the Folk is the second studio album by the American musician Johnny Rivers, released in September 1965 by Imperial Records. It consists of twelve covers of traditional and contemporary folk songs, including songs by Bob Dylan, Donovan, and Pete Seeger, with modern arrangements.

== Track listing ==
=== Side one ===
1. "Tom Dooley" (Traditional) – 2:43
2. "Long Time Man" (Traditional) – 3:29
3. "Michael (Row the Boat Ashore)" (Traditional) – 2:12
4. "Blowin' in the Wind" (Bob Dylan) – 2:43
5. "Green, Green" (Barry McGuire/Randy Sparks) – 2:04
6. "Where Have All the Flowers Gone?" (Pete Seeger) – 3:52

=== Side two ===
1. "If I Had a Hammer" (Pete Seeger/Lee Hays) – 2:58
2. "Tall Oak Tree" (D. Burnette) – 2:23
3. "Catch the Wind" (Donovan) – 2:58
4. "500 Miles" (Hedy West) – 2:28
5. "Mr. Tambourine Man" (Bob Dylan) – 3:29
6. "Jailer Bring Me Water" (Bobby Darin) – 2:19

== Personnel ==
=== Musicians ===
- Johnny Rivers – vocals, electric guitar
- Chuck Day – bass guitar, guitar
- Mickey Jones – drums

=== Technical ===
- Lou Adler – producer
- Bones Howe – engineer
- Andy Wickham – liner notes
- Guy Webster – photography

== Charts ==
Chart performance for Johnny Rivers Rocks the Folk
Chart (1965)	Peak position
US Billboard Top LPs	91
