= Go Where You Wanna Go =

1965 single by the Mamas & the Papas

- US picture sleeve

Single by the Mamas & the Papas

from the album If You Can Believe Your Eyes and Ears
- B-side: "Somebody Groovy"
- Released: 1965
- Recorded: 1965
- Genre: Sunshine pop
- Length: 2:29
- Label: Dunhill Records
- Songwriter: John Phillips
- Producer: Lou Adler

The Mamas & the Papas singles chronology
"Go Where You Wanna Go" (1965)	"California Dreamin' " (1965)

Audio
- "Go Where You Wanna Go" by the Mamas & the Papas on YouTube

"Go Where You Wanna Go" is a 1965 song written by John Phillips. It was originally recorded by the Mamas & the Papas on their LP If You Can Believe Your Eyes and Ears and given limited release as a single. However, the record was withdrawn, and its A-side was reassigned to "California Dreamin'". The song later became a hit for the 5th Dimension.

== Background ==
P.F. Sloan played guitar on the song. John Phillips said that he wrote it about Michelle Phillips's affair with Russ Titelman, a songwriter and record producer.

== The Fifth Dimension version ==
"Go Where You Wanna Go"

Single by the 5th Dimension

from the album Up, Up and Away
- B-side: "Too Poor to Die"
- Released: January 1967
- Recorded: 1966
- Genre: Pop
- Label: Soul City
- Songwriter: John Phillips
- Producers: Johnny Rivers and Marc Gordon

The 5th Dimension singles chronology
"I'll Be Lovin' You Forever" (1966)	"Go Where You Wanna Go" (1967)	"Another Day, Another Heartache" (1967)

Audio
- "Go Where You Wanna Go" by the 5th Dimension on YouTube

The 5th Dimension recorded "Go Where You Wanna Go" for their debut studio album in 1967, Up, Up and Away. The song was the group's first single to chart (after their first Soul City release, "Train Keep On Movin'", was unsuccessful), reaching number 16 on the U.S. Billboard Hot 100.

Producer Johnny Rivers suggested the group record the song. According to Marilyn McCoo, "the record company wasn't going to release it as a single, but we put our whole thing into it, released it and it was a hit."

=== Charts ===
Chart (1967)	Peak position
Australia	75
Canada (CHUM Hit Parade)	9
Canada RPM 100	18
U.S. Billboard Hot 100	16
U.S. Cash Box Top 100	16

== In popular culture ==
- In his memoir Hitch-22, the journalist and writer Christopher Hitchens describes the importance of the song in motivating him to move to the United States from Britain.
