= Eddie Rubin =

American drummer (1935–2014)

- Born: Edward Donald Rubin; Cleveland, Ohio, United States
- Died: Los Angeles, California, US
- Genres: Rock and roll, jazz, pop, R&B, blues, folk
- Occupations: Musician, composer
- Instruments: Drums, percussion
- Formerly of: Don Randi Trio

Edward Donald Rubin (1935–2014) was an American jazz and rock drummer, and composer. His repertoire included rock, jazz, pop, R&B, folk, and blues, although he had a preference for jazz drumming. Rubin is best known for his performances and recordings during the 1950s, 1960s and 1970s with artists Neil Diamond, Billie Holiday, Dinah Washington, Johnny Rivers, Dexter Gordon, Ornette Coleman, Paul Revere & The Raiders and Don Randi.

== Career ==
=== 1960s ===
In Los Angeles in early 60s, Rubin performed and recorded with Don Randi, a pianist and composer who moved to Los Angeles from New York City. In 1962 Rubin was working with Randi as a band member of the Don Randi Trio, and together they recorded the album “Last Night.” “Last Night” was recorded on December 14, 1962, at Sherry's, a club in Hollywood California, and released in December 1963. Rubin also would sometimes perform with Don Randi in Las Vegas. In 1963, they played at venues such as the Kon Tiki lounge at The Castaways, a Polynesian themed resort on the Las Vegas Strip.

Later that same year, in 1963, Rubin was contacted by singer, songwriter, and guitarist Johnny Rivers, who made an offer to Rubin to play what was initially thought to be just a two or three-night gig with him. Rivers had relocated to Los Angeles from Baton Rouge Louisiana around 1961. After a couple years without much success making it as a singer and musician, Rivers was asked to perform at Gazzarri's, an Italian restaurant and music venue. Gazzarri's house band was leaving and Bill Gazzarri, the venue owner, had no other band at the time to replace them. Rivers accepted Gazzarri's offer to perform temporarily until a new house band was found. However, Rivers did not have anyone to perform with and needed to find other musicians to put a band together. Rivers met and knew Eddie Rubin from sitting in and watching his performances with the Don Randi Trio at Sherry's Lounge, and decided to contact him to be his drummer. Rubin accepted River's offer. Eddie Rubin and Rivers, with no time to rehearse, performed together as a duo (just guitar and drums) at Gazzarri's and word quickly got out. In the book Straight Whisky, author Erick Quisling states, “The two men set up their instruments at Gazzarri’s,” began playing, and “what happened after that was pure magic.” Much to their surprise, by the second night people watching got up and started dancing. By the third night or later of performing, huge crowds and celebrities started gathering in Gazzarri's to hear them play. In his book The Music of Johnny Rivers, Robert Reynolds described the sound of the music as “being driven with a catchy pulsating rhythm.” After initial success, Gazzarri offered Rivers more work and allowed bassist Joe Osborn to join him and Rubin. Elmer Valentine, a club promoter, caught on to Rubin and Rivers’ popularity at Gazarri's, and asked the band to perform on opening night at his new club he was planning to open on the Hollywood Sunset Strip. The new club planning to open was called the Whisky a Go Go. The band accepted. On opening night Eddie Rubin and Johnny Rivers were the very first artists to ever perform at the Whisky a Go Go, which sparked the Whisky's rise to one of the most famous music venues worldwide. On opening night on January 15, 1964, the line of people waiting to get in stretched all the way around the block. Inside, there were go-go dancers in cages on an elevated platform above the stage. Rubin and Rivers became the Whisky's house band for the next two years with a packed house every night, attracting both locals and numerous celebrities. The Beatles showed up to the Whisky a Go Go one evening in the summer of 1964 after performing at the Hollywood Bowl, during their first tour in the United States. The Beatles were visiting Sunset Strip and wanted to see what all the hype about Eddie Rubin and Johnny Rivers at the newly opened Whisky a Go Go was all about. During this first year run at the Whisky in 1964, Eddie and Johnny recorded two albums together live at the Whisky. The first live album, At the Whisky a Go Go, was released in February 1964 just one month after the Whisky's opening. The album received a Gold award, and the hit single “Memphis,” included on the album, was certified as a Gold single. The second live album, Here We a Go Go Again!, was released in April 1964, and included the hit single “Maybellene.”

=== 1970s ===
After years of performing and touring with Johnny Rivers throughout the United States and foreign countries, Eddie Rubin was in demand as a drummer. From 1969 to 1971, Eddie Rubin performed and recorded with singer and songwriter Neil Diamond. Neil Diamond wrote his famous hit song “Sweet Caroline” in 1969 and after its massive success that same year, Diamond's success was taking off. Diamond relocated to Los Angeles from New York in 1969 and was in need of a promising new band he could tour with. In July 1969 Eddie Rubin was contacted by Diamond and his manager, who wanted Rubin as the band's drummer. Rubin agreed to join, and immediately Rubin, Diamond, and the rest of the band prepared to go on tour. In late September 1969 they did a six-night performance at the Troubadour nightclub in Hollywood California, and before the end of the year toured throughout the United States in Maryland, Utah, Texas, Pennsylvania, and many other states throughout the south. In the beginning of 1970, Rubin toured more states with Diamond and then in March 1970 throughout Canada. Later in the summer, July 1970, Eddie Rubin performed with Diamond at the Troubadour (West Hollywood, California) once again. It was here at the Troubadour on July 15, 1970, that Rubin recorded the hit live album Gold: Recorded Live at the Troubadour with Diamond's band. This album, released on August 22, 1970, included the hit songs “Sweet Caroline,” “Solitary Man,” and “Cherry Cherry.” The album was certified Gold by the RIAA in November 1970, and eventually went 2x Multi-Platinum.

== Discography ==
=== Albums ===
- 1963: Last Night, Don Randi Trio
- 1964: At the Whisky a Go Go, Johnny Rivers
- 1964: Here We a Go Go Again!, Johnny Rivers
- 1964: John Lee Hooker, Johnny Rivers
- 1967: Whisky A Go-Go Revisited, Johnny Rivers
- 1970: Gold: Recorded Live at the Troubadour, Neil Diamond
- 1971: Non Stop Dancing At The Whisky A Go Go, Johnny Rivers
- 1979: MUH Vol. 1 Live Aus Dem Musikalischen Unter Holz In München (LP), Various
- 1982: 1966, The Leaves
- 1998: The Yellow Balloon, The Yellow Balloon

== Filmography ==
List of film and television appearances
Year	Title	Role	Notes
1964	Shindig!	Himself	Season 1, Episode 2
1966	The Red Skelton Show	Himself, Drummer	2 Episodes
1966	The Hollywood Palace	Himself, Drummer	Season 3, Episode 32

== Sources ==
1. Clash, Jim. “Johnny Rivers On Whiskey a Go Go Club, Bob Dylan as First Rapper.” Forbes, Forbes Magazine, 16 May 2015.
2. Louisiana Music Hall of Fame. (n.d.). Retrieved August 2, 2019, from http://louisianamusichalloffame.org/content/view/95/114/.
3. Harris, George W. “Johnny Rivers: A Life of Danger.” Jazzweekly.com, 1 Mar. 2014.
4. “Johnny Rivers Biography.”
5. Junior, Chris. “Johnny Rivers Lets the Whisky Flow.” Goldmine Magazine, 25 Sept. 2012.
6. Kelemen, Matt. “Q&A: Johnny Rivers.” The Magazine - Las Vegas Weekly, 19 Feb. 2016.
7. Lowman, Rob. “Johnny Rivers, Jimmy Webb Celebrate Whisky a Go Go’s 50th Anniversary, plus a Look Back at the Sunset Strip.” Daily News, Daily News, 10 Jan. 2014.
8. Martino, Alison. “Vintage Los Angeles: How Go Go Dancing Took Off at the Whisky.” Los Angeles Magazine, 13 Jan. 2014.
9. Phill. “Will Johnny Rivers Ever Flow into The Rock Hall of Fame?” Goldmine Magazine, 14 Apr. 2011.
10. Ragogna, Mike. “From Whisky a Go Go to the Royal Studios: Conversations with Johnny Rivers and Paul Rodgers, Plus Roy Orbison Reissued.” HuffPost, HuffPost, 31 Dec. 2013.
11. Randi, Don, and Karen Nishimura. You've Heard These Hands: From the Wall of Sound to the Wrecking Crew and Other Incredible Stories. Hal Leonard Books, 2015
12. “Rock & Roll Geography: Whisky a Go Go.” Mind Smoke Music, https://msmokemusic.com/blog/blog/rock-roll-geography-whisky-a-go-go-los-angeles-ca
13. “Secret Agent Man.” Jerry Reuss Las Vegas, NV Jerry Reuss, 2009, https://www.jerryreuss.com/johnnyriverssecretagentman.html.
14. “The Original Neil Diamond Home Page, since 1995.” The Original Neil Diamond Home Page, since 1995, http://www.neildiamondhomepage.com/band.htm.
