= Up, Up and Away (The 5th Dimension album) =

1967 album by the 5th Dimension

Up – Up and Away

Studio album by the 5th Dimension
- Released: April 1967
- Recorded: April 1966 – March 11, 1967
- Studios: United Western, Hollywood, California
- Genre: Pop
- Length: 40:03
- Label: Soul City
- Producers: Johnny Rivers and Marc Gordon

The 5th Dimension chronology
Up – Up and Away (1967)	The Magic Garden (1967)

Singles from Up – Up and Away
- 1. "Go Where You Wanna Go" Released: 1966; 2. "Another Day, Another Heartache" Released: 1967; 3. "Up – Up and Away" Released: 1967

"Up – Up and Away"
The 5th Dimension's "Up – Up and Away" from Up – Up and Away

Professional ratings
Review scores
Source	Rating
AllMusic	3/5 stars

Up – Up and Away is the debut album by the American pop group the 5th Dimension, released in April 1967. The title track was released as a single and became a major pop hit.

The group's first single release on Soul City Records, "Train Keep On Moving/I'll Be Loving You Forever" was not a success, and is not included in the album. Both songs appear as bonus tracks on a later CD reissue of the album.

The first single released from this album, "Go Where You Wanna Go", was initially recorded by the Mamas & the Papas and appears on their first album. The 5th Dimension's version became a top 20 hit in the US, reaching No. 16. The group's second release, "Another Day, Another Heartache", also charted, peaking at No. 45.

It was their third release, the ubiquitous "Up, Up and Away", that launched both the group and the song's writer, Jimmy Webb, into super-stardom. The group and the song amassed a total of five different Grammy Awards between them in 1968. Many different artists have since recorded versions of the song.

The group appeared on many television shows of the day, including The Hollywood Palace, Shebang, and particularly The Ed Sullivan Show, where they became a favorite of the host. Performances exist of several of the album's songs from these myriad shows, including "Go Where You Wanna Go", "Another Day, Another Heartache", "Pattern People", "California My Way", and the title track of the album.

== Track listing ==
Side One

1. "Up, Up and Away" (Jimmy Webb) – 2:45
2. "Another Day, Another Heartache" (Steve Barri, P.F. Sloan) – 2:37
3. "Which Way to Nowhere" (Jimmy Webb) – 3:08
4. "California My Way" (Willie Hutch) – 2:56
5. "Misty Roses" (Tim Hardin) – 2:46

Side Two

1. "Go Where You Wanna Go" (John Phillips) – 2:22
2. "Never Gonna Be the Same" (Jimmy Webb) – 2:26
3. "Pattern People" (Jimmy Webb) – 3:02
4. "Rosecrans Blvd." (Jimmy Webb) – 2:54
5. "Learn How to Fly" (Willie Hutch) – 3:01
6. "Poor Side of Town" (Lou Adler, Johnny Rivers) – 3:21

CD Reissue Bonus Tracks

1. "I'll Be Loving You Forever" (Willie Hutch) – 3:11
2. "Train Keep on Movin'" (Willie Hutch) – 2:47
3. "Too Poor to Die" (Marc Gordon, Willie Hutch) – 2:46

== Personnel ==
The 5th Dimension

- Billy Davis Jr. - lead vocals (track 12), background vocals
- Florence LaRue - background vocals
- Marilyn McCoo - lead vocals (track 10), background vocals
- Lamonte McLemore - background vocals
- Ron Townson - background vocals

Additional personnel

- Al Casey - guitar, "eastern sounds" performed by
- Johnny Rivers, P. F. Sloan, Tommy Tedesco - guitar
- Joe Osborn - bass, guitar
- Hal Blaine - drums, percussion
- Larry Knechtel - piano, keyboards
- Jimmy Webb - musical conductor, keyboards

== Production ==
- Producers: Johnny Rivers, Marc Gordon
- Mastering: Elliot Federman
- Project coordination: Arlessa Barnes, Glenn Delgado, Christina DeSimone, Robin Diamond, Mandana Eidgah, Karyn Friedland, Felicia Gearhart, Laura Gregory, Jeremy Holiday, Robin Manning, Brooke Nochomson, Ed Osborne, Larry Parra, Dana Renert, Bill Stafford, Steve Strauss
- Production assistants: Bones Howe, Tom Tierney, Russ Wapensky
- Archivist: Joanna Feltman
- Transfers: Mike Hartry
- Music arranged by: Jimmy Webb
- Horns & Strings arranged by: Marty Paich, tracks 1, 2, 5, 6
- Art direction: Mathieu Bitton, Wardy Woodward
- Design: Mathieu Bitton, Wayne Kimbell
- Cover photo: Bernard Yeszin
- Photography: Rob Santers
- Liner notes: Mike Ragehoa

== Charts ==
=== Album ===
Weekly chart peaks for Up, Up and Away
Chart (1967)	Peak position
US Billboard Top LP's	8
US Billboard Hot R&B LP's	10
US Cashbox Top 100 Albums	10
CAN RPM Top LP's	6

Year-end positions for Up, Up and Away
Chart (1967)	Peak position
Billboard 200	41
Cashbox 100	60

=== Singles ===
Billboard (United States)

Year	Single	Chart	Position
1967	"Go Where You Wanna Go"	Hot 100 (Pop)	16
1967	"Another Day, Another Heartache"	Hot 100 (Pop)	45
1967	"Up – Up and Away"	Hot 100 (Pop)	7

== Awards ==
=== 10th Annual Grammy Awards ===
Year	Nominee / work	Award	Result
1968	"Up – Up and Away"	Record of the Year	Won
1968	"Up – Up and Away"	Song of the Year	Won
1968	"Up – Up and Away"	Best Pop Performance by a Duo or Group with Vocals	Won
1968	"Up – Up and Away"	Best Performance by a Vocal Group	Won
1968	"Up – Up and Away"	Best Performance by a Chorus	Won
1968	"Up – Up and Away"	Best Contemporary Song	Won
1968	Up – Up and Away	Best Pop Vocal Album	Nominated
1968	Up – Up and Away	Best Recording Package	Nominated
1968	The 5th Dimension	Best New Artist	Nominated

== Certifications ==
Region	Certification	Certified units/sales
United States (RIAA)	Gold	500,000^{^}
^{^} Shipments figures based on certification alone.
