= ...And I Know You Wanna Dance =

Live album by Johnny Rivers
- Released: 1966
- Recorded: 1966
- Venues: Whisky a Go Go, Los Angeles, California
- Genres: Pop, rock and roll
- Length: 36:43
- Label: Imperial
- Producer: Lou Adler

Johnny Rivers chronology
| Johnny Rivers Rocks the Folk (1965) | ...And I Know You Wanna Dance (1966) | Changes (1966) |

Professional ratings
Review scores
| Source | Rating |
|---|---|
| Allmusic | 3.5 |

...And I Know You Wanna Dance was Johnny Rivers's sixth official album, and was his fourth live album. It was recorded live at the Whisky a Go Go in Los Angeles, California. The album was on the Billboard Charts for 21 weeks, and reached No. 52. It included the most famous recording of "Secret Agent Man" which peaked at No. 3 on the Billboard Hot 100.

== Track listing ==
=== Side one ===
| No. | Title | Writer(s) | Length |
|---|---|---|---|
| 1. | "The Snake" | Oscar Brown Jr. | 3:04 |
| 2. | "I Can't Help Myself" | Holland-Dozier-Holland | 3:05 |
| 3. | "You Must Believe" | Curtis Mayfield | 3:20 |
| 4. | "Uptight (Everything's Alright)" | Stevie Wonder, Sylvia Moy, Henry Cosby | 3:07 |
| 5. | "Respect" | Otis Redding | 1:47 |
| 6. | "In the Midnight Hour" | Wilson Pickett, Steve Cropper | 2:32 |

=== Side two ===
| No. | Title | Writer(s) | Length |
|---|---|---|---|
| 1. | "Secret Agent Man" | Steve Barri, P. F. Sloan | 3:07 |
| 2. | "Every Day I Have to Cry" | Arthur Alexander | 2:43 |
| 3. | "You've Lost That Lovin' Feelin'" | Mann, Spector, Weil | 5:59 |
| 4. | "Foolkiller" | Mose Allison | 3:24 |
| 5. | "Run For Your Life" | Lennon-McCartney | 2:29 |
| 6. | "You Dig (***)" | Chuck Day, Mickey Jones | 2:10 |

(***) Edit fade-out stereo. The full 6:15 minutes only mono version was released as B-side of single "Secret Agent Man" the same year.

== Personnel ==
=== Musicians ===
- Johnny Rivers – vocals, electric guitar
- Chuck Day – bass guitar, guitar
- Mickey Jones – drums
- Larry Knechtel – organ
- Joe Osborn – bass guitar, guitar

=== Technical ===
- Lou Adler – producer
- Bones Howe – engineer
- Woody Woodward – art direction
- Lulu – cover design
- Andy Wickham – liner notes
- Ken Kim – cover photography
- Guy Webster – photography (liner)
