= Melvin Endsley =

American singer-songwriter (1934–2004)

Melvin Endsley (January 30, 1934 – August 16, 2004) was a musician, singer, and songwriter best known for writing the song "Singing the Blues", along with over 400 songs recorded by hundreds of artists since 1956. Some of the artists who have recorded his songs include Johnny Cash, Marty Robbins, Andy Williams, Paul McCartney, Stonewall Jackson, and Ricky Skaggs. At the beginning of his career, Endsley recorded at studios including RCA and MGM, but his vocal recordings were commercially unsuccessful. In 1998, he was inducted into the Arkansas Entertainers Hall of Fame.

== Early life ==
Endsley was born in Drasco, Arkansas, on January 30, 1934. When he was three years old, he contracted polio, requiring him to use a wheelchair for the rest of his life. From the age of 11, he spent three years in the Crippled Children's Hospital in Memphis. While there, he listened to country music on the radio and taught himself to play the guitar. After returning to Drasco, he began to play on radio shows. By the time he was 20, his song, "It Happens Every Time", caught the attention of Don Gibson and Dorsey Burnette.

== Career ==
Endsley wrote "Singing the Blues" in 1954. The following year, he took the song to Nashville's Grand Ole Opry to pitch it backstage. In 1956, Marty Robbins recorded the song, which is credited with boosting Robbins' career. Endsley's writing talents were in high demand after Robbins's success with "Singing the Blues". The song became a number-one record for Marty Robbins, Guy Mitchell, and Tommy Steele on various music genre charts.

In October 1956, Guy Mitchell released "Singing the Blues", after which it spent nine weeks at number one on the U.S. Billboard chart from December 8, 1956, to February 2, 1957. Mitchell's version was also number one in the U.K. for three (non-consecutive) weeks in early 1957. In late 1956 and early 1957, Marty Robbins' version made it to number one on the Billboard Hot Country Songs chart for 13 weeks, peaking at number 17 on the U.S. pop charts.

Additional memorable versions of "Singing the Blues" include Bill Haley & His Comets' 1960 recording, a 1963 version by Dean Martin, a 1971 version by Black Oak Arkansas, and a 1981 version by Dave Edmunds. The song also made an appearance on an episode of I Love Lucy, when it was sung by Vivian Vance and William Frawley for a Ford Motor Company television commercial promoting the Edsel. In 1991, the song was performed live by Paul McCartney on the MTV show Unplugged and included on the soundtrack, Unplugged (The Official Bootleg).

Endsley had further success with the song "Love Me to Pieces", which was recorded by Jill Corey, Janis Martin, and Janet Eden in 1957. Robbins and Guy Mitchell had hits with "Knee Deep in the Blues" in 1957 and 1991. Andy Williams recorded "I Like Your Kind of Love" in 1957, while The Browns covered "I'd Just Be Fool Enough" in 1966. Other hits include "I Ain't Getting Nowhere With You" and "Bring the Blues to My Door."

Endsley himself had recorded "I Like Your Kind of Love" and "I'd Just Be Fool Enough" while he was under contract with RCA in 1957–58. When his contract with RCA ended, he signed with MGM for a year, followed by a two-year stint with Hickory from 1960 to 1961. He also recorded occasionally on his own record label, Mel-Ark. His last major hit was with "Why I'm Walkin'", recorded by Stonewall Jackson in 1960. Over the course of Endsley's career, he wrote over 400 songs.

== Personal life ==
Endsley married Carolyn Matthews on March 15, 1960; they had four children.
