= Life to Go =

Single by Stonewall Jackson

from the album The Dynamic Stonewall Jackson
- B-side: "Misery Known as Heartache"
- Released: September 22, 1958
- Recorded: 1958
- Genre: Country
- Length: 2:28
- Label: Columbia
- Songwriter(s): George Jones

Stonewall Jackson singles chronology
"Life to Go" (1958)	"Waterloo" (1959)

"Life to Go" is a country music song written by George Jones, performed by Stonewall Jackson, and released in 1958 on the Columbia label (catalog no. 4–41257).

The lyrics are told from the point of view of a man who has served 18 years in prison and still has "life to go". The song recounts the incident in which he stabbed and killed an old friend in an argument after drinking at the honky tonks. He hasn't heard from his wife in a long time and wonders about his little girl who is now grown.

It debuted on the Billboard country and western chart in November 1958, peaked at the No. 2 spot, and remained on the chart for a total of 23 weeks. It was Jackson's first record to enter the Top 40.

The song's popularity led to an answer song by Billie Morgan titled "Life to Live". Morgan's song tells of the wife's suffering while her husband was in prison and of their reunion when he is released.
