= Meanwhile Back at the Whisky à Go Go =

Live album by Johnny Rivers
- Released: June 1965
- Recorded: 1965
- Venues: Whisky a Go Go, Los Angeles, California
- Genres: Pop, rock and roll
- Length: 39:08
- Label: Imperial
- Producer: Lou Adler

Johnny Rivers chronology
In Action (1965)	Meanwhile Back at the Whisky à Go Go (1965)	Johnny Rivers Rocks the Folk (1965)

Singles from Meanwhile Back at the Whisky à Go Go
- 1. "Seventh Son" Released: May 11, 1965

Professional ratings
Review scores
Source	Rating
Allmusic	4/5 stars
Record Mirror	3/5 stars

Meanwhile Back at the Whisky à Go Go was Johnny Rivers's fourth official album, and was his third recorded live at the Whisky a Go Go in Los Angeles. The album was on the Billboard charts for 21 weeks reaching #21 on August 30, 1965. Rivers' version of "Seventh Son" peaked on the Billboard charts at #7.

== Track listing ==
=== Side one ===
1. "Seventh Son" (Willie Dixon) – 2:45
2. "Greenback Dollar" (Hoyt Axton, Kennard Ramsey) – 3:19
3. "Stop! In the Name of Love" (Holland–Dozier–Holland) – 3:07
4. "Un-Square Dance" (Rivers) – 0:45
5. "Silver Threads and Golden Needles" (Jack Rhodes, Dick Reynolds) – 2:59
6. "Land of 1000 Dances" (Chris Kenner) – 5:49

=== Side two ===
1. "Parchman Farm" (Mose Allison) – 3:41
2. "I'll Cry Instead" (Lennon–McCartney) – 2:53
3. "Break Up" (Charlie Rich) – 3:05
4. "Work Song" (Nat Adderley) – 4:22
5. "Stagger Lee" (Herb Wiedoeft) – 3:14
6. "Susie Q" (Dale Hawkins) – 4:09

== Personnel ==
=== Musicians ===
- Mickey Jones – drums
- Joe Osborn – bass guitar
- Johnny Rivers – vocals, electric guitar

=== Technical ===
- Lou Adler – producer, liner notes
- Wally Heider – remote engineer
- Bones Howe - studio engineer
- Studio Five – cover
