= Rewind (Johnny Rivers album) =

Studio album by Johnny Rivers
- Released: June 1967
- Genres: Pop rock, R&B, soul
- Length: 30:53
- Label: Imperial
- Producer: Lou Adler

Johnny Rivers chronology
Changes (1966)	Rewind (1967)	Realization (1968)

Professional ratings
Review scores
Source	Rating
Allmusic	3

Rewind is the fourth studio album by the American musician Johnny Rivers, released in 1967 by Imperial Records. The album includes cover versions of "Baby, I Need Your Lovin'" and "The Tracks of My Tears". Produced by Lou Adler with arrangements by Jimmy Webb, who wrote seven of the songs. Noted Los Angeles session musicians the Wrecking Crew provided the music. The album spent 21 weeks on the Billboard albums chart and peaked at #14 . "Tracks of my Tears" spent nine weeks on the Billboard Hot 100 and peaked at #9, while "Baby I Need Your Lovin'" spent eleven weeks and peaked at #3.

== Reception ==
In his review in AllMusic, Zach Curd called Rewind, with its "big, clean production, and quality L.A. session musicians", a "great collection of blue-eyed soul and rock." Curd concluded that the album was "a solid, tight recording, with excellent production and inventive arrangements provided by Webb."

== Track listing ==
All songs written by Jimmy Webb except where noted.

=== Side one ===
1. "The Tracks of My Tears" (Warren "Pete" Moore, Smokey Robinson, Marvin Tarplin) – 2:53
2. "Carpet Man" – 3:02
3. "Tunesmith" – 3:10
4. "Sidewalk Song / 27th Street" – 2:25
5. "It'll Never Happen Again" (Tim Hardin) – 3:25
6. "Do What You Gotta Do" – 2:19

=== Side two ===
1. "Baby I Need Your Lovin'" (Lamont Dozier, Brian Holland, Eddie Holland) – 3:08
2. "For Emily, Whenever I May Find Her" (Paul Simon) – 2:47
3. "Rosecrans Boulevard" – 2:31
4. "The Eleventh Song" – 2:19
5. "Sweet Smiling Children" – 2:10

== Personnel ==
=== Musicians ===
- Johnny Rivers – vocals, guitar
- The Blossoms – backing vocals
- Larry Knechtel – piano
- Mike Deasy Sr. – guitar
- Joe Osborn – bass guitar
- Hal Blaine – drums
- Mike Deasy Jr. – vocals

=== Technical ===
- Lou Adler – producer
- Armin Steiner, Michael Lietz – engineers
- Jimmy Webb – arranger, conductor, liner notes
- Marty Paich – horns and strings arranger/conductor
- Woody Woodward – art direction
- Bernard Yeszin, George Rodriguez, Ivan Nagy – photography
