= Here We à Go Go Again! =

Live album by Johnny Rivers
- Released: 1964
- Recorded: 1964
- Venues: Whisky a Go Go, Los Angeles, California
- Genres: Pop, rock and roll
- Length: 39:50
- Label: Imperial
- Producer: Lou Adler

Johnny Rivers chronology
| At the Whisky à Go Go (1964) | Here We à Go Go Again! (1964) | In Action! (1965) |

Professional ratings
Review scores
| Source | Rating |
|---|---|
| Allmusic | 3 |

Here We à Go Go Again! is Johnny Rivers's second official album, and like his first album, At the Whisky à Go Go, it was recorded live at the Whisky a Go Go in Los Angeles, California. The album was on the Billboard Charts for 23 weeks and reached #38 on December 12, 1964. The album spawned two hit singles: "Maybellene", #12 on the Billboard Hot 100, and "Midnight Special", #20 in 1965.

== Track listing ==
1. "Maybellene" (Chuck Berry) – 2:12
2. "Dang Me" (Roger Miller) – 2:31
3. "(Hello) Josephine" (Fats Domino, Dave Bartholomew) – 2:31
4. "High Heel Sneakers" (Tommy Tucker) – 3:46
5. "Can't Buy Me Love" (Lennon–McCartney) – 2:58
6. "I've Got a Woman" (Ray Charles, Renald Richard) – 6:20
7. "Baby What You Want Me to Do" (Jimmy Reed) – 5:42
8. "Midnight Special" (traditional) – 2:28
9. "Roll Over Beethoven" (Chuck Berry) – 2:53
10. "Walk Myself on Home" (Joe Osborn, Eddie Rubin) – 2:34
11. "Johnny B. Goode" (Chuck Berry) – 2:47
12. "Whole Lotta Shakin' Goin' On" (Dave "Curlee" Williams, James Faye "Roy" Hall) – 3:08

== Personnel ==
- Guitar: Tay Uhler, Johnny Rivers
- Bass: Joe Osborn
- Drums: Eddie Rubin
- Piano: Joe Sample
