= The Seventh Son =

1955 song written by Willie Dixon

Single by Willie Mabon
- B-side: "Lucinda"
- Released: 1955
- Recorded: Chicago, 1955
- Genre: Rhythm and blues
- Length: 3:01
- Label: Chess
- Songwriter: Willie Dixon
- Producers: Leonard Chess; Phil Chess

Willie Mabon singles chronology
"Come On, Baby" (1955)	"The Seventh Son" (1955)	"Knock on Wood" (1956)

"The Seventh Son" (also listed as "Seventh Son") is a rhythm and blues song written by Willie Dixon. The title refers to the seventh son of a seventh son of folklore, which Dixon referenced previously in his "Hoochie Coochie Man". The lyrics include:

Now everybody's talkin' about the seventh son
But in the whole round world, there is only one
I'm the one, yes, I'm the one
I'm the one they call the seventh son

In 1955, Willie Mabon was the first to record it. The jazz pianist and singer Mose Allison released it as a single in 1959 and on an album in 1964, calling it one of his "featured numbers". Johnny Rivers recorded the song as the lead track for his album Meanwhile Back at the Whisky à Go Go in 1965. Also released as a single, "The Seventh Son" was one of Rivers' most popular singles.

== Willie Mabon song ==
In his autobiography, Dixon described writing several tunes for Mabon, including "The Seventh Son". He noted that Mabon stuck to his arrangement, unlike others who recorded the song, and commented on its background:

The Seventh Son is kind of a historical idea. In New Orleans and Algiers, Louisiana, they have these people calling themselves born for good luck because they're the seventh sister or seventh brother or the seventh child. The world has made a pattern out of this seven as a lucky number. Most people think the seventh child has the extra wisdom and knowledge to influence other people.

Chess Records released the song as a single with "Lucinda" as the B-side, however, it did not reach the record charts.

== Johnny Rivers rendition ==
"The Seventh Son"

Single by Johnny Rivers

from the album Meanwhile Back at the Whisky à Go Go
- B-side: "Un-Square Dance"
- Released: May 11, 1965
- Recorded: 1965
- Venue: Whisky a Go Go, West Hollywood, California
- Genre: Rock
- Length: 2:45
- Label: Imperial
- Songwriter: Willie Dixon
- Producer: Lou Adler

Johnny Rivers singles chronology
"Mountain of Love" (1964)	"The Seventh Son" (1965)	"Where Have All the Flowers Gone?" (1965)

In the early 1960s, Johnny Rivers recorded several albums at the Whisky a Go Go, a popular music venue in West Hollywood, California. "The Seventh Son" was included as the opening track on Rivers' 1965 release Meanwhile Back at the Whisky à Go Go. In an AllMusic album review, Bruce Eder noted, "[On] the opening track, 'Seventh Son' – Rivers takes an approach that manages to intersect with swamp rock, white soul, and garage punk, all neatly wrapped up in three minutes so potent that it shot to the Top Ten on the Billboard Hot 100." The single version peaked at number seven on July 2, 1965, and topped RPM magazine's Top Singles chart.
