= Poor Side of Town =

1966 single by Johnny Rivers

Single by Johnny Rivers

from the album Changes
- B-side: "A Man Can Cry"
- Released: August 1966
- Genre: Baroque pop; orchestral pop
- Length: 3:48 (album version); 3:03 (single version)
- Label: Imperial
- Songwriters: Johnny Rivers; Lou Adler
- Producer: Lou Adler

Johnny Rivers singles chronology
"(I Washed My Hands in) Muddy Water" (1966)	"Poor Side of Town" (1966)	"Baby I Need Your Lovin'" (1967)

"Poor Side of Town" is a song by Johnny Rivers that reached number one on the U.S. Billboard Hot 100 and the RPM Canadian Chart in November 1966. The song marked a turning point in Rivers' career that saw him move away from his earlier rock and roll style toward pop ballads.

== Song ==
Johnny Rivers would recall of "Poor Side of Town": "I don’t know what inspired it…It was not from any personal experience, because I was living in Beverly Hills." Although he'd describe it as "an easy song to write", Rivers would say the song: "took…about five months to write…I kept writing little bits and pieces of it." With the parent album of "Poor Side of Town," Changes, Rivers shifted from southern rock to an orchestral pop sound with a string and brass arrangement by Marty Paich who had orchestrated recent Top 5 hits by the Mamas & the Papas. The LA Phil musicians who had played on the Mamas & Papas tracks also played on Changes.

The single edit of "Poor Side of Town" reduces the coda of the album track which follows the repeated lyric "Oh with you by my side". After this line, the verse finishes, the guitar riff and the sung introduction of the scatting repeats, and the song fades out.

== Charts ==
Chart (1966)	Peak position
Canada (RPM)	1
US Billboard Hot 100	1

== Cover versions ==
- The 5th Dimension recorded the song for the 1967 album, Up, Up and Away.
- Al Wilson released a version of the song as a single from his 1968 album, Searching for the Dolphins. It reached No. 75 in the U.S. and No. 54 in Canada in 1969.
- Beverly Bremers released a version of the song on her 1972 album, I'll Make You Music.
- Joe Stampley released a version of the song as a single from the 1983 album, Backslidin'.
- Lynn Anderson recorded a version of the song on her 1980 album Even Cowgirls Get The Blues
- Nick Lowe released a version of the song on his 2001 album, The Convincer.
- Mark Oliver Everett (better known as Eels) recorded an acoustic version of the song backed by a mini orchestra on his 2006 live album, Eels with Strings: Live at Town Hall.
- Bruce Springsteen recorded the song in 1995, for an album that was not released until his Tracks II: The Lost Albums box set was released in 2025.

== Personnel ==
- Lead vocals and guitar by Johnny Rivers.
- Piano by Larry Knechtel
- Bass by Joe Osborn
- Drums by Hal Blaine
- Background vocals by The Blossoms: Darlene Love, Fanita James, and Jean King.
- Written by Johnny Rivers and Lou Adler.
- Produced by Lou Adler.
