= Baby I Need Your Loving =

1964 single by the Four Tops

- Side A of the Australian single

Single by Four Tops

from the album Four Tops
- B-side: "Call on Me"
- Released: July 10, 1964
- Recorded: July 8, 1964
- Studio: Hitsville U.S.A. (Studio A)
- Genre: Pop
- Length: 2:45
- Label: Motown
- Songwriter: Holland–Dozier–Holland
- Producers: Brian Holland, Lamont Dozier

Four Tops singles chronology
"Pennies from Heaven" (1962)	"Baby I Need Your Loving" (1964)	"Without the One You Love (Life's Not Worth While)" (1964)

"Baby I Need Your Loving" is a song recorded by the Four Tops for the Motown label. Written and produced by Motown's main production team Holland–Dozier–Holland, the song was the group's first Motown single and their first pop top 20 hit, making it to number 11 on the US Billboard Hot 100 and number four in Canada in the fall of 1964. It was also their first million-selling hit single.

Cash Box described it as "an intriguing rock-a-cha-cha beat pleader...that [the Four Tops] carve out with solid sales authority." Rolling Stone ranked the Four Tops' original version of the song at No. 400 on their list of the 500 Greatest Songs of All Time.

In Australia on the Stateside label, "Baby I Need Your Loving" reached No. 50 on the KMR chart and spent just 6 weeks in the chart of which it entered on January 30, 1964.

== Personnel ==
- Lead vocals by Levi Stubbs.
- Background vocals by Renaldo "Obie" Benson, Lawrence Payton, Abdul "Duke" Fakir, and the Andantes: Jackie Hicks, Marlene Barrow, and Louvain Demps.
- Instrumentation by the Funk Brothers and the Detroit Symphony Orchestra (strings).
  - Piano by Earl Van Dyke
  - Bass by James Jamerson
  - Guitar by Robert White
  - Drums by Benny Benjamin
  - String arrangements by Gil Askey
- Written by Brian Holland, Lamont Dozier, and Edward Holland Jr.
- Produced by Brian Holland and Lamont Dozier.

== Johnny Rivers version ==
"Baby I Need Your Lovin'"
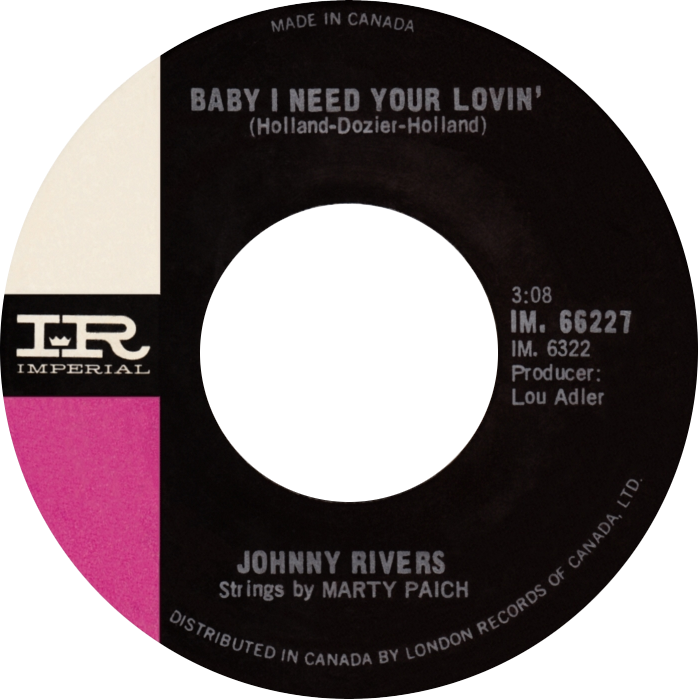
- Side A of the Canadian single

Single by Johnny Rivers

from the album Rewind
- B-side: "Gettin' Ready for Tomorrow"
- Released: January 1967
- Genre: R&B; soul
- Length: 3:08
- Label: Imperial
- Songwriter: Holland–Dozier–Holland
- Producer: Lou Adler

Johnny Rivers singles chronology
"Poor Side of Town" (1966)	"Baby I Need Your Lovin'" (1967)	"The Tracks of My Tears" (1967)

Johnny Rivers covered the song in 1967, titled as "Baby I Need Your Lovin'". This version reached No. 3 on the Billboard Hot 100, surpassing the original version's chart performance. In Canada, the song reached No. 1.

As with Rivers' precedent single, the No. 1 hit "Poor Side of Town", his "Baby I Need Your Loving" was performed in an orchestral pop style, being arranged by Marty Paich and featuring the LA Phil musicians who had performed on the Mamas and the Papas inaugural top ten hits. The second single from the track's parent album, Rewind was also an orchestral pop version of a Motown classic, being Rivers' version of "The Tracks of My Tears".

Personnel

- Lead vocals by Johnny Rivers.
- Background vocals by the Blossoms: Darlene Love, Fanita James, and Jean King.
- Instrumentation by the Wrecking Crew and the Los Angeles Philharmonic.
  - Piano by Larry Knechtel
  - Guitar by Mike Deasy
  - Bass by Joe Osborn
  - Drums by Hal Blaine
  - String arrangements by Marty Paich
- Produced by Lou Adler
- Written by Brian Holland, Lamont Dozier, and Edward Holland Jr.

== Other versions ==
- The Supremes recorded an uptempo version of the song for their studio album "The Supremes A'Go-Go" which would become the group's first No.1 Billboard 200 album in 1966.
- The Fourmost released their version of this song, reaching No. 24 in the UK in November 1964.
- O. C. Smith covered it and took it to No. 52 in 1970 (and No. 21 US AC).
- Eric Carmen took "Baby I Need Your Lovin'" to No. 62 in 1979 (Change of Heart, 1978). His cover also reached the Top 10 on the Canadian Adult Contemporary chart (#8), and No. 50 in the Top 100.
- Carl Carlton also covered the song in 1982 (The Bad C.C.), reaching No. 17 on the U.S. R&B charts, No. 12 in Australia in February 1983, and No. 27 in Canada.
- Lisa Stansfield on the soundtrack album of the 1999 film Swing, which was also sung in the film.
- Michael McDonald recorded "Baby I Need Your Loving" for his 2004 album Motown Two.
