= Changes (Johnny Rivers album) =

Studio album by Johnny Rivers
- Released: 1966
- Genre: Pop rock
- Length: 35:09
- Label: Imperial
- Producer: Lou Adler

Johnny Rivers chronology
...And I Know You Wanna Dance (1966)	Changes (1966)	Rewind (1967)

Professional ratings
Review scores
Source	Rating
AllMusic	4.5/5 stars

Changes is the third studio album by the American musician Johnny Rivers, released in 1966 by Imperial Records. The album includes "Poor Side of Town", which reached number one on the U.S. Billboard Hot 100 and the RPM Canadian Chart in November 1966.

== Reception ==
Changes marked a move away from the straight ahead rock-and-roll style on Rivers' previous albums. In his review in AllMusic, Bruce Eder highlighted the production of Lou Adler "whose reputation as a recording director par excellence rested on records like this" and called it "one of the best-sounding rock albums of 1967." The album was on the charts longer than any other Johnny Rivers LP.

== Track listing ==
=== Side one ===
1. "By the Time I Get to Phoenix" (Jimmy Webb) – 2:42
2. "A Taste of Honey" (Bobby Scott/Ric Marlow) – 3:22
3. "Days of Wine and Roses" (Henry Mancini/Johnny Mercer) – 4:05
4. "California Dreamin'" (John Phillips/Michelle Phillips) – 2:28
5. "Do You Want to Dance?" (Bobby Freeman) – 2:58
6. "Cast Your Fate to the Wind" (Vince Guaraldi/Carel Werber) – 3:19

=== Side two ===
1. "Poor Side of Town" (Johnny Rivers/Lou Adler) – 3:03
2. "If I Were a Carpenter" (Tim Hardin) – 2:34
3. "Softly as I Leave You" (Tony De Vita/Hal Shaper/Giorgio Calabrese) – 2:31
4. "The Shadow of Your Smile" (Paul Webster/Johnny Mandel) – 3:30
5. "Strangers in the Night" (Bert Kaempfert/Charles Singleton/Eddie Snyder) – 2:15
6. "Gettin' Ready for Tomorrow" (W. Hutchison) – 2:38

== Personnel ==
- Guitar: Tommy Tedesco, Johnny Rivers
- Bass: Joe Osborn
- Drums: Hal Blaine
- Percussion: Eddie Rubin
- Keyboards: Larry Knechtel
- Saxophone, Flute: Bud Shank
- Vibraphone: Gary Coleman
- Flugelhorn: Jules Chaikin

== Charts ==
Chart performance for Changes
Chart (1966)	Peak position
Canada Top Albums/CDs (RPM)	24
US Billboard Top LPs	33
