= Why I'm Walkin' =

Single by Stonewall Jackson

from the album The Dynamic Stonewall Jackson
- B-side: "Life of a Poor Boy"
- Released: February 22, 1960
- Recorded: 1959
- Genre: Country
- Length: 1:50
- Label: Columbia
- Songwriters: Melvin Endsley, Stonewall Jackson

Stonewall Jackson singles chronology
"Mary Don't You Weep" (1960)	"Why I'm Walkin'" (1960)	"Life of a Poor Boy" (1960)

"Why I'm Walkin'" is a song written by Melvin Endsley and Stonewall Jackson, performed by Stonewall Jackson and released on the Columbia label (catalog no. 4–41591). It debuted on the Billboard country and western chart in April 1960, peaked at the No. 6 spot, and remained on the chart for a total of 17 weeks.

The song became a country music standard and was recorded by numerous artists, including Ernest Tubb (1960), Wanda Jackson (1961), Skeeter Davis (1962), George Hamilton IV (1963), Loretta Lynn (1963), Carl Smith (1968), Johnny Paycheck, Ricky Skaggs (1988), Heather Myles] (1992), The Gordons (2005), and Buddy Miller (2011).
