= Realization (Johnny Rivers album) =

Studio album by Johnny Rivers
- Released: 1968
- Length: 38:45
- Label: Imperial
- Producers: Johnny Rivers; Lou Adler

Johnny Rivers chronology
Rewind (1967)	Realization (1968)	Slim Slo Slider (1970)

Professional ratings
Review scores
Source	Rating
AllMusic	4/5 stars

Realization is the fifth studio album by the American musician Johnny Rivers, released in 1968. Rivers wrote two of the songs and co-wrote a third. The remaining seven are covers of popular songs from the mid-1960s.

== Reception ==
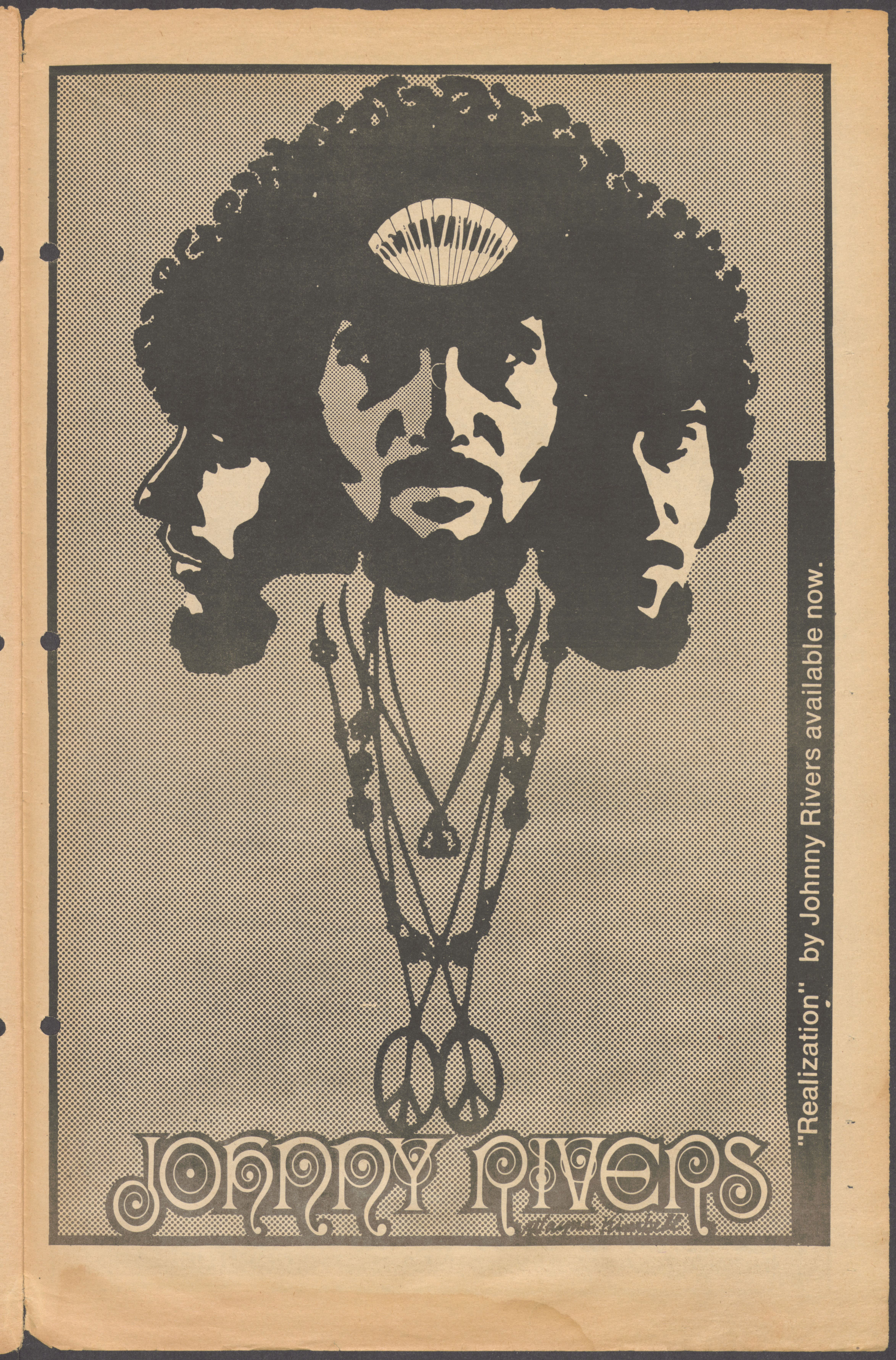
1968 trade ad for the album

The album reached No. 5 and included the No. 14 pop chart single "Summer Rain", written by James Hendricks, a former member of the Mugwumps. The album reflected some of the psychedelic influences of the time, like the song "Hey Joe" with a two-minute introduction and also marked a change in Rivers' musical direction with more introspective songs such as "Look to Your Soul" and "Going Back to Big Sur".

== Track listing ==
=== Side one ===
1. "Hey Joe" (Billy Roberts) – 4:49
2. "Look to Your Soul" (James Hendricks) – 3:11
3. "The Way We Live" (Johnny Rivers) – 3:08
4. "Summer Rain" (James Hendricks) – 3:52
5. "A Whiter Shade of Pale" (Keith Reid/Gary Brooker) – 5:36

=== Side two ===
1. "Brother, Where Are You" (Oscar Brown, Jr.) – 3:36
2. "Something Strange" (Johnny Rivers/James Hendricks) – 3:28
3. "What's the Difference" (Scott McKenzie) – 2:48
4. "Going Back to Big Sur" (Johnny Rivers) – 2:28
5. "Positively 4th Street" (Bob Dylan) – 5:03

== Personnel ==
=== Musicians ===
- Johnny Rivers – vocals, electric guitar
- Hal Blaine – drums
- Joe Osborn – electric bass guitar, guitar
- Larry Knechtel – organ
- James Burton – guitar
- James Hendricks – rhythm guitar

=== Technical ===
- Johnny Rivers, Lou Adler – producers
- Armin Steiner – engineer
- Marty Paich – horns and strings arranger/conductor
- Woody Woodward – art direction
- George Rodriguez – photography
- Wayne Kimbell – design and collage

== Charts ==
Chart performance for Realization
Chart (1968)	Peak position
Canada Top Albums/CDs (RPM)	22
US Billboard Top LPs	5

== Certifications ==
Certifications for Realization
Region	Certification	Certified units/sales
United States (RIAA)	Gold	500,000^{^}
^{^} Shipments figures based on certification alone.
