= Hugh X. Lewis =

American country music songer-songwriter (1930–2020)

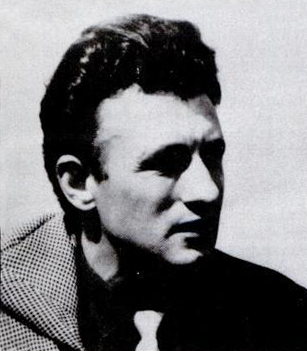
- Lewis in 1970

Background information
- Born: Hubert Bradley Lewis; December 25, 1930; Yeaddiss, Kentucky, U.S.
- Died: December 29, 2020 (aged 90) Nashville, Tennessee, U.S.
- Instruments: Vocals, guitar, bass, piano
- Years active: 1964–2014
- Labels: Kapp; Columbia; GRT; Little Darlin'

Hubert Bradley "Hugh X." Lewis (December 25, 1930 – December 29, 2020) was an American country music singer-songwriter who recorded for various labels since 1964, and charted fifteen singles on the Hot Country Songs charts. Lewis's debut single, "What I Need Most", peaked at number 21 on this chart. Lewis also wrote eleven songs for Stonewall Jackson including the number one single "B.J. the D.J."

== Biography ==
Hubert Brad Lewis was born in Yeaddiss, Kentucky. He worked at a steel mill in Kentucky and moved to Nashville, Tennessee, in 1963 and first had success as a songwriter, writing "B.J. the D.J." for Stonewall Jackson; Mac Wiseman and George Morgan also covered Lewis's songs.

In 1964, Lewis released his first single for Kapp Records, "What I Need Most". The song peaked at number 21 on the U.S. country singles charts. Lewis released ten more singles for Kapp, including the top 40 hits "Out Where the Ocean Meets the Sky", "I'd Better Call the Law on Me", "You're So Cold (I'm Turning Blue)" and "Evolution and the Bible". He also had a Top 20 hit in Canada with "All Heaven Broke Loose".

Lewis opened a club in Printer's Alley in 1972, where he hosted a television show also titled Hugh X. Lewis Country Club It was sponsored by Heil Quaker Corporation and appeared in 91 major markets.

Lewis died from complications of COVID-19 in Nashville, Tennessee, on December 29, 2020, four days after his 90th birthday.

== Discography ==
=== Albums ===
| Year | Album details | Peak chart positions |
| Year | Album details | US Country |
|---|---|---|
| 1966 | Hugh X. Lewis | — |
| 1966 | Just Before Dawn | — |
| 1967 | My Kind of Country | 42 |
| 1968 | Country Fever | 39 |
| 1968 | Just a Prayer Away | — |
| 1980 | Goodwill Ambassador | — |

=== Singles ===
| Year | Single | Chart Positions | | Album |
| Year | Single | US Country | CAN Country | Album |
|---|---|---|---|---|
| 1964 | "What I Need Most" | 21 | — | Hugh X. Lewis |
| 1965 | "Out Where the Ocean Meets the Sky" | 32 | — | Hugh X. Lewis |
| 1965 | "I'd Better Call the Law on Me" | 30 | — | Hugh X. Lewis |
| 1966 | "I'm Losing You (I Can Tell)" | 45 | — | Just Before Dawn |
| 1966 | "Wish Me a Rainbow" | 61 | — | Just Before Dawn |
| 1967 | "You're So Cold (I'm Turning Blue)" | 38 | — | My Kind of Country |
| 1967 | "Wrong Side of the World" | 49 | — | My Kind of Country |
| 1968 | "Evolution and the Bible" | 36 | 28 | Just a Prayer Away |
| 1969 | "Tonight We're Calling It a Day" | 69 | — | Country Fever |
| 1969 | "All Heaven Broke Loose" | 72 | 16 | non-album songs |
| 1969 | "Restless Melissa" | 74 | — | non-album songs |
| 1970 | "Everything I Love" | 56 | — | non-album songs |
| 1970 | "Blues Sells a Lot of Booze" | 68 | — | non-album songs |
| 1978 | "Love Don't Hide from Me" | 93 | — | non-album songs |
| 1979 | "What Can I Do (To Make You Love Me)" | 92 | — | non-album songs |
