= In Action (Johnny Rivers album) =

In Action!

Studio album by Johnny Rivers
- Released: March 1965
- Recorded: 1964
- Studios: United Western Recorders, Los Angeles, California
- Genres: Pop, rock and roll
- Length: 31:50
- Label: Imperial
- Producer: Lou Adler

Johnny Rivers chronology
Here We à Go Go Again! (1964)	In Action! (1965)	Meanwhile Back at the Whisky à Go Go (1965)

Professional ratings
Review scores
Source	Rating
AllMusic	3

In Action! is the debut studio album by Johnny Rivers (and third overall). The album reached number 42 on the Billboard charts with "Mountain of Love" released as a single, reaching number nine on the Billboard Hot 100.

== Track listing ==
1. "Mountain of Love" (Harold Dorman) – 2:36
2. "Promised Land" (Chuck Berry) – 2:34
3. "I Should Have Known Better" (Lennon–McCartney) – 3:22
4. "I'm in Love Again" (Fats Domino, Dave Bartholomew) – 1:53
5. "Rhythm of the Rain" (John Claude Gummoe) – 2:17
6. "He Don't Love You Like I Love You" (Jerry Butler, Calvin Carter, Curtis Mayfield) – 3:04
7. "Cupid" (Sam Cooke) – 2:32
8. "Oh, Pretty Woman" (Roy Orbison, Bill Dees) – 2:49
9. "It's All Over Now" (Bobby Womack, Shirley Womack) – 2:40
10. "What Am I Doing Here With You" (P.F. Sloan, Steve Barri) – 2:28
11. "Moody River" (Gary Daniel Bruce) – 2:44
12. "Keep A-Knockin'" (Little Richard's rendition of the Perry Bradford song) – 2:18

== Personnel ==
=== Musicians ===
- Johnny Rivers – guitar
- Joe Osborn – bass
- Mickey Jones – drums

=== Technical ===
- Lou Adler – producer
- Bones Howe – engineer
- Studio Five – design
- David Chan – photography
- Steve McQueen – liner notes
