= I Washed My Hands in Muddy Water =

1965 single by Stonewall Jackson

Single by Stonewall Jackson

from the album Trouble and Me
- B-side: "I've Got to Change"
- Released: 1965
- Recorded: 1965
- Genre: Country
- Length: 2:42
- Label: Columbia
- Songwriter: Joe Babcock
- Producers: Don Law, Frank Jones

Stonewall Jackson singles chronology
| "Don't Be Angry" (1964) | "I Washed My Hands in Muddy Water" (1965) | "Trouble and Me" (1965) |

"I Washed My Hands in Muddy Water"

Single by Johnny Rivers

from the album Golden Hits
- B-side: "Roogalator"
- Released: May 1966
- Recorded: 1966
- Genre: Rock and roll
- Length: 2:58
- Label: Imperial
- Songwriter: Joe Babcock
- Producer: Lou Adler

Johnny Rivers singles chronology
| "Secret Agent Man" (1966) | "I Washed My Hands in Muddy Water" (1966) | "Poor Side of Town" (1966) |

"I Washed My Hands in Muddy Water" is a song written by Joe Babcock.

== Stonewall Jackson recording ==
In 1965, the song was recorded by Stonewall Jackson. His version reached number eight on Billboard's Hot Country Singles chart.

== Cover versions ==
- Lonnie Mack released an instrumental (electric guitar) version in 1965.
- Charlie Rich recorded and released it on his 1965 album The Many New Sides of Charlie Rich.
- The song was a hit by Johnny Rivers in 1966, reaching number 19 on the Billboard Hot 100 chart.
- In 1966, The Spencer Davis Group recorded the song for The Second Album.
- Siluete recorded a Serbo-Croatian version entitled "Moj srećan dom" ("My Happy Home") for the EP Dona (1967).
- Elvis Presley recorded and released it on the album Elvis Country (I'm 10,000 Years Old) in 1971.
- George Thorogood and the Destroyers recorded and released it on the album Ride 'Til I Die (2003)
- Charley Crockett recorded and released it on the album Music City USA (2021)
- The Grateful Dead covered it during their performance at Madison Square Garden on December 5, 1971.
