= At the Whisky à Go Go =

Live album by Johnny Rivers
- Released: February 1964
- Recorded: January 1964
- Venue: Whisky a Go Go, Los Angeles, California
- Genre: Blues rock
- Length: 34:48
- Label: Imperial
- Producer: Lou Adler

Johnny Rivers chronology
At the Whisky à Go Go (1964)	Here We à Go Go Again! (1964)

Professional ratings
Review scores
Source	Rating
AllMusic	3

Johnny Rivers at the Whisky à Go Go (shown as At Whisky-A-Go-Go on the original label) is a live album and the first album released by American rock and roll singer-songwriter and guitarist Johnny Rivers.

The album was released in February 1964, just as the Beatles and the British music invasion was getting into full swing. Rivers was asked to open the Whisky a Go Go nightclub in Los Angeles starting January 15, 1964 and during that run he recorded the album. With the help of producer Lou Adler, Johnny helped introduce the "Go Go sound" to rock and roll. The album reached number 13 on Billboard's Pop Albums chart, (number 12 on the Billboard 200) and became Johnny's first gold album. The album also gave Rivers his very first big hit, a cover version of Chuck Berry's 1959 hit "Memphis". Rivers's version went to number 2 on Billboard's Pop Singles chart in the summer of 1964, and stayed there for twelve weeks. It became his first gold single.

Johnny Rivers at the Whisky à Go Go would be the first of five albums that Rivers would record live at the nightclub, and is not to be confused with Johnny Rivers Live at the Whisky à Go Go, an entirely different album that was released in Germany.

== Track listing ==
1. "Memphis" (Chuck Berry) – 2:44
2. "It Wouldn't Happen with Me" (Raymond Evans) – 3:30
3. "Oh Lonesome Me" (Don Gibson) – 2:37
4. "Lawdy Miss Clawdy" (Lloyd Price) – 3:00
5. "Whiskey a Go Go" (Johnny Rivers) – 3:57
6. "Walking the Dog" (Rufus Thomas) – 3:51
7. "Brown Eyed Handsome Man" (Berry) – 2:36
8. "You Can Have Her (I Don't Want Her)" (Bill Cook) – 3:20
9. "Multiplication" (Bobby Darin) – 2:51
10. "Medley: La Bamba" (Traditional; arranged by Johnny Rivers) / "Twist and Shout" (Phil Medley, Bert Russell) – 6:22

== Personnel ==
- Guitar: Tay Uhler, Johnny Rivers
- Bass: Joe Osborn
- Drums: Eddie Rubin
- Piano: Joe Sample
