= Summer Rain (Johnny Rivers song) =

Single by Johnny Rivers

from the album Realization
- B-side: "Memory of the Coming Good"
- Released: November 1967
- Genre: Baroque pop; psychedelic pop; pop rock
- Length: 3:30
- Label: Imperial 66267
- Songwriter: Jim Hendricks

Johnny Rivers singles chronology
| "The Tracks of My Tears" (1967) | "Summer Rain" (1967) | "Look to Your Soul" (1968) |

"Summer Rain" is a song written by James Hendricks and performed by American musician Johnny Rivers on his 1968 LP Realization. It reached No. 14 on the US Billboard Hot 100, No. 6 on the US Cash Box Top 100, and No. 10 in Canada in early January, 1968. "Summer Rain" is about lifelong love during "the Summer of Love" of 1967. It was released in the late fall, as a reminiscence of the previous summer. The song references Sgt. Pepper's Lonely Hearts Club Band, the Beatles album which was released during May of that year.

== Charts ==
=== Weekly charts ===
| Chart (1967–68) | Peak position |
|---|---|
| Australia | 13 |
| Canada Top Singles (RPM) | 10 |
| New Zealand (Listener) | 10 |
| US Billboard Hot 100 | 14 |
| US Cash Box Top 100 | 6 |
| US Record World Singles | 11 |

=== Year-end charts ===
| Chart (1967) | Rank |
|---|---|
| Canada (RPM) | 98 |

| Chart (1968) | Rank |
|---|---|
| US Billboard Hot 100 | 118 |

== Personnel ==
- Lead vocals and acoustic guitar by Johnny Rivers
- Strings and horns by Marty Paich
- Drums by Hal Blaine
- Bass by Joe Osborn
- Uncredited: Electric Organ
