= Swayin' to the Music (Slow Dancing) =

"Swayin' to the Music (Slow Dancin')"

Single by Johnny Rivers

from the album Outside Help
- B-side: "Outside Help"
- Released: June 1977
- Genre: Soft rock
- Length: 4:02
- Label: Soul City (original local release); Big Tree (national release)
- Songwriter: Jack Tempchin

Johnny Rivers singles chronology
"Ashes and Sand" (1977)	"Swayin' to the Music (Slow Dancin')" (1977)	"Curious Mind (Um, Um, Um, Um, Um, Um)" (1978)

"Swayin' to the Music (Slow Dancin')", initially titled "Slow Dancing", is a song written by Jack Tempchin. Under the title "Slow Dancing", the song originally was a minor US hit in 1976 for the band Funky Kings (of which Tempchin was a member). The song became much better known as "Swayin' to the Music (Slow Dancin')" in a 1977 cover version by Johnny Rivers, which became a top ten US hit. It was Rivers' last top 40 hit in the United States, and became his second Gold record.

In 1979, Johnny Duncan covered the song under its original title "Slow Dancing", and had a top ten hit on the country charts with it in both the US and Canada.

== Content ==
The song describes a young man slow dancing in the middle of the night with his girlfriend. Nothing needs to be done at the moment; the man tells his girlfriend that he wouldn't want to be anywhere else or be with anyone else.

== First recordings ==
The first version of the song was made on the self-titled 1976 album by the Funky Kings whose membership included its composer Jack Tempchin: entitled "Slow Dancing", the track was issued as a single in October 1976, reaching No. 13 on the Easy Listening chart in Billboard crossing over to No. 61 on the Billboard Hot 100. Olivia Newton-John recorded "Slow Dancing" for her 1977 album release Making a Good Thing Better, with the lyrics changed from "my girl" to "my guy". A version of the song also appeared on the 1977 album release One More Tomorrow by the group Unicorn, fronted by Muff Winwood. The Unicorn version was issued as a single in 1977, with a 1978 re-release. "Slow Dancing" was also a single release for Lorna Wright in the summer of 1977.

== Johnny Rivers version ==
Rivers recording of the song was originally released under the title "Slow Dancing" in April 1977. It was initially issued on Rivers's own Soul City label; the single was the company's first release following the label's reactivation. After gaining airplay and response from customers, Rivers decided to lease the record to Big Tree (which was a subsidiary of Atlantic Records) for national distribution. The track was then issued on Big Tree in June 1977 under the title "Swayin' to the Music (Slow Dancin')" to avoid confusion with the current single release "Slow Dancing Don't Turn Me On" by the Addrisi Brothers.

Rivers's "Swayin' to the Music" had great chart success, reaching #10 on Billboard Hot 100, No. 8 on the US Adult Contemporary chart, No. 3 on Canada's chart, and No. 7 on Canada's Adult Contemporary chart.

== Chart performance ==
=== Weekly charts ===
Chart (1977)	Peak position
Australia (Kent Music Report)	36
Canada Top Singles (RPM)	3
Canada Adult Contemporary (RPM)	7
U.S. Billboard Hot 100	10
U.S. Billboard Adult Contemporary	8
U.S. Cashbox Top 100	6
U.S. Record World	11

=== Year-end charts ===
Chart (1977)	Rank
Canada	39
U.S. Billboard Hot 100	49
U.S. Billboard Adult Contemporary	42
U.S. Cash Box	9

== Certifications ==
Region	Certification	Certified units/sales
Canada (Music Canada)	Gold	75,000^{^}
United States (RIAA)	Gold	1,000,000^{^}
^{^} Shipments figures based on certification alone.

== Later versions ==
- In September 1977 Mike Walsh Show regular Mike Williams covered "Swayin' to the Music (Slow Dancin')" for the Australian market: Williams's single charted locally in Perth at No. 38 reaching a national chart peak of No. 80.
- Johnny Duncan remade the song as "Slow Dancing" for his 1979 album "See You When the Sun Goes Down". It was released as a single, the track afforded Duncan a No. 6 C&W hit.
- Lisa Hartman recorded "Slow Dancing" for her 1979 album, Hold On. However it was eventually left off the final release. When Hold On was released on CD in 2011, "Slow Dancing" was included as one of the bonus tracks.
- "Slow Dancing" was recorded by Ian Gomm for his 1980 album release What a Blow from which it was taken for single release
- Gloria Loring recorded it for her 2008 album release A Playlist.
- Ray Stevens recorded the song as "Swaying to the Music (Slow Dancing)" in 2021 for his digital album release, Slow Dance.
