= B.J. the D.J. =

Single by Stonewall Jackson

from the album I Love a Song
- A-side: "Big House on the Corner"
- Released: November 1963
- Recorded: 1963
- Genre: Country
- Length: 2:46
- Label: Columbia
- Songwriter: Hugh X. Lewis

Stonewall Jackson singles chronology
"Wild, Wild World" (1963)	"B.J. the D.J." (1963)	"Not My Kind of People" (1964)

"B.J. the D.J." is a song written by Hugh X. Lewis, and made famous by country music star Stonewall Jackson.

Released in November 1963, "B.J. the D.J." was Jackson's second and final No. 1 hit on the Billboard Hot Country Singles chart in February 1964; the song had a 22-week run in the chart's top 40.

== Story: The tale of B.J. ==
"B.J. the D.J." is a youth tragedy song (a genre popular at the time), the tale of a hard-living young disc jockey from "down near the Georgia Line" who is established as a friend of the singer. The song is respectfully influenced by the song writer's real-life friend, 'BJ the DJ' Johnson, who was a long time DJ and country music singer.

B.J. is well respected for his skills, rapport with the community, and playing music the fans wanted to hear. At the same time, in addition to his regular disk jockey job he also works multiple jobs at local record hops, often into the early morning hours. His constant working leaves him little time for sleep, a point his mother repeatedly admonishes him about along with driving an old, poorly maintained automobile. B.J. ignores these warnings and continues his lifestyle, often driving recklessly—and with limited sleep—to get to his radio station job on time.

The odds eventually catch up with B.J., just as his mother had feared. One rainy morning, B.J. loses control of his car when he misses a sharp curve, crashes into a ditch "at 90 miles per hour," and is killed. His fate at first remains unknown to his mother, although she immediately fears the worst when she hears the voice of a substitute disc jockey at sign-on. Those fears are confirmed when a policeman comes to her home to inform her that her son is dead.

== Chart performance ==
Chart (1963–1964)	Peak position
U.S. Billboard Hot Country Singles	1
