= Elmer Valentine =

American businessman (1923–2008)

- Born: Elmer Alfred Valentine; June 16, 1923; Chicago, Illinois, United States
- Died: December 3, 2008 (aged 85); Studio City, California, United States
- Occupation: Nightclub owner
- Known for: Whisky a Go Go
- Children: 1

Elmer Valentine (June 16, 1923 – December 3, 2008) was the co-founder of three famous nightclubs on the Sunset Strip in West Hollywood, California: the Whisky a Go Go, The Roxy Theatre and the Rainbow Bar & Grill.

== Biography ==
=== Early life ===
Valentine was born in Chicago on June 16, 1923, as Elmer Alfred Valentino. After serving as an Army Air Forces mechanic stationed in England during World War II, he returned to Chicago and joined the Chicago police force.

=== Career ===
Valentine moved to Los Angeles in 1960, where he became co-owner of P.J.'s, a successful West Hollywood restaurant-nightclub. He sold his interest in P.J.’s three years later and took a trip to Europe. While he was in Paris, he visited a discotheque called Le Whisky à Go-Go that was packed nightly with crowds of young dancers. Impressed by the club's success, Valentine returned to Los Angeles and opened his own Whisky a Go Go on January 15, 1964, with three partners: Phil Tanzini, Shelly Davis, and attorney Theodore Flier. In 1965, he launched The Trip, with beginning house bands The Leaves and The Grass Roots. It was a small rock club on the Sunset Strip. In 1972, along with Lou Adler, Mario Maglieri and others, he started the Rainbow Bar & Grill on the Sunset Strip. A year later, Valentine, Adler and original partners David Geffen, Elliot Roberts and Peter Asher opened the Roxy Theatre with a three night appearance by Neil Young and the Santa Monica Flyers as its premiere act.

Lou Adler bought into the Whisky in the late 1970s. Valentine sold his interest in the Whisky a Go Go in the 1990s, but retained an ownership in the Rainbow Bar & Grill and the Roxy Theatre until his death.

During the 1960s and 1970s the Whisky was one of the most important rock clubs in Los Angeles, hosting acts such as The Byrds, the Doors, the Kinks, the Who, and Buffalo Springfield., Oingo Boingo, The Go-Go's, Tom Petty, The Ramones, New York Dolls, and Blondie. In the 1980s and 1990s, the Whisky was known as a stepping stone for bands such as X, Guns N' Roses, Mötley Crüe, Van Halen, Ratt, and many other iconic bands. Both the Whisky a Go Go and The Roxy Theatre remain staples of the Sunset Boulevard club scene.
