= Charles Wayne Day =

American guitarist and baritone (1942–2008)

Chuck Day
- Birth name: Charles Wayne Day
- Also known as: Bing Day
- Born: August 5, 1942
- Origin: Chicago, Illinois, U.S.
- Died: March 10, 2008 (aged 65); Healdsburg, California, U.S.
- Genres: Soul-blues, rhythm and blues
- Instrument(s): Guitar, vocals, bass guitar, piano
- Years active: 1957–2007
- Formerly of: Johnny Rivers, The Mamas & the Papas, Shel Silverstein

Charles Wayne Day (August 5, 1942 – March 10, 2008), also known as Bing Day, was an American guitarist and baritone bluesman from the South Side of Chicago.

== Biography ==
His musical talents began to develop at age 3, and at age 15, he recorded the single "Pony Tail Partner" under the name "Bing Day" at Federal Records (1957). Day recorded several singles over the next ten years as 'Bing Day' and, also, 'Ford Hopkins'.

He moved to Los Angeles, California, in 1965 and began a career as one of the most listened to "unknown" artists in rock and roll. He became bassist with Johnny Rivers' Band. Day invented the signature lead guitar riff afterward used by Rivers in "Secret Agent Man".

Day worked with the Mamas and the Papas in 1967, again as bassist, also playing as second guitarist on "Monday, Monday" and "California Dreamin'".

During the 1970s and 1980s, Day played on numerous recordings including Shel Silverstein's Freaker's Ball. He also wrote for the soundtrack of Fritz the Cat and performed with musicians Luther Tucker and Merl Saunders.

Day formed his own band in 1986.

Day resided in Fairfax, California, from 1969, and continued to play locally in the San Rafael area of California until he was taken ill in January, 2007. After three months of care at Marin General Hospital, he was admitted to Santa Rosa Memorial Hospital before being relocated to District Hospital in Healdsburg, where he remained until his death on March 10, 2008, his grandson Noah's 6th birthday.

A memorial and parade were held in Fairfax for Day on March 22, 2008.

After his death, it was revealed that he was the biological father of Owen Vanessa Elliot, the daughter of singer Cass Elliot of the Mamas and The Papas.

== Discography ==
=== Solo releases ===
- "Pony Tail Partner" / "Since You Left Me" - Federal Records (1957) as Bing Day
- "Rain Silver Dollar" / "Dancing Puppets" - Fraternity Records (1958) as Bing Day With Danny Bell And The Bell Hops
- "Poor Stagger Lee" - Mercury Records (1958)
- "Mama's Place" / "I Can't Help It" - Mercury Records (1959) as Bing Day
- "Mary's Place" / "How Do I Do It" - Mercury Records (1959) as Bing Day
- "Ya Fine, Fine, Fine" - Apex Records (1959) as Ford Hopkins
- "How Do I Do It" - Mercury Records (1960)
- "She Was Not My Kind" - Apex Records (1961)
- "Memphis Tennessee" - Cameo/Parkway Records (1966)
- "We Gotta Get Outta this Place" - Fraternity Records (1967)

=== With Johnny Rivers (1965) ===
- "Here We GoGo Again"
- "Rivers Rocks the Folk"

=== With The Mamas & the Papas (1965-1966) ===
- "Monday, Monday" - Second Guitar
- "California Dreamin'" - Second Guitar

=== With The Young Gyants (1968) ===
- "Tom Dooley" / "We Gotta Get Out Of This Place" - Parkway
- "Memphis" / "It Hurts So Bad" - Cameo-Parkway (1964)

=== With Shel Silverstein (1971) ===
- Freakin' At The Freaker's Ball

=== The Chuck Day Band (1997) ===
- Desperate Measures

=== With Steven Wolf (2006) ===
- 20th Century Wolf, Volume I
  - Day co-wrote "You Don't Love Me Anymore" with Steven Wolf and Annie McIntyre; played lead guitar on the 2006 recording of the song.

== Soundtracks ==
=== Fritz the Cat ===
- "House Rock"
- "Winston"

=== Switchblade Sisters ===
- "Full Track"

=== Blacula ===
- "Black Girl"

=== One Flew Over the Cuckoo's Nest ===
- played the waterphone

== Television and video ==
- Sleazy Arms Hotel with Jim Gabbert (1998)
- Pacifica Public Access (1998)
- Zone Music Local Showcase (1998)
- Boney Maroni Promotional - Lifesigns Photo (2000)
- various Lifesigns Photo video (2000 to present)
- numerous commercial voice-overs including "Fall into the Gap" and "Member FDIC"

== Other projects ==
- Chuck Day and the Burning Sensations
- Fairfax Tavernacle Choir
- The Dori Green/Dave Bergman Show
- The 19 Broadway Swing Band
- The Chuck and Sam Duet
