= Memphis, Tennessee (song) =

1959 single by Chuck Berry

Single by Chuck Berry
- A-side: "Back in the U.S.A."
- Released: June 1959
- Recorded: September 26, 1958
- Genre: Rhythm and blues, rock and roll
- Length: 2:12
- Label: Chess 1729
- Songwriter: Chuck Berry

Chuck Berry singles chronology
"Almost Grown" (1959)	"Memphis, Tennessee" (1959)	"Broken Arrow" (1959)

"Memphis, Tennessee", sometimes shortened to "Memphis", is a song by Chuck Berry, first released in 1959. In the UK, the song charted at number 6 in 1963; at the same time Decca Records issued a cover version in the UK by Dave Berry and the Cruisers, which also became a UK Top 20 hit single. Johnny Rivers's version of the song was a number two US hit in 1964.

== Background ==
In the song the narrator is speaking to a long-distance operator, trying to find out the number of a girl named Marie, who lives in Memphis, Tennessee, "on the southside, high upon a ridge, just a half a mile from the Mississippi bridge". The narrator offers little information to the operator at first, only that he misses Marie and that they were separated by Marie's mother. The final verse reveals that Marie is, in fact, the narrator's six-year-old daughter; her mother, presumably the narrator's ex-wife, "tore apart our happy home" because she "did not agree", as it turned out, with their marriage, not his relationship with Marie, as the listener was misdirected to assume. This song was recorded in St. Louis at Chuck Berry's home, in July 1958.

The song was released on Chess Records in June 1959, Catalogue #1729.

Chuck Berry later composed a sequel, "Little Marie", which appeared in 1964 as a single and on the album St. Louis to Liverpool.

== Personnel ==
- Chuck Berry – vocals, guitar, guitar overdubs, electric bass
- Jasper Thomas – drums

== Weekly charts ==
Chart (1963)	Peak position
Ireland (IRMA)	3
UK	6

== Beatles versions ==
The Beatles recorded five versions of "Memphis, Tennessee", for BBC Radio. One version that was recorded on July 30, 1963, for the Pop Go the Beatles radio show was included on Live at the BBC in 1994. Another version that was recorded a few months later on October 5, 1963, for the Saturday Club radio show was included on On Air – Live at the BBC Volume 2 in 2013.

The group first performed it for their failed Decca audition on January 1, 1962, with Pete Best on drums.

John Lennon and his wife Yoko Ono would later perform the song with Berry on an episode of The Mike Douglas Show, aired on February 16, 1972. This performance notably featured wailing, avant-garde vocalizations from Ono, which visibly startled Berry; eventually, technicians disconnected Ono's microphone for the remainder of the set. This infamous rendition of the song would later become the subject of a skit by Bill Burr.

=== Personnel ===
- John Lennon – vocals, rhythm guitar
- Paul McCartney – bass guitar
- George Harrison – lead guitar
- Ringo Starr – drums

== Lonnie Mack version ==
"Memphis"

Single by Lonnie Mack

from the album The Wham of that Memphis Man!
- B-side: "Down in the Dumps"
- Released: September 1963
- Recorded: June 1963
- Genre: Instrumental rock, blues rock
- Length: 2:30
- Label: Fraternity
- Songwriter: Chuck Berry

Lonnie Mack singles chronology
"Memphis" (1963)	"Wham!" (1963)

In 1963, guitarist Lonnie Mack recorded a fast-paced instrumental version, which he called "Memphis". It went to number 5 on Billboard's Pop chart and number 4 on Billboard's R&B chart.

=== Weekly charts ===
Chart (1963)	Peak position
New Zealand (Listener)	5
US Billboard Hot 100	5
US Billboard R&B	4
US Cash Box Top 100	5

=== Year-end charts ===
Chart (1963)	Rank
US Billboard Hot 100	58
US Cash Box	71

== Johnny Rivers version ==
"Memphis"

Single by Johnny Rivers

from the album At the Whisky à Go Go
- B-side: "It Wouldn't Happen with Me"
- Released: May 1964
- Recorded: January 1964
- Venue: Whisky a Go Go, West Hollywood
- Genre: Rock and roll, rhythm and blues
- Length: 2:28
- Label: Imperial
- Songwriter: Chuck Berry

Johnny Rivers singles chronology
"Dream Doll" (1964)	"Memphis" (1964)	"Oh What a Kiss" (1964)

In 1964 singer Johnny Rivers recorded another version of the tune (which he, following Mack, called "Memphis"), copying Mack's pacing and some of his instrumental improvisations, and reinstating the vocal line from Berry's original. This version hit number 2 on Billboard's Pop chart.

=== Weekly charts ===
Chart (1964)	Peak position
Australia	47
Canada RPM Top Singles	1
Germany	1
New Zealand (Listener)	6
US Billboard Hot 100	2
US Cash Box Top 100	2

=== Year-end charts ===
Chart (1964)	Rank
UK	74
US Billboard Hot 100	41
US Cash Box	57

== Fred Knoblock version ==
"Memphis"

Single by Fred Knoblock
- B-side: "Love Isn't Easy"
- Released: 1981
- Recorded: 1981
- Genre: Country music
- Length: 2:35
- Label: Scotti Brothers ZS5 02434
- Songwriter: Chuck Berry
- Producer: James Stroud

Fred Knoblock singles chronology
"Killin' Time" (1980)	"Memphis" (1981)	"I Had It All" (1982)

In 1981, country singer-songwriter Fred Knoblock recorded his rendition of "Memphis". It went to number 10 on Billboard's Country chart and number 28 on Billboard's Adult Contemporary chart.

Chart (1981)	Peak position
Canada RPM Country	12
US Billboard Hot 100	102
US Billboard Adult Contemporary	28
US Billboard Country	10

== Other versions ==
The British rock group Faces recorded a version of "Memphis, Tennessee" for their 1971 album A Nod Is as Good as a Wink... to a Blind Horse. Featuring Rod Stewart on vocals and their characteristic boogie rock style, the Faces' interpretation brought a jam-oriented approach to Berry's classic. The album reached number 2 in the UK and number 6 in the US.

The song has been covered over 200 times by musical artists. Another notable example is Bernd Spier who hit number 1 in 1964 in Germany.

=== Weekly charts ===
Dave Berry & the Cruisers

Chart (1963)	Peak position
Ireland (IRMA)	9
UK	19
