= Waterloo (Stonewall Jackson song) =

Single by Stonewall Jackson

from the album The Dynamic Stonewall Jackson
- B-side: "Smoke Along the Track"
- Released: 1959
- Genre: Country
- Length: 2:27
- Label: Columbia
- Songwriter(s): John D. Loudermilk; Marijohn Wilkin
- Producer(s): Don Law

Stonewall Jackson singles chronology
"Life to Go" (1958)	"Waterloo" (1959)	"Smoke Along the Track" (1959)

"Waterloo" was a number-one hit (country chart) for country singer Stonewall Jackson in 1959. It was written by John D. Loudermilk and Marijohn Wilkin.

== Background ==
The song tells of three famous people who, because of their actions, "met their Waterloo" – Adam (who ate the "apple"), Napoleon (at the namesake battle), and Tom Dooley (who was hanged for murder).

== Chart performance ==
The single was the most successful of Jackson's career, spending five weeks at #1 on the Billboard Hot Country & Western chart. The B-side of "Waterloo", "Smoke Along the Track", reached #24 on the country chart. "Waterloo" was also Jackson's only top 40 pop hit, peaking at #4 on the Billboard Hot 100 chart and at #3 on the Cash Box Top 100 chart.
