= Stonewall Jackson (singer) =

American country music singer (1932–2021)

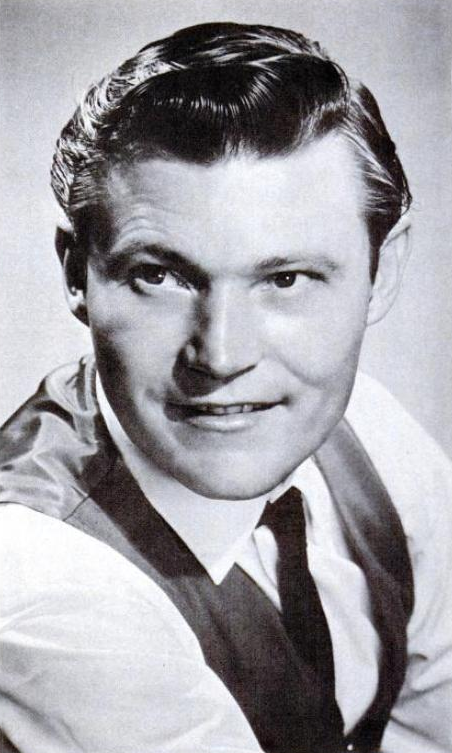
- Jackson in 1966

Background information
- Born: November 6, 1932; Tabor City, North Carolina, U.S.
- Died: December 4, 2021 (aged 89) Nashville, Tennessee, U.S.
- Genres: Country; honky-tonk
- Occupations: Singer; musician
- Instruments: Vocals; acoustic guitar
- Years active: 1956–2012
- Label: Columbia
- Formerly of: Ray Price; Hank Williams; Lefty Frizzell; Ernest Tubb

Stonewall Jackson (November 6, 1932 – December 4, 2021) was an American country music singer and musician who achieved his greatest fame during country's "golden" honky tonk era in the 1950s and early 1960s.

== Biography ==
=== Early years ===
Born in Tabor City, North Carolina on November 6, 1932, Jackson was the youngest of three children. Stonewall is not a nickname; he was named after Confederate General Thomas "Stonewall" Jackson. His father believed himself to be a descendant of the general, a claim that was reproduced in some of Jackson's publicity, but that is unlikely.

When Stonewall was two, his father died after which his mother moved the family to Moultrie in South Georgia, where he grew up first working under his abusive sharecropper stepfather, and then under his uncle, who was also a sharecropper. Jackson lied about his age and enlisted in the Army at 16, but was soon discharged when his lie was discovered. He subsequently joined the Navy in 1950 and was discharged in 1954. He moved to Nashville, Tennessee in 1956. Jackson later wrote a memoir From the Bottom Up: The Stonewall Jackson Story as Told in His Own Words about his childhood.

=== Recording career ===
After hearing Jackson's demo tape, Wesley Rose, president of Acuff-Rose Music, arranged for Jackson to audition for the Grand Ole Opry. Jackson became the first artist to join the Grand Ole Opry before obtaining a recording contract. He toured with Ernest Tubb, who became his mentor. Jackson signed with Columbia Records in 1957.

His breakthrough came in the country Top 40 in late 1958, with a song written by a young George Jones, "Life to Go". It peaked at No. 2 in early 1959 and his follow-up record, "Waterloo", was No. 1 for five weeks, and crossed over into the Top 40 of the Billboard Hot 100 chart, where it reached No. 4. The track also reached No. 24 in the UK Singles Chart in July 1959. It sold over one million copies, and was awarded a gold disc. The song was a haunting and catchy tune that states "Everybody has to meet his Waterloo", meaning their fate. The song cites Adam, Napoleon and Tom Dooley as examples.

His next No. 1 hits came in 1964 with "Don't Be Angry" and "B.J. the D.J." (Jackson's foray into the teenage tragedy song trope, about an over-worked country music radio station disc jockey, who crashes his car in a rainstorm). In 1971, Jackson was the first artist to record a live album from the Grand Ole Opry with Recorded Live At The Grand Ole Opry. His other hit songs include "The Carpet on the Floor", "Why I'm Walkin'", "A Wound Time Can't Erase", and "I Washed My Hands In Muddy Water". Jackson also recorded a cover version of Lobo's 1971 hit, "Me and You and a Dog Named Boo", which became Jackson's final top 10 hit.

From 1958 to 1971, Jackson had 35 Top 40 country hits.

=== Later years ===
In 2006, Jackson sued the Grand Ole Opry for $10 million in compensatory damages and $10 million in punitive damages, claiming age discrimination. As a member of the Opry for over 50 years, Jackson believed management was sidelining him in favor of younger artists. In his court filing, Jackson claimed that Opry general manager Pete Fisher stated that he did not "want any gray hairs on that stage or in the audience, and before I'm done there won't be any." Fisher is also alleged to have told Jackson that he was "too old and too country". The lawsuit was settled on October 3, 2008 for an undisclosed amount and Jackson returned to performing on the show. He was a member of the Opry from 1956 until his death. He largely retired from performing by 2012, with his last public performance being at the funeral of his longtime friend George Jones.

Jackson lived on a farm in Brentwood, Tennessee, where his wife Juanita died on January 11, 2019. She was also his personal manager and operated his song publishing company, Turp Tunes. He has a son, Stonewall Jackson Jr.

He was inducted into the North Carolina Music Hall of Fame on October 11, 2012.

Jackson died in Nashville, Tennessee, on December 4, 2021, at the age of 89, from complications of vascular dementia.

== Discography ==
=== Albums ===
Year	Album	US Country	Label
1959	The Dynamic Stonewall Jackson		Columbia
1962	The Sadness in a Song		Columbia
1963	I Love a Song	2	Columbia
1965	Trouble & Me	15	Columbia
1965	The Exciting Stonewall Jackson		Columbia
1965	Stonewall Jackson's Greatest Hits	20	Columbia
1966	All's Fair in Love 'n' War	5	Columbia
1967	Help Stamp Out Loneliness	36	Columbia
1967	Country		Columbia
1968	Nothing Takes the Place of Loving You	34	Columbia
1968	The Great Old Songs	38	Columbia
1969	Old Country Church		Columbia
1969	Greatest Hits 2		Columbia
1969	Tribute to Hank Williams		Columbia
1970	The Lonesome in Me		Columbia
1970	The Real Thing		Columbia
1971	Recorded Live at the Grand Ole Opry		Columbia
1971	Me and You and a Dog Named Boo		Columbia
1972	The World		
1976	Greatest Hits		GRT
1979	Platinum Country		Little Darlin'
1979	Bad Ass		Little Darlin'
1981	Stars of the Grand Ole Opry		1st Generation
1983	Audiograph Live		Audiograph

=== Singles ===
Year	Single	Chart Positions				Album
Year	Single	US Country	US Cash Box Country	US	CAN Country	Album
1958	"Life to Go"	2	1			The Dynamic Stonewall Jackson
1959	"Waterloo"	1	1	4		The Dynamic Stonewall Jackson
1959	"Smoke Along the Track"	24	30			The Dynamic Stonewall Jackson
1959	"Igmoo (The Pride of South Central High)"	29	16	95		single only
1960	"Mary Don't You Weep"	12	8	41		The Dynamic Stonewall Jackson
1960	"Why I'm Walkin'"	6	8	83		The Dynamic Stonewall Jackson
1960	"Life of a Poor Boy"	15	22			singles only
1960	"A Little Guy Called Joe"	13	11			singles only
1961	"Greener Pastures"	26	14			The Sadness in a Song
1961	"Hungry for Love"	27	13			The Sadness in a Song
1962	"A Wound Time Can't Erase"	3	1			I Love a Song
1962	"Second Choice"	18	38			The Sadness in a Song
1962	"One Look at Heaven"	11	14			The Sadness in a Song
1962	"Leona"	9	33			The Sadness in a Song
1963	"Can't Hang Up the Phone"	11	8			single only
1963	"Old Showboat"	8	11			Trouble & Me
1963	"Wild Wild Wind"	15	11			I Love a Song
1964	"B.J. the D.J."	1	2			I Love a Song
1964	"Not My Kind of People"	24	27			Trouble & Me
1964	"Don't Be Angry"	4	4		3	I Love a Song
1965	"I Washed My Hands in Muddy Water"	8	4			Trouble & Me
1965	"Trouble and Me"	30	35			Trouble & Me
1965	"Lost in the Shuffle"	22				Stonewall Jackson's Greatest Hits
1965	"Poor Red Georgia Dirt"	44				singles only
1965	"If This House Could Talk"	24	18			singles only
1966	"The Minute Men (Are Turning in Their Graves)"	24	19			All's Fair in Love 'N' War
1966	"Blues Plus Booze (Means I Lose)"	12	21			All's Fair in Love 'N' War
1967	"Help Stamp Out Loneliness"	5	5			Help Stamp Out Loneliness
1967	"Promises and Hearts (Were Made to Break)"	15	13			Help Stamp Out Loneliness
1967	"This World Holds Nothing (Since You're Gone)"	27	27			Country
1968	"Nothing Takes the Place of Loving You"	39	20			Nothing Takes the Place of Loving You
1968	"I Believe in Love"	31	35			Nothing Takes the Place of Loving You
1968	"Angry Words"	16	15		13	Greatest Hits 2
1969	"Somebody's Always Leaving"	52	47			The Lonesome in Me
1969	"'Never More' Quote the Raven"	25	18		13	The Lonesome in Me
1969	"Ship in the Bottle"	19	34			The Lonesome in Me
1970	"Better Days for Mama"	72				The Lonesome in Me
1970	"Born That Way"	72				The Real Thing
1970	"Oh Lonesome Me"	63	52			The Real Thing
1971	"Me and You and a Dog Named Boo"	7	5		3	Me and You and a Dog Named Boo
1971	"Push the Panic Button"					Me and You and a Dog Named Boo
1972	"That's All This World Needs" (w/ Brentwood Children's Choir)	51	50			The World
1972	"Torn from the Pages of Life"	71	52			singles only
1973	"I'm Not Strong Enough (To Build Another Dream)"	70				singles only
1973	"True Love Is the Thing"					singles only
1973	"Herman Schwartz"	41	50		89	singles only
1973	"Ol' Blue"					singles only
1974	"Don't Be Late"					Greatest Hits
1978	"Spirit of Saint Louis"					Bad Ass
1978	"Walk Out on Me (Before I Walk All Over You)"					single only
1978	"My Favorite Sin"					Bad Ass
1979	"Point of No Return"					singles only
1979	"Listening to Johnny Paycheck"					singles only
1981	"Full Moon Empty Pockets"					Stars of the Grand Ole Opry
1983	"Let the Sun Shine on the People"					Audiograph Live
