= Lou Adler =

American record producer (born 1933)

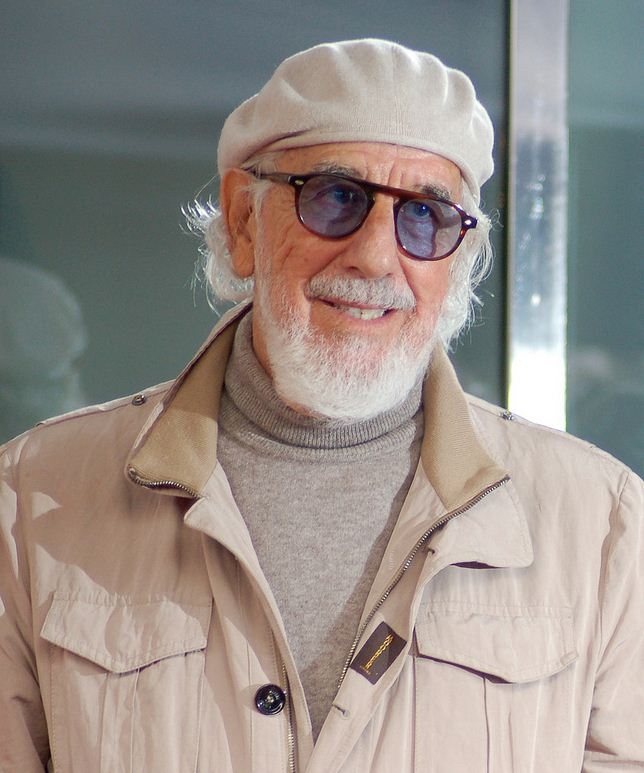
- Adler at the ceremony for Carole King receiving a star on the Hollywood Walk of Fame, December 2012
- Born: Lester Louis Adler; December 13, 1933 (age 92); Chicago, Illinois, U.S.
- Occupations: Record producer, film producer
- Spouses: Shelley Fabares (m. 1964; div. 1980); Page Hannah (m. 1992)
- Partner: Britt Ekland (1972–1974)
- Children: 8, including Cisco Adler

Lester Louis Adler (born December 13, 1933) is an American record and film producer and the co-owner of the Roxy Theatre in West Hollywood, California. He has produced and developed a number of high-profile musical artists including The Grass Roots, Jan and Dean, The Mamas & the Papas, and Carole King. King's album Tapestry, produced by Adler, won the 1972 Grammy Award for Album of the Year and has been called one of the greatest pop albums of all time.

Adler is an executive producer of The Rocky Horror Picture Show and discovered and produced comedy albums and films for Cheech & Chong. In 2006, he was awarded a star on the Hollywood Walk of Fame for his achievements in music. He was inducted into the Rock & Roll Hall of Fame in 2013 as the recipient, alongside Quincy Jones, of the Ahmet Ertegun Award.

== Early life ==
Adler was born to a Jewish family, the son of Manny and Josephine (Alpert) Adler, in Chicago, in 1933, and grew up in the Boyle Heights section of Los Angeles.

== Career ==
=== Music ===
Adler's career in music began as co-manager, alongside Herb Alpert, of Jan and Dean. Adler and Alpert transitioned from managing into songwriting, composing the songs "River Rock" in 1958 for Bob "Froggy" Landers, and the Cough Drops and "Wonderful World" with Sam Cooke.

In 1964, Adler founded Dunhill Records. He was president and the chief record producer of the label from 1964 to 1967. During that time, Adler signed The Mamas & the Papas to Dunhill, producing six top-five hits for the group including "California Dreamin'" and "Monday, Monday". Dunhill also reached No. 1 on the pop chart with Barry McGuire's single "Eve of Destruction". Through additional efforts by co-producers and songwriting duo P.F. Sloan and Steve Barri, the label reached No. 8 on the pop chart with the Grass Roots single "Let's Live for Today".

Capitalizing on Dunhill's success, Adler sold the label to ABC in 1967 and founded Ode Records, to which he signed Carole King, Spirit, Cheech & Chong, Scott McKenzie, Peggy Lipton, and others. Adler produced all of King's albums on Ode, which includes four gold, a platinum, and a diamond album, as certified by the RIAA. King's second album for Ode, Tapestry, sold more than 25 million copies worldwide and is considered one of the greatest albums of all time. Adler's work on Tapestry garnered him two Grammy Awards in 1972: Record of the Year (for producing "It's Too Late") and Album of the Year.

In addition to working with his label's artists, Adler produced a number of live albums for Johnny Rivers. In June 1967, Adler helped to produce the Monterey International Pop Festival, as well as the film version, Monterey Pop, which he co-produced with John Phillips from The Mamas & the Papas.

=== Film ===
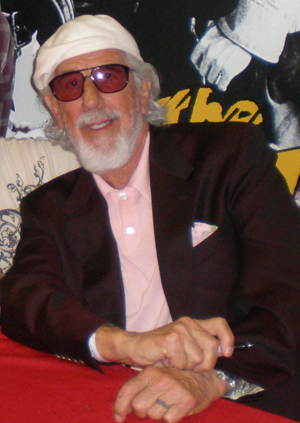
Adler at the Rock and Roll Hall of Fame in July 2007

After Monterey Pop, Adler and Phillips teamed up again to produce the 1970 Robert Altman film Brewster McCloud. In 1975, Adler served as executive producer of the cult classic The Rocky Horror Picture Show. After seeing The Rocky Horror Show at a theater in London, Adler bought the American rights to the show, presented it live in Los Angeles, and executive-produced the film version (adding "Picture" to the title). The movie became the longest-running theatrical film in history.

In 1978, Adler directed the movie Up in Smoke, starring Cheech & Chong. The movie remains a cult hit, and in 2000 Adler and Cheech Marin recorded a commentary track for the DVD release. His 1981 film, Ladies and Gentlemen, The Fabulous Stains, did not make a large impact upon release but has enjoyed a long life on cable TV broadcasts. Also in 1981, Adler executive produced the follow-up to The Rocky Horror Picture Show, Shock Treatment.

== Personal life ==
Adler married actress and singer Shelley Fabares in 1964 and produced several of her songs. They separated in 1966 and formally divorced in 1980. She passed away in 2026.In 1973, he fathered his first son, Nic Adler, with actress Britt Ekland. In 1978, he fathered another son, Cisco Adler, with then-girlfriend Phyllis Somer. In the 1980s, his son Sonny was born from a brief relationship with Danish model Winnie Hollman. In 2024, it was revealed that Hollman's daughter Honey, who is two years older than Sonny, is also Adler's biological child. Before that, Honey was assumed to have been the daughter of Jack Nicholson, who Hollman was also seeing at the time.

Adler is married to former actress Page Hannah. They have four children. He has often sat courtside next to Dyan Cannon and Jack Nicholson at Los Angeles Lakers home games. He owns the Roxy Theatre with his son Nic, who operates the historic music venue on the Sunset Strip in West Hollywood, California. Peter Fonda based his character Terry Valentine in The Limey on Adler.

On September 1, 1976, Adler and his administrative assistant were kidnapped from their Malibu home. One of the perpetrators pulled a gun on Adler's assistant and gained entry. The two men were held for eight hours and released after $25,000 in ransom money was paid. Three suspects were arrested and sheriff's deputies later recovered $14,900 of the ransom. Two suspects were convicted and one was sentenced to life in prison.

== Production discography ==
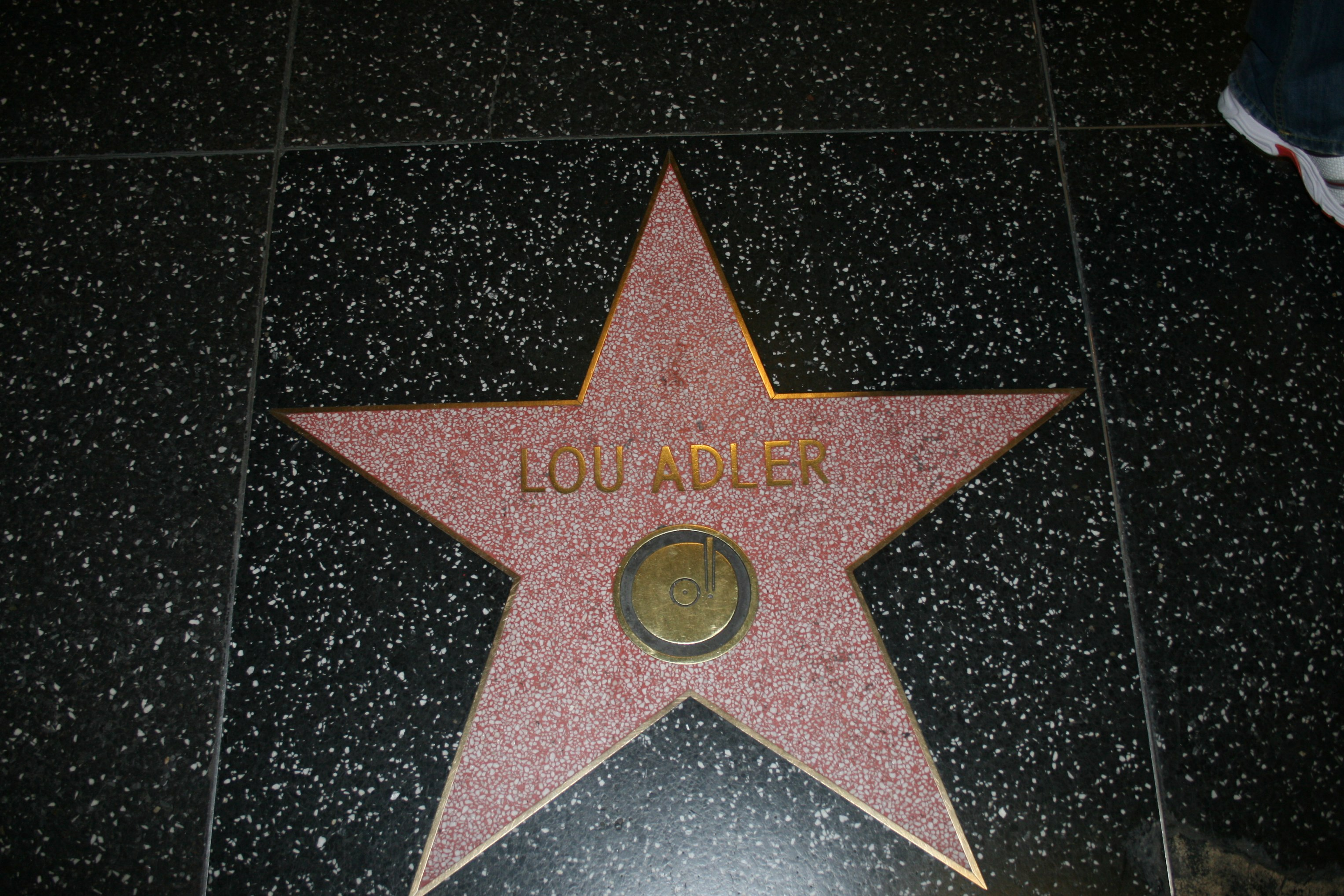
Adler's star on the Hollywood Walk of Fame

Here is a list of albums produced by Lou Adler:

No.
- 18 Essential Songs – Janis Joplin

A

- All the Leaves Are Brown – The Mamas & the Papas
- ...And I Know You Wanna Dance – Johnny Rivers
- At the Whisky à Go Go – Johnny Rivers

B

- Before and After – Neil Young (produced with Neil Young)

C

- The Carnegie Hall Concert: June 18, 1971 – Carole King
- Changes – Johnny Rivers
- Cheech and Chong – Cheech & Chong
- Cheech & Chong's Wedding Album – Cheech & Chong
- Clear – Spirit

D

- Deliver – The Mamas & the Papas
- Dream a Little Dream – Cass Elliot
- Dylan's Gospel – The Brothers and Sisters of LA

E

- Eve of Destruction – Barry McGuire (produced with Sloan & Barri)

F

- The Family That Plays Together – Spirit
- Fantasy – Carole King

G

- Greatest Hits – The Mamas & the Papas

H

- Her Greatest Hits: Songs of Long Ago – Carole King
- Here We à Go Go Again! – Johnny Rivers
- Historic Performances Recorded at the Monterey International Pop Festival – The Jimi Hendrix Experience / Otis Redding

I

- If You Can Believe Your Eyes and Ears – The Mamas & the Papas
- In Action – Johnny Rivers

J

- John Phillips (John, the Wolf King of L.A.) – John Phillips

L

- Los Cochinos – Cheech & Chong

M

- The Mamas & the Papas – The Mamas & the Papas
- Meanwhile Back at the Whisky à Go Go – Johnny Rivers
- Model Shop – Spirit
- Music – Carole King

O

- Only 16 – Terry Black

P

- The Papas & The Mamas – The Mamas & the Papas
- Peggy Lipton – Peggy Lipton

R

- Really Rosie – Carole King
- Rewind – Johnny Rivers
- Rhymes & Reasons – Carole King

S

- Second Song – Neil Young
- Speeding Time – Carole King
- Spirit – Spirit

T

- Tapestry – Carole King
- The Rocky Horror Show: Original Roxy Cast – Roxy Cast (Los Angeles, USA)
- Thoroughbred – Carole King
- Time Circle, 1968–1972 – Spirit

V

- The Voice Of Scott McKenzie – Scott McKenzie (produced with John Phillips)

W

- Wrap Around Joy – Carole King

== Filmography ==
The following is a list of films produced or directed by Lou Adler:

- Monterey Pop (1968) – producer
- Brewster McCloud (1970) – producer
- The Rocky Horror Picture Show (1975) – executive producer
- Up in Smoke (1978) – director, producer
- Shock Treatment (1981) – executive producer
- Ladies and Gentlemen, The Fabulous Stains (1982) – director
- Murphy's Romance (1985) – music producer
- American Me (1992) – executive producer
- Cheech & Chong's Animated Movie (2013) – producer
- The Rocky Horror Picture Show: Let's Do the Time Warp Again (2016) – executive producer
