= The Mamas & the Papas discography =

Cataloging of published recordings by The Mamas & the Papas

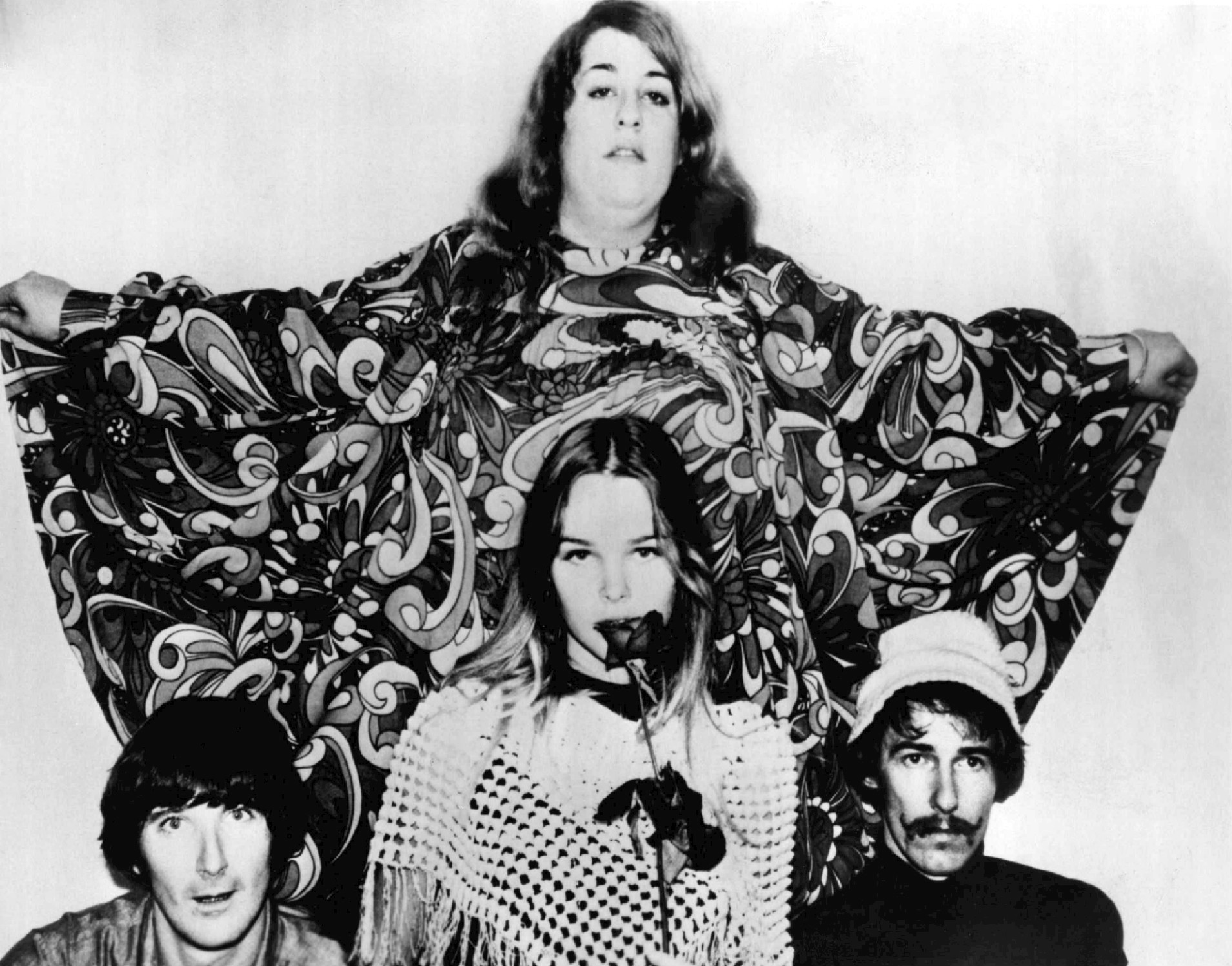
- The Mamas & the Papas in 1967
- Studio albums: 5
- EPs: 5
- Live albums: 5
- Compilation albums: 23
- Singles: 17
- Video albums: 6
- Music videos: 6

The Mamas & the Papas were a vocal group from Los Angeles, California, that was active from 1966 to 1969. Their discography consists of a total of five albums and 17 singles, six of which made the Billboard top ten, and sold close to 40 million records worldwide. "Monday, Monday" hit number one on the Billboard Hot 100 chart in March 1966 and "California Dreamin'" was the top song on the Billboard Year-End Hot 100 singles of 1966.

The Mamas & the Papas' recordings were released on Dunhill Records until 1967, when the company was sold and the label became ABC-Dunhill. Around 1973, ABC-Dunhill discarded all multi-track session recordings and mono masters because they were deemed obsolete and too expensive to store. The original recordings of the Mamas & the Papas, and of labelmates such as Three Dog Night, are therefore lost, and it has been necessary to create digital versions from the stereo album masters, often second- or third-generation tapes. This is why the sound quality of Mamas and Papas' reissues does not match the best from the 1960s. In 2012, Sundazed Records located a mono master of If You Can Believe Your Eyes and Ears in the UK and released it on 180-gram vinyl and a limited edition of 500 compact discs. Three years later an extensive search of label archives worldwide turned up all the mono singles and mono LP masters from which the 50th Anniversary 2-CD set was made a year later and reissued for Record Store Day in 2018.

The RIAA has certified the single "California Dreamin'" as 4× platinum, and the singles "Dream a Little Dream of Me", and "Monday, Monday" as platinum.

== Albums ==
=== Studio albums ===
List of studio albums, with selected details, peak chart positions and certifications
Title	Album details	Peak chart positions				Certifications
Title	Album details	US	CAN	GER	UK	Certifications
If You Can Believe Your Eyes and Ears	Released: February 1966; Label: Dunhill (D 50006 / DS 50006)	1	—	—	3	RIAA: Platinum
The Mamas & the Papas	Released: August 1966; Label: Dunhill (D 50010 / DS 50010)	4	10	14	24	RIAA: Gold
Deliver	Released: February 1967; Label: Dunhill (D 50014 / DS 50014)	2	3	30	4	RIAA: Gold
The Papas & the Mamas	Released: May 1968; Label: Dunhill (DS 50031)	15	—	—	—	
People Like Us	Released: November 1971; Label: Dunhill (DSX 50106)	84	55	—	—	
"—" denotes a recording that did not chart or was not released in that territory.

=== Live albums ===
List of live albums, with selected details
Title	Album details
Historic Performances at the Monterey International Pop Festival	Released: 1970; Label: Dunhill (DSX 50100)
Greatest Hits: Live in 1982	Released: 1989; Label: Success (2170CD)
Live in Concert	Released: 1991; Label: PolyTel Elite (848 697-2)
California Dreamin'	Released: 1997; Label: Prism Leisure (PLATCD 274)
Live!	Released: 1999; Label: Pegasus (PEG CD 269)

=== Select compilation albums ===
List of select compilation albums, with selected details, peak chart positions and certifications
Title	Album details	Peak chart positions					Certifications
Title	Album details	US	AUS	BEL (FL)	NL	UK	Certifications
Farewell to the First Golden Era	Released: 1967; Label: Dunhill (D 50025 / DS 50025)	5	—	—	—	—	RIAA: Gold
Golden Era Vol. 2	Released: 1968; Label: Dunhill (DS 50038)	53	—	—	—	—	
Hits of Gold	Released: 1969; Label: Stateside (5007)	—	—	—	—	7	
16 of Their Greatest Hits	Released: 1969; Label: Dunhill (DS 50064)	61	13	—	—	—	
A Gathering of Flowers	Released: 1970; Label: Dunhill (DSY 50073)	—	—	—	—	—	
20 Golden Hits	Released: 1973; Label: Dunhill (DSX 50145)	186	—	—	—	—	
The Best of the Mamas and the Papas	Released: 1977; Label: Arcade (ADEP 30)	—	—	—	—	6	BPI: 2× Platinum
The ABC Collection	Released: 1979; Label: ABC Records (AC-30005)	—	—	—	—	—	
The Hit Singles Collection	Released: 1986; Label: MCA (LMCL 521)	—	—	—	—	—	
The ★ Collection	Released: 1991; Label: MCA (MCD 17756)	—	—	—	—	—	
Creeque Alley: The History of the Mamas and the Papas	Released: 1991; Label: MCA (MCAD2-10195)	—	—	—	—	—	BPI: Gold
California Dreamin': The Very Best of the Mamas and the Papas	Released: 1995; Label: Polygram (5239732)	—	—	45	33	14	
California Dreamin': The Greatest Hits of the Mamas and the Papas	Released: 1997; Label: Telstar (TTVCD 2931)	—	—	—	—	30	
Greatest Hits	Released: 1998; Label: MCA (MCAD-11740)	—	—	—	—	—	
Before They Were the Mamas & the Papas... The Magic Circle	Released: 1999; Label: Varèse Sarabande (VSD-5996)	—	—	—	—	—	
20th Century Masters – The Millennium Collection: The Best of the Mamas & the Papas	Released: 1999; Label: Geffen, MCA	—	—	—	—	—	RIAA: Gold
All the Leaves Are Brown: The Golden Era Collection	Released: 2001; Label: MCA (088 112 653-2)	—	—	—	—	—	
Complete Anthology (4-disc box set)	Released: 2004; Label: MCA (982 168 0)	—	—	—	—	—	
Gold	Released: 2005; Label: Geffen (B0002616-02)	—	—	—	—	—	
California Dreamin': The Best of the Mamas and the Papas	Released: 2006; Label: UMTV (9841715)	—	—	—	—	21	BPI: Gold
Icon	Released: 2011; Label: Geffen (B0015530-02)	—	—	—	—	—	
The Complete Singles (50th Anniversary Collection)	Released: 2016; Label: Real Gone Music (RGM-0418)	—	—	—	—	—	
Ultimate Anthology	Released: 2016; Label: UMe/Universal Music Special Markets (B0024954-02)	—	—	—	—	—	
"—" denotes a recording that did not chart or was not released in that territory.

=== Video albums ===
List of video albums, with selected details
Title	Album details
Straight Shooter	Released: 1989; Label: Rhino Home Video (RNVD 1931)
The Very Best of the Mamas and the Papas	Released: 2001; Label: MVD (MVD 08582)
California Dreamin': The Songs of the Mamas and the Papas	Released: 2005; Label: Hip-O (B0004218-09)
The Mamas & the Papas & Other '60s Greats	Released: 2005; Label: Eagle Vision/SOFA Home Entertainment (EREDV514)
Legends of the Canyon	Released: 2009; Label: Image Entertainment (ID4847ISDVD)
The Ed Sullivan Show Presents: The Mamas & the Papas	Released: 2016; Label: SOFA (DVD-MPES)
The Ed Sullivan Show Presents: California Dreaming' - The Songs of the Mamas & the Papas	Released: 2016; Label: SOFA/TJL/Treasury Collection (DVD-MP01)

== Singles ==
List of singles, with selected peak chart positions and certifications
Title	Year	Peak chart positions										Certifications	Album
Title	Year	US	AUS	BEL (FL)	BEL (WA)	CAN	GER	NL	NZ	SA	UK	Certifications	Album
"Go Where You Wanna Go"	1965	—	—	—	—	—	—	—	—	—	—		If You Can Believe Your Eyes and Ears
"California Dreamin'"	1965	4	87	—	—	3	31	—	14	—	9	RIAA: 4× Platinum; BPI: 3× Platinum; BVMI: Platinum; RMNZ: 3× Platinum	If You Can Believe Your Eyes and Ears
"Monday, Monday"	1966	1	4	2	7	1	2	2	4	1	3	RIAA: Platinum; BPI: Silver	If You Can Believe Your Eyes and Ears
"I Saw Her Again"	1966	5	9	—	47	1	21	6	6	3	11		The Mamas & the Papas
"Look Through My Window"	1966	24	67	—	—	5	—	—	18	—	53 (Note: Chart position is from the official UK "Breakers List".)		Deliver
"Words of Love"	1966	5	6	—	—	3	—	—	—	—	47		The Mamas & the Papas
"Dancing in the Street"	1966	73	6	—	—	—	—	—	—	—	—		The Mamas & the Papas
"Dedicated to the One I Love"	1967	2	3	13	8	3	26	15	10	2	2	RIAA: Gold	Deliver
"Creeque Alley"	1967	5	4	—	26	1	—	—	16	19	9		Deliver
"Twelve Thirty"	1967	20	20	—	—	14	—	—	11	16	51		The Papas & the Mamas
"Glad to Be Unhappy"	1967	26	55	—	—	6	—	—	—	—	—		Golden Era Vol. 2
"Dancing Bear"	1967	51	—	—	—	13	—	—	—	—	—		The Mamas & the Papas
"Safe in My Garden"	1968	53	86	—	—	30	—	—	—	—	—		The Papas & the Mamas
"Dream a Little Dream of Me"	1968	12	1	—	—	7	5	—	—	8	11 (Note: "Dream a Little Dream of Me" is credited only to Mama Cass on the UK Singles Chart.)	RIAA: Platinum; BPI: Gold; RMNZ: Platinum	The Papas & the Mamas
"For the Love of Ivy"	1968	81	—	—	—	55	—	—	—	—	—		The Papas & the Mamas
"Do You Wanna Dance"	1968	76	—	—	—	37	—	—	—	—	—		If You Can Believe Your Eyes and Ears
"Step Out"	1972	81	—	—	—	—	—	—	—	—	—		People Like Us
"—" denotes a recording that did not chart or was not released in that territory.

== See also ==
- The Mugwumps discography
- Denny Doherty discography
- Cass Elliot discography
- John Phillips discography
- Michelle Phillips discography
