= 16 of Their Greatest Hits =

Greatest hits album by the Mamas & the Papas
- Released: August 1969
- Genre: Folk rock, pop
- Length: 49:01
- Label: Dunhill
- Producer: Lou Adler

The Mamas & the Papas chronology
The Papas & the Mamas (1968)	16 of Their Greatest Hits (1969)	People Like Us (1971)

16 of Their Greatest Hits is a compilation album by the Canadian-American folk rock band the Mamas & the Papas.

== Reception ==
Professional ratings
Review scores
Source	Rating
The Encyclopedia of Popular Music	4/5 stars
The Great Rock Discography	8/10
MusicHound Rock: The Essential Album Guide	4/5 stars
The Rolling Stone Record Guide	3/5 stars

AllMusic stated in its review of the album that it is a "great overview of the music from this group" and that "This is a good collection of their unforgettable electric folk-pop songs" Billboard stated that it is a "collector's dream come true" and that it "is an enjoyable trip down memory lane."

== Track listing ==
1. Dedicated to the One I Love – 2:59
2. Monday, Monday – 3:24
3. Look Through My Window – 3:34
4. California Dreamin' – 2:40
5. I Call Your Name – 2:37
6. My Girl – 3:49
7. Dream a Little Dream of Me – 3:13
8. Go Where You Wanna Go – 2:27
9. Got a Feelin' – 2:51
10. I Saw Her Again Last Night – 3:14
11. Words of Love – 2:15
12. Twelve-Thirty (Young Girls Are Coming to the Canyon) – 3:24
13. Dancing in the Street – 3:48
14. Glad to Be Unhappy – 1:43
15. Creeque Alley – 3:49
16. Midnight Voyage – 3:14

== Charts ==
Chart (1969)	Peak position
Australian Charts (ARIA)	13
US Top LPs (Billboard)	61

== Release history ==
Country	Date	Label	Format	Catalogue number
Worldwide issue	August 1969	Dunhill	LP, CD	DS 50064
Worldwide reissue	1971	MCA	LP, CD	Unknown
