= 20th Century Masters – The Millennium Collection: The Best of the Mamas & the Papas =

Compilation album by The Mamas & the Papas
- Released: March 23, 1999
- Genre: Pop rock
- Length: 34:50
- Label: Geffen/MCA

The Mamas & the Papas chronology
People Like Us (1971)	20th Century Masters – The Millennium Collection: The Best of the Mamas & the Papas (1999)	All the Leaves Are Brown: The Golden Era Collection (2001)

20th Century Masters – The Millennium Collection: The Best of the Mamas & the Papas is a compilation album by the folk-rock vocal group The Mamas & the Papas. The album was only released on CD and cassette by Geffen and MCA Records.

== Critical reception ==
Professional ratings
Review scores
Source	Rating
AllMusic	3/5 stars
The Rolling Stone Album Guide	3/5 stars
Tom Hull	B

Stephen Thomas Erlewine of AllMusic says The Mamas & the Papas 20th Century Masters — The Millennium Collection is "an irresistible 11-song summary of their MCA recordings." While it may be missing "a couple of noteworthy songs", he suggests "this is an excellent introduction for neophytes and a great sampler for casual fans."

== Track listing ==
No.	Title	Writer(s)	Length
1.	"California Dreamin'"		2:41
2.	"Monday, Monday"		3:27
3.	"Creeque Alley"		3:49
4.	"Dedicated to the One I Love"		2:59
5.	"Twelve Thirty (Young Girls Are Coming to the Canyon)"		3:26
6.	"Words of Love"		2:16
7.	"Look Through My Window"		3:08
8.	"I Saw Her Again Last Night"		3:13
9.	"Dancing Bear"		4:11
10.	"Make Your Own Kind of Music"	Barry Mann; Cynthia Weil	2:26
11.	"Dream a Little Dream of Me"		3:14
Total length:			34:50

== Charts ==
Chart (2007)	Peak position
Scottish Albums (OCC)	50

Chart (2016)	Peak position
US Top Catalog Albums (Billboard)	36

== Certifications and sales ==
Region	Certification	Certified units/sales
United States (RIAA)	Gold	500,000^{^}
^{^} Shipments figures based on certification alone.
