= All the Leaves Are Brown =

All the Leaves are Brown: The Golden Era Collection

Compilation album by The Mamas & the Papas
- Released: August 28, 2001
- Recorded: 1965–68
- Genres: Pop rock, folk rock, psychedelic pop, sunshine pop
- Length: 154:13
- Label: MCA
- Producers: Lou Adler (original); Andy McKaie (reissue)

The Mamas & the Papas chronology
20th Century Masters – The Millennium Collection: The Best of the Mamas & the Papas (1999)	All the Leaves are Brown: The Golden Era Collection (2001)

Professional ratings
Review scores
Source	Rating
Allmusic	4.5/5 stars

All the Leaves are Brown: The Golden Era Collection is a 2001 release compiling the first four albums by The Mamas & the Papas in their entirety, with some single-exclusive mono versions and one non-album track. The package includes a brief history of the group and its albums by Matthew Greenwald, author of Creeque Alley: The Oral History of The Mamas & The Papas.

== Track listing ==
All songs by John Phillips unless otherwise noted.

=== Disc One ===
If You Can Believe Your Eyes and Ears (Feb 1966)

1. "Monday, Monday"
2. "Straight Shooter"
3. "Got a Feelin'" (John Phillips, Denny Doherty)
4. "I Call Your Name" (John Lennon, Paul McCartney)
5. "Do You Wanna Dance?" (Bobby Freeman)
6. "Go Where You Wanna Go"
7. "California Dreamin'" (J. Phillips, Michelle Phillips)
8. "Spanish Harlem" (Jerry Leiber, Phil Spector)
9. "Somebody Groovy"
10. "Hey Girl" (J. Phillips, M. Phillips)
11. "You Baby" (Steve Barri, P. F. Sloan)
12. "The 'In' Crowd" (Billy Page)

The Mamas & the Papas (Sept 1966)

13. "No Salt on Her Tail"
14. "Trip Stumble and Fall"
15. "Dancing Bear"
16. "Words of Love"
17. "My Heart Stood Still" (Richard Rodgers, Lorenz Hart)
18. "Dancing in the Street" (Marvin Gaye, William "Mickey" Stevenson, Ivy Jo Hunter)
19. "I Saw Her Again" (J. Phillips, Doherty)
20. "Strange Young Girls"
21. "I Can't Wait"
22. "Even if I Could"
23. "That Kind of Girl"
24. "Once Was a Time I Thought"

The Mamas & The Papas Deliver (March 1967)

25. "Dedicated to the One I Love" (Ralph Bass, Lowman Pauling)
26. "My Girl" (Smokey Robinson, Ronald White)
27. "Creeque Alley" (J. Phillips, M. Phillips)

=== Disc Two ===
The Mamas & The Papas Deliver (continued)

1. "Sing for Your Supper" (Rodgers, Hart)
2. "Twist and Shout" (Phil Medley, Bert Russell)
3. "Free Advice" (J. Phillips, M. Phillips)
4. "Look Through My Window"
5. "Boys & Girls Together"
6. "String Man" (J. Phillips, M. Phillips)
7. "Frustration"
8. "Did You Ever Want to Cry"
9. "John's Music Box"

Non-LP single

10. "Glad to Be Unhappy" (Rodgers, Hart)
  - Released Oct 1967

The Papas & The Mamas (May 1968)

11. "The Right Somebody to Love" (Jack Yellen, Lew Pollack)
12. "Safe in My Garden"
13. "Meditation Mama (Transcendental Woman Travels)" (J. Phillips, Lou Adler)
14. "For the Love of Ivy" (J. Phillips, Doherty)
15. "Dream a Little Dream of Me" (Fabian Andre, Wilbur Schwandt, Gus Kahn)
16. "Mansions"
17. "Gemini Childe"
18. "Nothing's Too Good For My Little Girl" (Ned Wynn)
19. "Too Late"
20. "Twelve Thirty (Young Girls Are Coming to the Canyon)"
21. "Rooms"
22. "Midnight Voyage"

Single versions (mono)

23. "I Saw Her Again" (J. Phillips, Doherty)
  - Released June, 1966
24. "Words of Love"
  - Released Nov 1966
25. "Creeque Alley" (J. Phillips, M. Phillips)
  - Released Apr 1967
  - Note: Although labeled as the mono single version, this is actually the mono LP version.
