= Farewell to the First Golden Era =

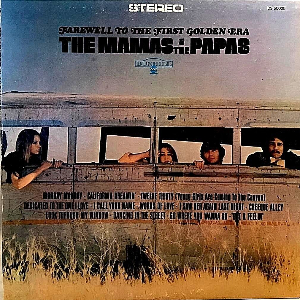

Greatest hits album by the Mamas & the Papas
- Released: 1967
- Genres: Folk rock; folk pop; pop
- Label: Dunhill

The Mamas & the Papas chronology
Deliver (1967)	Farewell to the First Golden Era (1967)	The Papas & the Mamas (1968)

Farewell to the First Golden Era is the first compilation album released by the American folk vocal group the Mamas & the Papas. it was released in 1967 by Dunhill Records.

== Content ==
The album includes liner notes written by Derek Taylor.

== Reception ==
Professional ratings
Review scores
Source	Rating
AllMusic	4.5/5 stars
The Encyclopedia of Popular Music	2/5 stars
The Great Rock Discography	7/10 stars
MusicHound Rock	4/5 stars
The Rolling Stone Album Guide	3/5 stars

AllMusic's William Ruhlmann called it "great for what it was, but ominous for what it foreshadowed, with both of those characteristics apparent in the album title." and that "But this wasn't just the first golden era, it was the only one, and with a lone Top 40 hit (a cover of Rodgers & Hart's "Glad to Be Unhappy") left and one half-hearted album (The Papas & the Mamas, April 1968) to come before the group's breakup, this really was farewell." Cashbox called it a "powerpacked album that is primed for busy chart action." and that "This one should be a hit of blockbuster proportions." Cash Box also missfered the band as "The Mamas and Poppas" Record World states: "All the golden singles are here. 'Monday, Monday,' 'California Dreamin',' 'Dedicated to the One I Love,' 'I Saw Her Again Last Night,' "Look Through My Window.' The essence of the musical art of the Mamas and the Papas."

== Track listing ==
Side one

1. Dedicated to the One I Love – 2:56
2. Go Where You Wanna Go – 2:32
3. Words of Love – 2:13
4. Look Through My Window – 3:05
5. Dancing in the Street – 3:00
6. Monday, Monday – 3:03

Side two

1. Creeque Alley – 3:45
2. Got a Feelin' – 2:44
3. Twelve Thirty (Young Girls Are Coming to the Canyon) – 3:20
4. I Call Your Name – 2:32
5. I Saw Her Again – 2:50
6. California Dreamin' – 2:32

== Charts ==
Weekly chart performance
Chart (1967–1968)	Peak position
US Billboard Top LP's	5
US Cash Box Top 100 Albums	5
US Record World 100 Top LPs	3

Year-end chart performance
Chart (1968)	Ranking
US Billboard	17
US Cash Box	56

== Certifications ==
Certifications for Farewell to the First Golden Era
Region	Certification	Certified units/sales
United States (RIAA)	Gold	500,000^{^}
^{^} Shipments figures based on certification alone.

== Sequel ==
In 1968 a follow-up to the album was released, titled Golden Era, Vol. 2.
