= The Mamas & the Papas (album) =

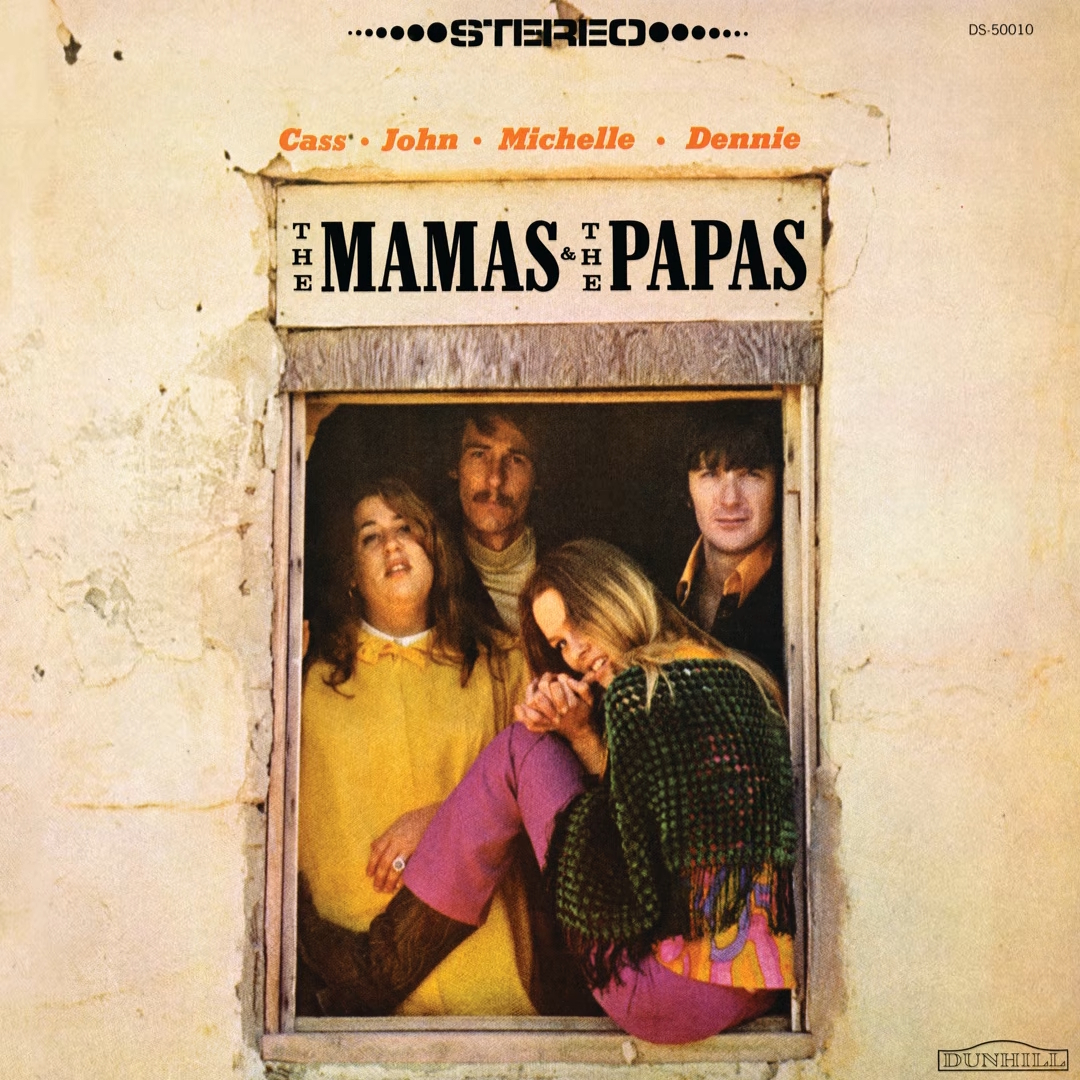

Studio album by the Mamas & the Papas
- Released: August 30, 1966
- Genre: Sunshine pop
- Length: 31:07
- Label: Dunhill
- Producer: Lou Adler

The Mamas & the Papas chronology
If You Can Believe Your Eyes and Ears (1966)	The Mamas & the Papas (1966)	The Mamas & The Papas Deliver (1967)

Singles from The Mamas & the Papas
- 1. "I Saw Her Again" Released: July 1966; 2. "Words of Love" Released: November 14, 1966; 3. "Dancing in the Street" Released: 1966; 4. "Dancing Bear" Released: 1967

The Mamas & the Papas is the second studio album by the American-Canadian folk rock vocal group the Mamas & the Papas, released on August 30, 1966. The album peaked at number 4 on the US Billboard 200 album chart and number 24 in the UK. The lead off single, "I Saw Her Again", reached number 5 on the US Billboard Hot 100 chart and number 11 in the UK Singles Chart. "Words of Love" was released as the second single in the US peaking at number 5. In the UK, it was released as a double A-side with "Dancing in the Street" (a cover of the 1964 hit by Martha and the Vandellas) and charted at number 47 in the UK.

After John Phillips discovered that group member Michelle Phillips was having an affair with Gene Clark of the Byrds, he fired her from the group on June 4, 1966. In June, a new singer was hired to replace her. Jill Gibson was producer Lou Adler's girlfriend at the time and was already a singer/songwriter who had performed on several Jan and Dean albums.

The photo already chosen for the album's cover featured Michelle Phillips prominently, so Dunhill had Gibson take a photo posed in exactly the same position as Michelle, and then superimposed the new photo over that of Phillips. However, the decision was then made to shoot an entirely new picture with the new line-up and to also change the album's title to Crashon Screamon All Fall Down, which it was promoted under before release. With the return of Michelle to the group just prior to the LP's release, the original cover and eponymous title were reinstated.

The album was first issued on CD in 1988 (MCAD-31043) and also appears in its entirety on All the Leaves Are Brown, a retrospective compilation of the band's first four albums, with the single versions of "I Saw Her Again" and "Words of Love".

Professional ratings
Review scores
Source	Rating
AllMusic	link

== Original track listing ==
All songs by John Phillips, unless otherwise noted.

=== Side one ===
1. "No Salt on Her Tail" – 2:35
2. "Trip, Stumble and Fall" (John Phillips, Michelle Gilliam) – 2:35
3. "Dancing Bear" – 4:08
4. "Words of Love" – 2:13
5. "My Heart Stood Still" (Richard Rodgers, Lorenz Hart) – 1:43
6. "Dancing in the Street" (Marvin Gaye, William "Mickey" Stevenson, Ivy Jo Hunter) – 3:00

=== Side two ===
1. "I Saw Her Again" (John Phillips, Denny Doherty) – 2:50
2. "Strange Young Girls" – 2:45
3. "I Can't Wait" – 2:40
4. "Even If I Could" – 2:40
5. "That Kind of Girl" – 2:20
6. "Once Was a Time I Thought" – 0:58

== Personnel ==
- Denny Doherty – vocals
- Cass Elliot – vocals
- John Phillips – vocals, guitar
- Michelle Phillips – vocals
- Jill Gibson – vocals
- Hal Blaine – drums, percussion
- Larry Knechtel – organ, piano
- Joe Osborn – bass guitar
- "Doctor" Eric Hord – guitar
- Tommy Tedesco – guitar
- P. F. Sloan – guitar
- Peter Pilafian – electric violin
- Ray Manzarek – organ, piano on "No Salt on Her Tail"

Technical

- Lou Adler – producer
- Dayton "Bones" Howe – engineer
- Henry Lewy – engineer
- Bowen David – assistant engineer
- Jimmie Haskell – string arrangement on "I Saw Her Again"
- Gene Page – horn arrangement on "My Heart Stood Still"
- Guy Webster – photography
- George Whiteman – artwork

== Chart positions ==
=== Weekly charts ===
Chart (1966–67)	Peak position
Canada RPM Top 25 LPs	8
UK Record Retailer LPs Chart	24
US Billboard Top LP's	4
US Cash Box Top 100 Albums	5
US Record World 100 Top LP's	2
West German Musikmarkt LP Hit Parade	14

Chart (2024)	Peak position
Greek Albums (IFPI Greece)	72

=== Year-end charts ===
Chart (1966)	Peak position
US Cash Box Top 100 Albums	88

Chart (1967)	Peak position
US Billboard Top LP's	28
US Cash Box Top 100 Albums	43

== Certifications ==
Certifications for The Mamas & The Papas
Region	Certification	Certified units/sales
United States (RIAA)	Gold	500,000^{^}
^{^} Shipments figures based on certification alone.

== Sources ==
- Goldsmith, Melissa Ursula Dawn (November 22, 2019). Listen to Classic Rock!: Exploring a Musical Genre. New York City: Bloomsbury Publishing USA. ISBN 978-1-4408-6579-4 – via Google Books.
