= James Anthony (musician) =

- Born: James Anthony Pecchia; 8 August 1955 (age 71); Toronto, Ontario, Canada
- Genres: Blues, jazz
- Occupations: Guitarist, singer-songwriter
- Instrument: Guitar
- Website: jamesanthony.ca

James Anthony (born James Anthony Pecchia, 8 August 1955) is a Canadian guitarist, singer, songwriter and record producer.

== Early life ==
James Anthony Pecchia was born in Western Hospital, Toronto, Ontario. His parents were Corinna Madott and Aurelio Pecchia. He grew up in Etobicoke (Renforth Dr) and went to school at Sir Adam Beck, Eatonville, Bloordale, Silverthorne and Burnhamthorpe Collegiate. He started playing the guitar at age nine.

Anthony then moved to Cambridge in 1989 and then Burlington in 2004. He plays locally and in the summer at festivals all over North America.

== Career ==
He went on the road at 17 in 1972 with The Cougars TCB, one of the first reggae bands in Canada led by Jay Douglas.

In 1971, at the age of 16, Anthony joined Jay Douglas and the Cougars TCB and then in 1974 Edward Bear, Ebony Jam and various Toronto bands. In 1978, he had one album released by RCA with Mondo Combo. In the 1980s, Anthony played country sessions, TV and radio shows. As part of the Lulu's House Band in the 1990s in Kitchener, Ontario, Anthony performed with over 150 touring artists, including Sam Moore of Sam & Dave, Denny Doherty of The Mamas & the Papas, Gary U.S. Bonds, and The Platters. He co-wrote "Here I Am" for the Denny Doherty documentary and for many films and jingles.

He hosted an award-winning roots musical variety show "The Midnight Hour" on Rogers cable in the 1990s, and "James Anthony Live" on Cogeco Cable in 2011–2013.

He was inducted into Blues Hall of Fame USA on 22 September 2013 in Detroit.

Anthony now resides in Burlington, Ontario, and owns and operates Sound Investments Recording Studio. He is still active in the blues, jazz and roots music community as a session musician, record producer, and arranger. Anthony writes for and produces other artists, jingles and film scores and performs at blues festivals. He has also self-released a number of albums of his music.

== Discography ==
- Nite School
- Play Something You Know
- Soul Shoes
- The Blue Side of...
- Room for Me
- All Spruced Up
- On The Edge
- Live in the Barrel
- Some People Get It
- Jazz at 7"
- James Anthony in Full Colour
- "Profile " 2023
