= People Like Us (The Mamas & the Papas album) =

Studio album by the Mamas and the Papas
- Released: November 1971
- Studio: Sound Factory (Hollywood)
- Genres: Folk rock, soft rock
- Length: 36:12
- Label: Dunhill
- Producer: John Phillips

The Mamas and the Papas chronology
16 of Their Greatest Hits (1969)	People Like Us (1971)	20th Century Masters – The Millennium Collection: The Best of the Mamas & the Papas (1999)

People Like Us (1971) is the fifth and final studio album released by the American folk rock vocal group the Mamas and the Papas.

The album was released in November 1971, three years after the group broke up but after it was discovered they still owed an album to Dunhill Records. The group had originally been signed to the label when it was run by their original producer Lou Adler. In 1971, ABC Records had purchased the label and discovered the band owed one more record to fulfill their contract. Without this record, the band were possibly subject to substantial financial penalties. Thus the group briefly reformed long enough to write and record People Like Us.

Due reportedly to the illness of Cass Elliot during the sessions, most lead vocals are handled by Denny Doherty and Michelle. Elliot's voice is audible on some tracks, but she does not feature as prominently as on the band's earlier albums. It was produced by John Phillips. Michelle Phillips later wrote in the liner note of a Mamas & Papas CD compilation that the album "sounded like what it was, four people trying to avoid a lawsuit".

Fans and critics were largely negative in their reception of the record, but the songs “Snowqueen of Texas” and “Lady Genevieve” were felt to be highlights. The single "Step Out" was a modest hit song (#81 Billboard Hot 100, #25 Adult Contemporary), and the track "Pearl" was a tribute to Janis Joplin.

Despite its reputation, the album sold moderately well and peaked at #84 on the Billboard Pop Albums Chart.

All tracks except "I Wanna Be a Star" (written by Michelle) were written by John, making People Like Us The Mamas and the Papas' only self-written and produced album. Some of the lyrics refer to John's romance at the time with actress Geneviève Waïte, whom he married in 1972. Waite is credited as co-writer of two of the album's songs.

People Like Us was reissued on MCA Records and Geffen Records.

The 2016 4-CD collection Ultimate Anthology features a full remix of the album, restoring various instrumental and vocal parts, including vocals by Cass Elliot that were originally mixed out by John Phillips.

Professional ratings
Review scores
Source	Rating
Allmusic	2/5 stars
Christgau's Record Guide	C−
Rolling Stone	(not rated)

== Track listing ==
All songs written by John Phillips, except where noted.

=== Side A ===
1. "People Like Us" – 3:25
2. "Pacific Coast Highway" – 3:04
3. "Snowqueen of Texas" (J. Phillips/Genevieve Waite) – 2:37
4. "Shooting Star" – 2:54
5. "Step Out" – 3:03
6. "Lady Genevieve" – 3:48

=== Side B ===
1. "No Dough" – 3:05
2. "European Blueboy" (J. Phillips/Waite) – 3:39
3. "Pearl" – 2:24
4. "I Wanna Be a Star" (Michelle Phillips) – 2:17
5. "Grasshopper" – 2:57
6. "Blueberries for Breakfast" – 2:59

=== Bonus tracks (Expanded CD version) ===
13. "Fantastic Four" [Outtake] 2:33
14. "Lady Genevieve" [Outtake] 4:30
15. "No Dough (Honeymoon)" [Alternative mix] 3:07
16. "Mississippi" [Album version] 3:36
17. "April Anne" 3:20
18. "Revolution on Vacation" [Alternative mix] 2:45
19. "Cup of Tea (Sky Jacked)" [Alternative mix] 3:50
20. "Me and My Uncle (Jack of Diamonds)" 4:20
21. "Andy's Talkin' Blues" 2:53

== Personnel ==
- Denny Doherty – vocals
- Cass Elliot – vocals
- John Phillips – vocals, guitar
- Michelle Phillips – vocals
- Gary Coleman – drums, tambourine, bells, vibraphone, shaker
- Ed Greene, Earl Palmer – drums
- Bobbye Hall – conga, tambourine, shaker, cabasa
- Jim Horn – flute, saxophone
- Clarence McDonald, Joe Sample – keyboards
- Tony Newton – bass guitar
- Donald Peake, Louie Shelton, David T. Walker – guitar

=== Technical ===
- Gene Page – orchestral arrangement
- Dave Hassinger – engineer
- Rick Heenan, Val Garay – assistant engineer
- Henry Diltz – cover photography

== Chart positions ==
Year	Chart	Position
1971	Billboard Top LPs	84
