= Guy Webster (photographer) =

American photographer (1939–2019)

- Born: Guy Michael Webster; September 14, 1939; Los Angeles, California, United States
- Died: February 5, 2019 (aged 79); Ojai, California, United States
- Spouse: Leone James Webster

Guy Michael Webster (September 14, 1939 – February 5, 2019)) was one of the early innovators of rock ‘n’ roll photography. His fifty-year career spanned the worlds not only of music but film and politics. While shooting album covers and magazine layouts for numerous groups – the Rolling Stones, the Mamas & the Papas, the Beach Boys, the Byrds, the Doors, Simon & Garfunkel among many others – he also photographed film legends like Rita Hayworth, Dean Martin, and Natalie Wood. As the primary celebrity photographer for dozens of magazines worldwide, Webster captured entertainers including Igor Stravinsky, Barbra Streisand, Jack Nicholson and American presidents Ronald Reagan and Bill Clinton. Webster's work was collected in the award-winning book, Big Shots: The Photography of Guy Webster, published by Insight Editions. His passion for photography was matched by his love of Italian motorcycles; his personal collection of bikes considered among the world's finest. He spent the later part of his life in Ojai, California, where he volunteered and taught photography at the Oak Grove School (Ojai, California). He died there on February 5, 2019, as a result of complications arising from diabetes and liver cancer.

== Early life ==
Guy Webster was born on September 14, 1939, in Los Angeles into a show business family. His parents were Gloria Benguiat Webster and Paul Francis Webster, an Academy Award–winning songwriter who won Oscars for his lyrics to "Secret Love", "Love is a Many-Splendored Thing", and "The Shadow of Your Smile". His younger brother, Mona Roger Webster, is a conceptual artist, real estate investor, and long time resident of Venice, California.

Webster grew up in the heart of celebrity-studded Beverly Hills, on North Crescent Drive. His neighbors included the Marx Brothers and Fred Astaire. Dean Martin's children were part of Webster's own "Rat Pack". Songwriters like Sammy Cahn were regulars for dinner; many nights spent at the family piano while Cahn, Duke Ellington, or Andre Previn joined Webster senior to work on songs as Guy took notes. His mother liked to paint and sketch but her primary concern was making sure her husband and two children were well-attended to.

== Education ==
He attended Beverly Hills High School, with the expectation that upon graduation he would follow his father's admonition to enroll at Yale University and pursue a stable career in finance. He rejected that path; having come under the influence of rock 'n’ roll and blues music, he was keen to chart his own path. He earned a bachelor's degree from Whittier College. In 1961, he reported for six months of military duty at Fort Ord in Monterey, California, and served in the Army reserves. Owing to his deeply felt philosophical beliefs he declared himself a conscientious objector. His superiors responded by directing him away from more martial concerns, assigning him the task of teaching new recruits how to use a camera. "They asked if I knew anything about photography. I lied and said I did... I was absolutely clueless." Upon leaving the army Webster enrolled at the Art Center College of Design in Pasadena, California. He studied fine-art photography, inspired by the work of Irving Penn. In the early '70s, while living in Europe, Webster resumed his study of art history at the University of Florence, Italy.

== Life and career ==
A childhood friend and Beverly Hills neighbor, Terry Melcher, son of Doris Day, was a record producer in the burgeoning music industry. He asked Guy to photograph a band he was working with, the Rip Chords, for the Columbia Records label. Another chance encounter with producer Lou Adler led to Webster shooting the cover of the Mamas and Papas debut album, If You Can Believe Your Eyes and Ears for Adler's Dunhill Records. The image became a cause célèbre; it depicted the band lounging in a bathtub next to a toilet. Record distributors found it distasteful and threatened to pull it; it was Adler's idea to slap a sticker on it, playing into the notoriety but also making it palatable for family-friendly stores to stock. Webster quickly became an in-demand photographer, credits accumulating like the hit artists he was documenting. He shot Bob Dylan’s legendary 1965 press conference at Columbia Records studio on Sunset Blvd; he framed Simon & Garfunkel in L.A.’s Franklin Canyon Park for the cover of their iconic Sounds of Silence album. In December, 1965, and again in March, 1966, Webster corralled the Rolling Stones for two photo sessions which resulted in the covers for Big Hits (High Tide and Green Grass) and the world-wide (except the United States) album Aftermath. His most famous cover shoot was for the Doors first album in 1967. The group's charismatic front man, Jim Morrison, had already earned a reputation for being an inscrutable, hard-to- manage presence. Webster found an artful way to balance the group’s identity against Morrison’s renegade tendencies.

Webster's artistry came to define much of what came to be called The Summer of Love. He was present at the Monterey International Pop Festival; his pictures of Laura Nyro, Janis Joplin and the Who captured their era-defining stature. Similarly, his shot of Jimi Hendrix at the Hollywood Bowl in August, 1967, showcased both artists’ at their creative best. After Monterey, Webster was contacted by Herb Alpert, the head of A&M Records, to head up their graphic design department. He stayed there for the next few years, overseeing a golden age in album art work, as listeners became as enamored with the record sleeves as much as the music. It was a demanding job, keeping musician's hours, managing corporate responsibilities with creative challenges. "The musicians treated me with great respect and I treated them exactly the same. I always said to them, 'Let's have fun, because you’ll probably never want to pose together again. You’re going to get into arguments over money. And this time next year you may well be gone.’ I hope I said it with humor... "I never got sucked into the entertainment lifestyle that destroyed some of my friends. I had some emotional distancing—no doubt a gift from my father ... I had my life with a wife, three kids, and blues on the stereo. Howlin' Wolf was my escape." In the early '70s, Webster left Los Angeles and decamped for Europe, taking up residence first in Spain, then Italy. He would on occasion accept an assignment to shoot actors on location – Jack Nicholson, Sean Connery, Jeff Bridges, John Belushi among them. It was during his time there that his love of motorbikes took center stage. He began collecting Italian cycles from the '50s, '60s and '70s, riding them down to North Africa. His first vintage purchase was a Moto Guzzi Falcone racer which he found in Florence, Italy. His collection would come to include rarefied models from Ducati, Gilera, Laverda. Tired of flying back and forth from Europe to the States for work, he returned to America and Southern California for good in 1979. Befitting his wide-ranging interests, subjects for his photo shoots expanded into the realm of the other fine arts: writers Ray Bradbury, Truman Capote, classical giants Igor Stravinsky and Zubin Mehta submitted to the Webster treatment. It was during this period that Webster joined Leonard Koren, founder of Wet: The Magazine of Gourmet Bathing, as president and chief photographer. Guy moved to Ojai, California, in 1981 but continued to work weekly at his studio in Venice Beach, California. When in Ojai he volunteered and taught photography to students at Oak Grove School. Health issues dogged him in his last years, including a stroke and heart surgery in 2015. He remained, nonetheless, a vital presence in his adopted home town since 1981 of Ojai.

Webster owned one of the world's largest and most valuable collections of motorcycles. In later years, he would occasionally sell tickets for motorcycle enthusiasts to examine his collection.

Webster died on February 5, 2019.

== Notable album covers ==
Year	Artist	Album
1964	The Rip Chords	Hey Little Cobra
1965	Barry McGuire	Eve of Destruction
1965	The Byrds	Turn! Turn! Turn!
1966	The Rolling Stones	Big Hits (High Tide and Green Grass)
1966	The Mamas & the Papas	If You Can Believe Your Eyes and Ears
1966	Paul Revere & the Raiders	Just Like Us!
1966	Simon & Garfunkel	Sounds of Silence
1966	The Rolling Stones	Aftermath
1966	The Hollies	Stop! Stop! Stop! (U.S. release of For Certain Because)
1967	The Turtles	Happy Together
1967	Tim Buckley	Goodbye and Hello
1967	Spirit	Spirit
1967	Captain Beefheart & His Magic Band	Strictly Personal
1967	The Doors	The Doors
1967	Taj Mahal	Taj Mahal
1968	The Byrds	The Notorious Byrd Brothers
1968	Nico	The Marble Index
1968	Procol Harum	Shine on Brightly
1970	Carole King	Writer

== Personal life ==
=== Children ===
Webster had three children from his first marriage: Erin, Michael and Sarah Webster; and two daughters from his second marriage: Jessie and Merry Webster.

=== Relationships ===
Webster's first marriage was to Bettie Beall, and his second marriage was to model Leone James in 1980. Webster had a younger brother, Mona Roger Webster.

=== Religion ===
Webster described himself as a "left-winger, atheist, and a Buddhist". His parents were both of Jewish ancestry; through the years they studied various religions.
