= The Papas & the Mamas =

Studio album by the Mamas and the Papas
- Released: May 1968
- Recorded: 1967–68
- Studios: John and Michelle Phillips’ personal studio at their home
- Genres: Folk rock; rock; psychedelic rock
- Length: 39:32
- Label: Dunhill
- Producer: Lou Adler

The Mamas and the Papas chronology
Farewell to the First Golden Era (1967)	The Papas & the Mamas (1968)	16 of Their Greatest Hits (1969)

Professional ratings
Review scores
Source	Rating
AllMusic	3/5 stars
Rolling Stone	favorable

The Papas & the Mamas is the fourth studio album by the American folk rock vocal group the Mamas and the Papas, released in 1968. The album peaked at number 15 on the Billboard Top LP's chart.

== Recording ==
The album was recorded at the home of John and Michelle Phillips, although with the same production team as on previous albums. Their original studio, Western Recorders, switched to solid state technology, and Phillips and Adler purchased the tube-based board they had done their previous recordings with, and installed it in their new studio. In retrospect, Adler has said that the recording space was not well made, and the sound quality was not well-suited for a vocal group.

With the exception of the very successful cover version of "Dream a Little Dream of Me", the album's subject matter is often downbeat and world-weary, most notably in the lyrical content of "Safe in My Garden", "Mansions", "Too Late" and "Rooms".

All the material was new upon release with the exception of "Twelve Thirty", which had been released as a single in August 1967 as "Twelve Thirty (Young Girls Are Coming to the Canyon)".

The song "Meditation Mama" featured the first lead vocal ever on a Mamas and the Papas track by John Phillips. All four members of the band contribute lead as well as backing vocals on this album.

The song Midnight Voyage which closes the album has the distinction of being one of a very few Mamas and Papas tracks to be released with false starts and studio chatter, giving the listener a brief snippet of how a song comes together.

Although it was the first album from the group not to peak in the top ten, it was a commercial success upon its release, becoming the band's fourth and last top 20 album in America and producing two hit singles (one of which, "Dream a Little Dream of Me", would begin Cass Elliot's solo career).

This album is included in its entirety on All the Leaves Are Brown, a retrospective compilation of the band's first four albums and various singles.

"Twelve Thirty (Young Girls Are Coming to the Canyon)" is heard during a pivotal scene in Quentin Tarantino's 2019 film Once Upon a Time... in Hollywood.

The song "The Right Somebody to Love", with the lead vocal by Michelle Phillips (originally performed by Shirley Temple in the film Captain January), opened both sides of the album. A later reissue on CDs omitted the version from the second side and included only the first part of the song.

== Album artwork ==
Author of the original gatefold cover art package was Gary Burden. There are two photos of members' faces (by Tad Diltz) with different expressions. The front cover contained two flaps which, when folded, created interchangeable funny faces mixed from the heads of girls and boys. John Lennon later used a similar idea for his cover art of the LP Walls And Bridges.

== Track listing ==
Side one

1. "The Right Somebody to Love – part 1" (Jack Yellen, Lew Pollack) – 0:43
2. "Safe in My Garden" (John Phillips) – 3:15
3. "Meditation Mama (Transcendental Women Travels)" (John Phillips, Lou Adler) – 4:25
4. "For the Love of Ivy" (J. Phillips, Denny Doherty) – 3:45
5. "Dream a Little Dream of Me" (Fabian Andre, Wilbur Schwandt, Gus Kahn) – 3:17
6. "Mansions" (John Phillips) – 3:47

Side two

1. "The Right Somebody to Love – part 2" (Jack Yellen, Lew Pollack) – 0:20
2. "Gemini Childe" (John Phillips) – 4:07
3. "Nothing's Too Good for My Little Girl" (Ned Wynn) – 3:09
4. "Too Late" (John Phillips) – 4:10
5. "Twelve Thirty (Young Girls Are Coming to the Canyon)" (Cass Elliot, John Phillips) – 3:26
6. "Rooms" (John Phillips) – 2:52
7. "Midnight Voyage" (John Phillips) – 3:13

== Personnel ==
- Denny Doherty – lead and background vocals
- Cass Elliot – lead and background vocals
- John Phillips – guitar (tracks A1–B4, B6), lead vocals (A3), background vocals
- Michelle Phillips – lead and background vocals
- "Doctor" Eric Hord – guitar (tracks A1–B4, B6)
- Hal Blaine – drums, percussion
- Larry Knechtel – keyboards
- Joe Osborn – bass guitar (tracks A1–B4, B6)
- Paul Downing – guitar (track B5)
- John York – bass guitar (track B5)

Technical

- Peter Pilafian – engineer
- Lou Adler – producer
- Tad Diltz – album photos
- Gary Burden – art direction, package design

== Charts ==
Weekly chart performance
Chart (1968–1969)	Peak position
US Billboard Top LP's	15
US Cash Box Top 100 Albums	10
US Record World 100 Top LPs	6

Year-end chart performance
Chart (1968)	Ranking
US Billboard	83
US Cash Box	36
