= If You Can Believe Your Eyes and Ears =

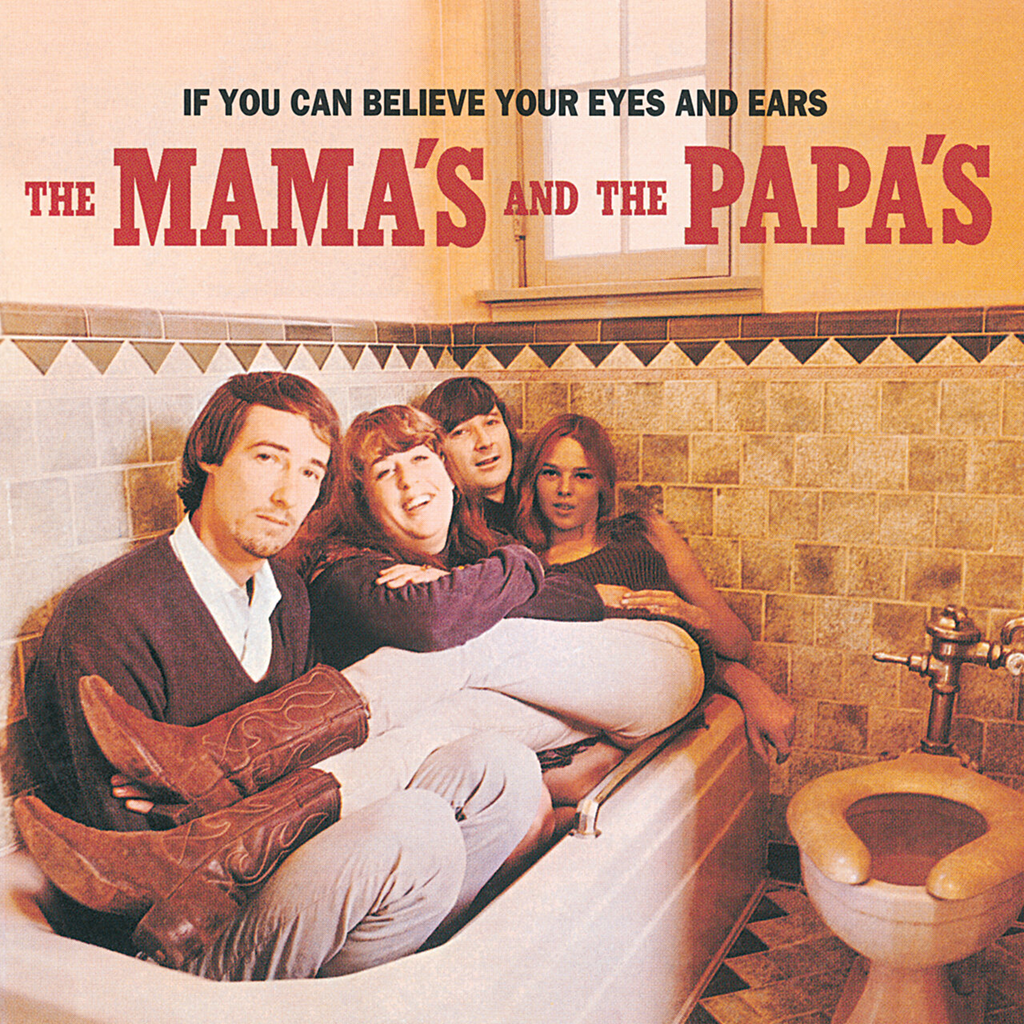

Studio album by the Mamas & the Papas
- Released: February 28, 1966
- Recorded: October–December 1965
- Genres: Folk rock; pop rock; pop; soul; sunshine pop
- Length: 34:50
- Label: Dunhill
- Producer: Lou Adler

The Mamas & the Papas chronology
If You Can Believe Your Eyes and Ears (1966)	The Mamas & the Papas (1966)

Singles from If You Can Believe Your Eyes and Ears
- 1. "Go Where You Wanna Go" Released: 1965; 2. "California Dreamin'" Released: December 8, 1965; 3. "Monday, Monday" Released: March 1966

If You Can Believe Your Eyes and Ears is the debut studio album by the American-Canadian folk rock vocal group the Mamas & the Papas (stylized as The Mama's and the Papa's), released on February 28, 1966 through Dunhill Records. It is the band's only album to reach number one on the Billboard 200. In the UK, the album was released as The Mama's and the Papa's on June 10, 1966, on RCA Victor, and reached number three on the Record Retailer Albums Chart.

In 2003, If You Can Believe Your Eyes and Ears was ranked number 127 on Rolling Stone magazine's list of the 500 greatest albums of all time, with its rank rising to number 112 in the 2012 revision.

== Cover art ==
At least six versions of the album cover were produced:

- No. 1: The original cover (shown at upper right) features the group in a bathroom, sitting in a bathtub with a toilet in the corner. These were pulled from stores after the toilet was judged indecent; since then they have become a collector's item, with one copy selling at an auction for $300.
- No. 2: Most of the toilet bowl is covered with a scroll listing the presence of "California Dreamin'" on the album.
- No. 3: Similar to No. 2, most of the toilet is covered, in this case by a bright yellow rectangle listing the presence of "Monday, Monday" and "California Dreamin'". This version was released in Canada.
- No. 4: Two additional songs from the album are shown on the scroll: "Monday, Monday" and "I Call Your Name".
- No. 5: Same as No. 4 but with a gold record award blurb added (in black) to the left of the group.
- No. 6: Black cover with a closely cropped shot of the group that hid the fact that the picture was taken in a bathroom.

The cover art was produced and shot by photographer Guy Webster.

The cover shows the artist as "The Mama's and the Papa's", a grammatical error that has not been corrected on any of the album's reissues.

== Mixes ==
The stereo mix of the album is included on All the Leaves Are Brown (2001), a double CD compilation consisting of the band's first four albums and various singles, as well as on The Mamas & the Papas Complete Anthology (2004), a four-CD box set released in the UK. The mono mix of the album was remastered and reissued on vinyl by Sundazed Music in 2010, and on CD the following year.

== Critical reception ==
=== Contemporary reviews ===
Professional ratings
Review scores
Source	Rating
Record Mirror	4/5 stars

Contemporary reviews of If You Can Believe Your Eyes and Ears were highly positive and frequently emphasized the Mamas & the Papas' vocal blend and harmonic style. Record Mirror called the album "very sweet", noting its "clever harmonising" and describing it as "good listening". David F. Wagner of The Post-Crescent described the group as part of a "limited, but forceful" trend of "good time music" and wrote that their voices "play against, yet complement, each other through counterpoint harmonies", resulting in a sound "as fresh as today". The Journal & Courier's Angelyn Rizzo wrote that their sound featured "marvelous harmony" along with "unusual contrapuntal harmonies and unique individual vocal arrangements" that "make the album an entire pleasantry". Norman Barry of the Sunday Independent argued that the album demonstrated the group's "versatility, originality, harmony and above all, their willingness to experiment and create".

Bill Hilton of the Santa Barbara News-Press expressed surprise at liking a folk rock-based record but described the album as "good to listen to", praising the group's "uncommon blend of voices" and writing that they "harmonize beautifully" without being overshadowed by instrumentation. The Daily Telegraph's Anne McDonald called the album "brilliant" and said their "voices that blend so perfectly" and orchestral backing "create a feeling of spine-tingling nostalgia". Ernie Santosuosso of The Boston Globe wrote that the group "can do no wrong with a song" and compared their role in folk-rock to the Four Freshmen's position in jazz vocal music. He highlighted their "meticulous sounds and feeling for harmonics" and described the album as containing "refreshingly creative choral magic".

Looking back at If You Can Believe Your Eyes and Ears a year later, critics regarded it as their defining work for the Mamas & the Papas and emphasized its importance. Robert Christgau called the album "a classical record with a new approach", and Paul Krassner commented that the group "feel good to hear". Richard Goldstein stated that the album "has the strongest composition on it" and argued that it "influenced the way other performers use harmony", while also noting that later records were "really only remakes of this first unique album". Robert Fulford likewise described it as the album that "defines them". The Star Weekly wrote that the "crystal voices" of the group were heard at their best on the debut and added that its songs "would make the album a significant contribution to the pop-rock scene if they never cut another".

=== Retrospective reviews ===
Professional ratings
Review scores
Source	Rating
AllMusic	4.5/5 stars
Encyclopedia of Popular Music	4/5 stars
The Great Rock Discography	7/10
MusicHound Rock	4/5 stars
Music Story	5/5 stars
Record Collector	4/5 stars
The Republican	(1998) (2011)
Rolling Stone	4.5/5 stars
The Rolling Stone Album Guide	(Note: The Rolling Stone Album Guide (1992, 3rd ed.)) (Note: (The New) Rolling Stone Album Guide (2004, 4th ed.).)
Tom Hull – on the Web	B+

The album received a positive retrospective review in Rolling Stone, in which critic Rob Sheffield remarked "The Mamas and the Papas celebrated all the sin and sleaze of Sixties L.A. with folksy harmonies, acoustic guitars, and songs that told inquiring minds way more than they wanted to know. And on their January 1966 debut, If You Can Believe Your Eyes and Ears, they somehow made it all sound groovy." He described the album as a dark look at L.A. culture that sounds accessible and optimistic thanks in large part to Lou Adler's production. Bruce Eder wrote for AllMusic that the album "embraced folk-rock, pop/rock, pop, and soul, and also reflected the kind of care that acts like the Beatles were putting into their records at the time." He added that it had a stronger polish than the group's other albums, in part because it predated the personal conflicts that tainted their later works. The album was included in Robert Dimery's 1001 Albums You Must Hear Before You Die.

== Track listing ==
Side one
No.	Title	Writer(s)	Length
1.	"Monday, Monday"	John Phillips	3:28
2.	"Straight Shooter"	J. Phillips	2:58
3.	"Got a Feelin'"	J. Phillips; Denny Doherty	2:53
4.	"I Call Your Name"	John Lennon; Paul McCartney	2:38
5.	"Do You Wanna Dance"	Bobby Freeman	3:00
6.	"Go Where You Wanna Go"	J. Phillips	2:29
Total length:			17:26

Side two
No.	Title	Writer(s)	Length
1.	"California Dreamin'"	J. Phillips; Michelle Phillips	2:42
2.	"Spanish Harlem"	Jerry Leiber; Phil Spector	3:22
3.	"Somebody Groovy"	J. Phillips	3:16
4.	"Hey Girl"	J. Phillips; M. Phillips	2:30
5.	"You Baby"	Steve Barri; P. F. Sloan	2:22
6.	"The 'In' Crowd"	Billy Page	3:12
Total length:			17:24

== Personnel ==
The Mamas & the Papas

- Denny Doherty – vocals
- Cass Elliot – vocals
- John Phillips – vocals, guitar
- Michelle Phillips – vocals

Additional musicians

- P. F. Sloan – guitars, additional vocals
- Larry Knechtel – keyboards
- Hal Blaine – drums, percussion
- Joe Osborn – bass guitar
- Bud Shank – flute solo on "California Dreamin' "
- Peter Pilafian – electric violin

Technical

- Lou Adler – producer
- Bones Howe – engineer
- Guy Webster – photography

== Charts ==
=== Weekly charts ===
Chart (1966)	Peak position
UK Disc and Music Echo Top Ten LPs	5
UK Melody Maker Top Ten LPs	3
UK New Musical Express Best Selling LPs	2
UK Record Retailer LPs Chart	3
US Billboard Top LP's	1
US Cash Box Top 100 Albums	2
US Record World 100 Top LP's	2

=== Year-end charts ===
Chart (1966)	Peak position
US Billboard Top LP's	6
US Cash Box Top 100 Albums	12

Chart (1967)	Peak position
US Billboard Top LP's	25

== Certifications ==
Certifications for If You Can Believe Your Eyes and Ears
Region	Certification	Certified units/sales
New Zealand (RMNZ)	Gold	7,500^{‡}
United States (RIAA)	Platinum	1,000,000^{‡}
^{‡} Sales+streaming figures based on certification alone.

== See also ==
- List of controversial album art
