= Deliver (The Mamas & the Papas album) =

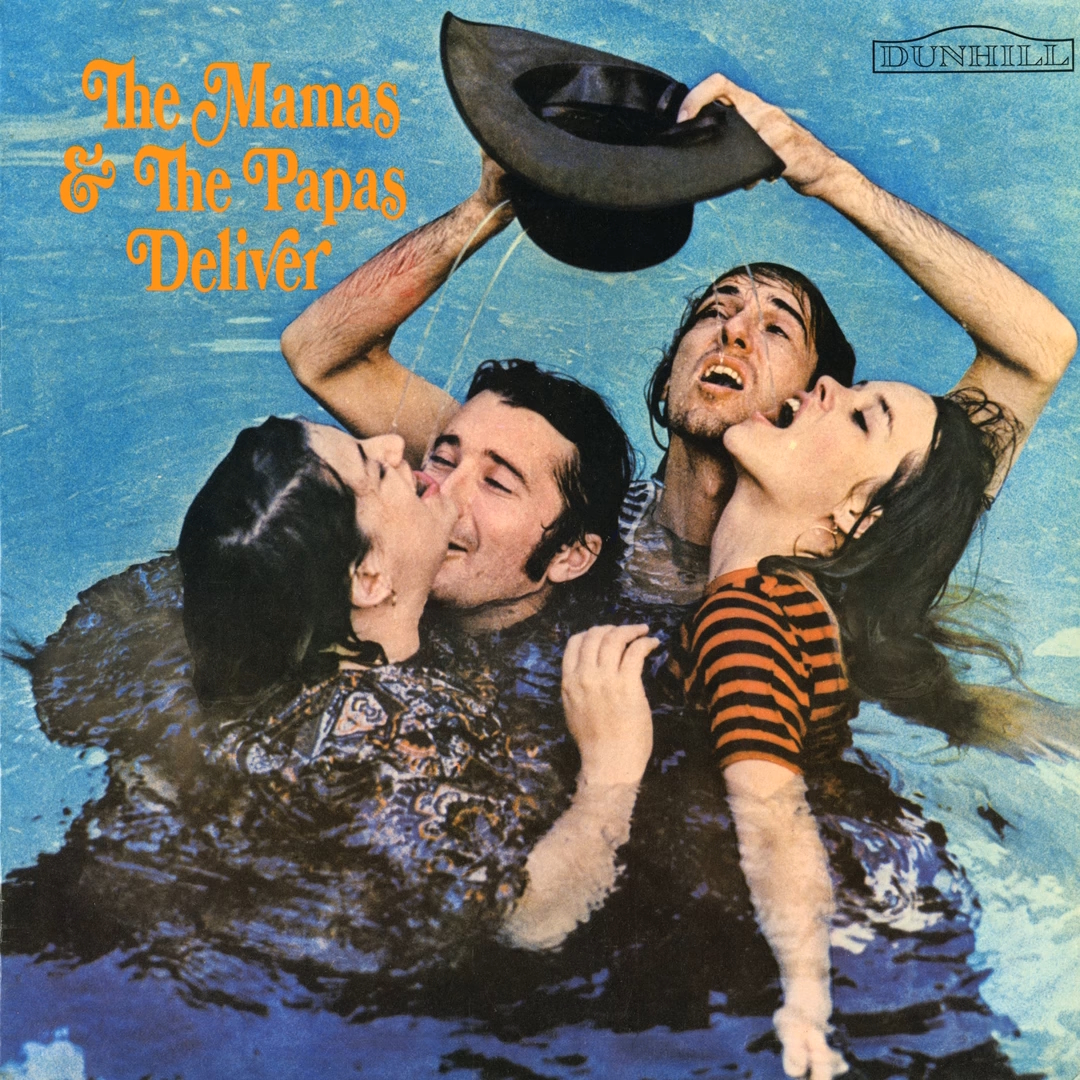

Studio album by the Mamas & the Papas
- Released: February 2, 1967
- Genres: Pop; folk rock
- Length: 35:04
- Label: Dunhill
- Producer: Lou Adler

The Mamas & the Papas chronology
| The Mamas & the Papas (1966) | Deliver (1967) | Farewell to the First Golden Era (1967) |

Singles from Deliver
- 1. "Look Through My Window" Released: 1966; 2. "Dedicated to the One I Love" Released: 1967; 3. "Creeque Alley" Released: 1967

Professional ratings
Review scores
| Source | Rating |
|---|---|
| AllMusic | 4/5 stars |

Deliver (also known as The Mamas & the Papas Deliver) is the third studio album by the Mamas & the Papas, released in February 1967 on Dunhill Records. One song, "Creeque Alley", outlines the unique circumstances in which the band met and formed. Other songs on the album are covers of popular hits from years past.

== Title ==
The album's title was an in-joke among the group, as recording commenced shortly after Cass Elliot announced that she was pregnant with her daughter, Owen. Given the social stigma of unwed mothers at the time, both the pregnancy and the birth had been kept a closely guarded secret from the public and press, and the LP's name was meant to imply that Elliot and the others had "delivered" a newborn creation.

== Release ==
The album debuted on Billboard's Top LPs chart on March 18, 1967, and reached its peak position of No. 2 just three weeks later. It spent a total of 55 weeks on the Top LPs chart.

Three of the album's singles reached the Billboard Hot 100 chart: "Look Through My Window" peaked at No. 24 (November 26, 1966), "Dedicated to the One I Love" at No. 2 (March 25, 1967), and "Creeque Alley" at No. 5 (June 3, 1967).

The album was first issued on CD in 1988 (MCAD-31044) and is included in its entirety on All the Leaves Are Brown, a retrospective compilation of the band's first four albums and various singles.

== Original track listing ==
All tracks composed by John Phillips except where indicated.

=== Side one ===
1. "Dedicated to the One I Love" (Ralph Bass, Lowman Pauling) – 2:56
2. "My Girl" (Smokey Robinson, Ronald White) – 3:35
3. "Creeque Alley" (John Phillips, Michelle Phillips) – 3:45
4. "Sing for Your Supper" (Lorenz Hart, Richard Rodgers) – 2:46
5. "Twist and Shout" (Phil Medley, Bert Russell) – 2:54
6. "Free Advice" (John Phillips, Michelle Phillips) – 3:15

=== Side two ===
1. "Look Through My Window" – 3:05
2. "Boys & Girls Together" – 3:15
3. "String Man" (John Phillips, Michelle Phillips) – 2:59
4. "Frustration" (Instrumental) – 2:50
5. "Did You Ever Want to Cry" – 2:53
6. "John's Music Box" – 1:00

== Personnel ==
- Denny Doherty – vocals
- Cass Elliot – vocals
- John Phillips – vocals, guitar
- Michelle Phillips – vocals
- Jill Gibson – vocals on 11, uncredited
- Scott McKenzie – 12-string acoustic guitar on 03, guitar on 06
- Hal Blaine – drums, percussion
- Larry Knechtel – keyboards
- Jim Horn – flute, saxophone
- Joe Osborn – bass guitar
- "Doctor" Eric Hord – guitar
- P.F. Sloan – guitar
- Tommy Tedesco – guitar on 01, 02, 03, 05, 07, 08, 09
- Gary Coleman – percussion, bells, marimba

== Chart performance ==
=== Weekly charts ===
| Chart (1967–68) | Peak position |
|---|---|
| Canada RPM Top 25 LPs | 1 |
| UK Disc and Music Echo Top Ten LPs | 7 |
| UK Melody Maker Top Ten LPs | 6 |
| UK New Musical Express Britain's Top 15 LPs | 7 |
| UK Record Retailer LPs Chart | 4 |
| US Billboard Top LP's | 2 |
| US Cash Box Top 100 Albums | 1 |
| US Record World 100 Top LP's | 1 |
| West German Musikmarkt LP Hit Parade | 30 |

=== Year-end charts ===
| Chart (1967) | Peak position |
|---|---|
| US Billboard Top LP's | 24 |
| US Cash Box Top 100 Albums | 14 |

== Certifications ==
Certifications for Deliver
| Region | Certification | Certified units/sales |
|---|---|---|
| United States (RIAA) | Gold | 500,000^{^} |
^{^} Shipments figures based on certification alone.
