= Glad to Be Unhappy =

1936 popular song

Song
- Published: 1936
- Composer: Richard Rodgers
- Lyricist: Lorenz Hart

"Glad to Be Unhappy" is a popular song with music by Richard Rodgers and lyrics by Lorenz Hart. It was introduced in their 1936 musical On Your Toes, sung by Doris Carson and David Morris, although it was not popular at the time, as there was only one recording of the song. In the 1937 London production, it was sung by Gina Malo and Eddie Pola. The song was performed in the 1954 Broadway revival by Kay Coulter and Joshua Shelley.

== The Mamas & the Papas ==
"Glad to Be Unhappy"
- West German picture sleeve

Single by the Mamas & the Papas

from the album Golden Era Vol. 2
- B-side: "Hey Girl"
- Released: October 1967
- Recorded: 1967
- Genre: Pop rock, folk rock, psychedelic pop
- Length: 1:40
- Label: Dunhill
- Songwriters: Richard Rodgers, Lorenz Hart
- Producer: Lou Adler

The Mamas & the Papas singles chronology
"Twelve Thirty" (1967)	"Glad to Be Unhappy" (1967)	"Dancing Bear" (1967)

Originally recorded for an appearance on "Rodgers and Hart Today", an episode of ABC Stage 67, the Mamas and the Papas' version of the song was released as a single at the end of 1967, reaching No. 26 on the Billboard Hot 100 chart. It was issued to keep the group in the charts while awaiting the completion of the group's fourth album, The Papas & The Mamas. However, the song does not appear on that album; it was instead used to promote the group's second greatest hits package, entitled Golden Era Vol. 2 (1968). It is the last of the Mamas & the Papas' singles produced in a professional studio; subsequent singles were recorded in John and Michelle Phillips' home studio. The mono single differs slightly from the stereo album mix, as was common for the group's singles, in that a few additional words are sung during the first chorus in the stereo mix.

The B-side of the single is "Hey Girl", a track from the group's first album.

=== Charts ===
Chart (1967–1968)	Peak position
US Billboard Hot 100	26

== Other notable recordings ==
- Bea Wain (1939)
- Lee Wiley (February 1940)
- Lena Horne (October 1946)
- Helen Merrill (February 1954)
- Sammy Davis Jr., on Starring Sammy Davis Jr. (1955)
- Frank Sinatra, on In the Wee Small Hours (recorded February 8, 1955)
- Ella Fitzgerald, on Ella at Zardi's (recorded February 2, 1956)
- Billie Holiday, on Lady in Satin (recorded February 21, 1958)
- Chris Connor, on Sings Ballads of the Sad Cafe (recorded January 29, 1959)
- Eric Dolphy, on Outward Bound (1960)
- Clare Fischer, on Easy Livin' (recorded August 8, 1963; released in limited edition 1966; reissued 1968)
- Paul Desmond, on Glad to Be Unhappy (1965)
- Nancy Wilson, on But Beautiful (1969)
- Barbra Streisand, on Barbra Streisand...And Other Musical Instruments (1973)
- The Great Jazz Trio, on Love for Sale (1976)
- Carmen McRae, on The Carmen McRae-Betty Carter Duets (1987)
- Wynton Marsalis, on Standard Time, Vol. 5: The Midnight Blues (1998)
- Etienne Daho (2007)
- Chris Botti (featuring John Mayer on lead vocals), on Chris Botti in Boston (2008)
- Nels Cline, on Lovers (2016)
