= I Saw Her Again =

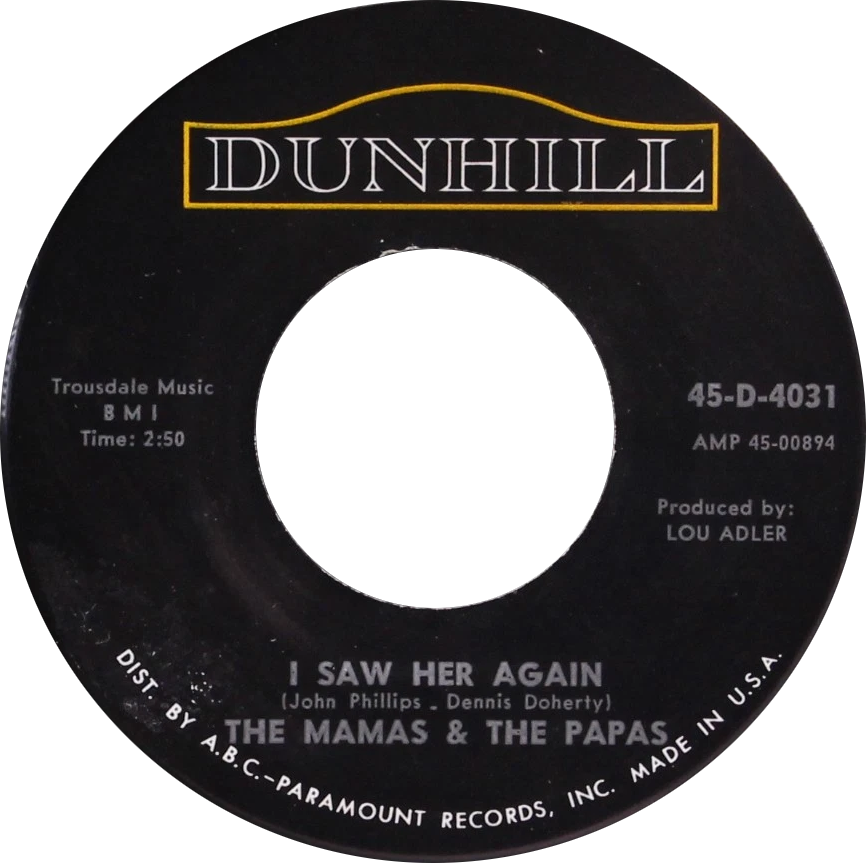
- Side A of the US single

Single by the Mamas & the Papas

from the album The Mamas & the Papas
- B-side: "Even If I Could"
- Released: June 1966
- Recorded: April 1966
- Genre: Folk rock; sunshine pop
- Length: 3:10 (album); 2:50 (single)
- Label: Dunhill (U.S.); RCA Victor (Europe)
- Songwriters: John Phillips; Denny Doherty
- Producer: Lou Adler

The Mamas & the Papas singles chronology
"Monday, Monday" (1966)	"I Saw Her Again" (1966)	"Look Through My Window" (1966)

"I Saw Her Again" is a song recorded by the U.S. vocal group the Mamas & the Papas in 1966. Co-written by band members John Phillips and Denny Doherty, it was released as a single in June 1966, and peaked at number one on the RPM Canadian Singles Chart, number 11 on the UK Singles Chart, and number five on the Billboard Hot 100 pop singles chart the week of July 30, 1966. It appeared on their eponymous second album in September 1966.

One of the group's most popular songs, "I Saw Her Again" has been featured on numerous compilation albums and is frequently titled "I Saw Her Again Last Night", such as on the sleeve of their first hits collection Farewell to the First Golden Era in October 1967.

The mono 45 version omits the orchestra instrumental break and chorus that follows on the stereo mix, most likely to reduce the running time for the single release, as many 45's of that era were similarly edited for radio play. All Dunhill albums that include the song erroneously show the single playing time of 2:50 instead of the correct time of 3:10.

== Background ==
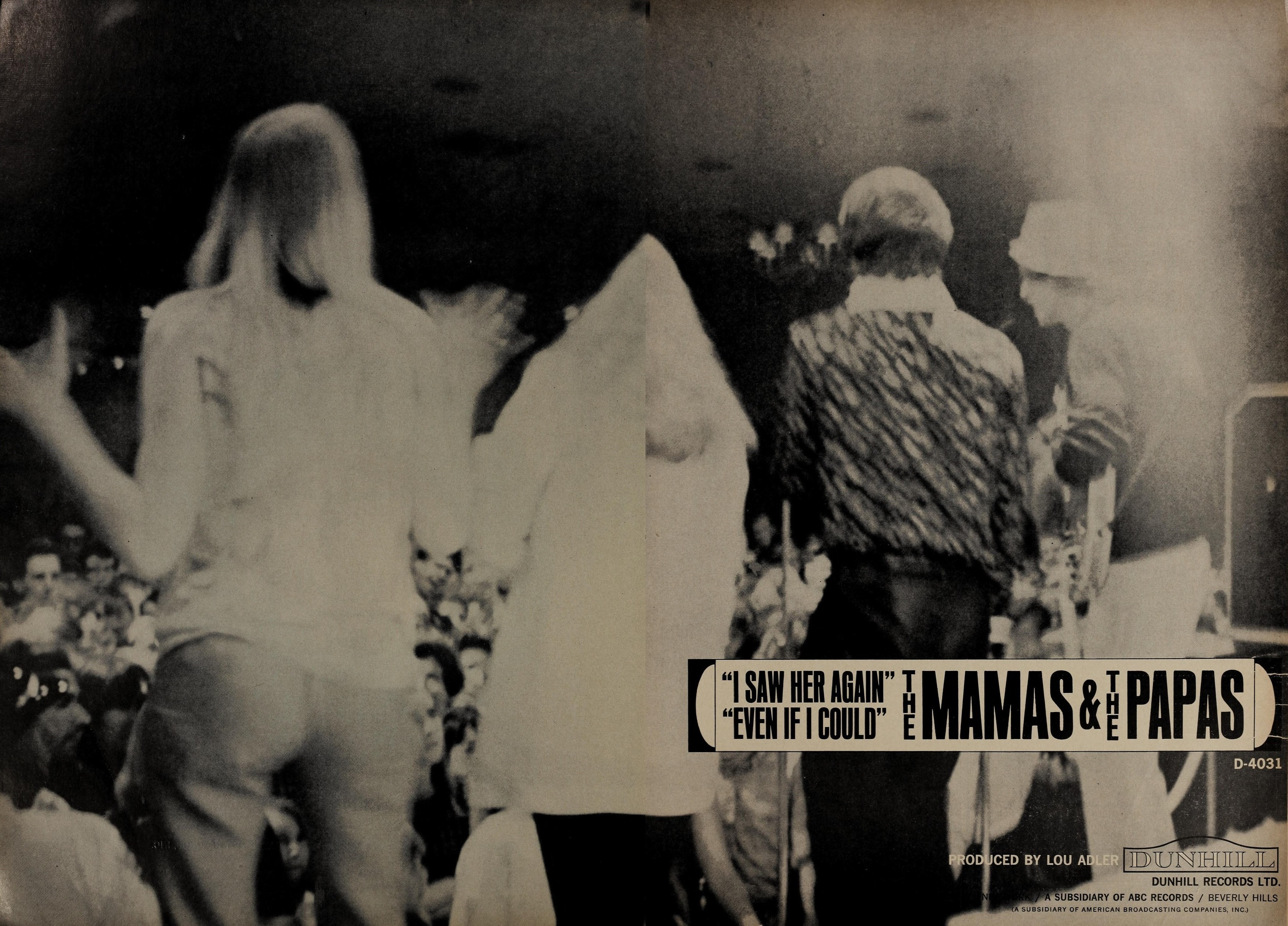
Cashbox advertisement, June 25, 1966

One of three songs co-written by the two male members of the group (the others being "Got a Feelin'" and "For the Love of Ivy"), "I Saw Her Again" was inspired by Doherty's brief affair with Michelle Phillips, then married to John Phillips, which, combined with an affair between Michelle Phillips and Gene Clark of The Byrds, resulted in the brief expulsion of Michelle from the group. While mixing the record, engineer Bones Howe punched in the coda vocals too early, inadvertently including Doherty's false start on the third chorus ("I saw her..."). Despite attempting to correct the error, the miscued vocal could still be heard on playback. Producer Lou Adler liked the effect and told Howe to leave it in the final mix.

Lou Adler has said that this song was specifically done to try and capture the flavor of what the Beatles had been doing, and that it was intentionally written to be a single.

== Reception ==
Billboard described the single as a "lyric rhythm rocker" that was a "hot follow-up to their 'Monday, Monday' smash". Cash Box described the song as a "rhythmic, pulsating folk-rock handclapper about a lucky fella who has finally found Miss Right."

== Music video ==
A light-hearted music video was made to promote the single, in which the four members arrive outside De Voss, a clothes shop on Sunset Plaza on the Sunset Strip in Los Angeles, by motorcycle (John) then car (in order, Michelle, Denny, Cass), with Michelle and Cass "examining" various garments and John spraying the air (and his glasses suddenly disappearing). Denny smokes a cigarette before they all lie on the floor and hurl clothes around. They then leave the store (first Denny and Cass, then John and Michelle), walking away from their vehicles. About ten seconds into the video, John and Michelle suddenly switch between their motorcycle and car before entering the store.

== Charts ==
Weekly chart performance for "I Saw Her Again"
Chart (1966)	Peak position
Australia (Kent Music Report)	9
Belgium (Ultratop 50 Flanders)	47
Canada (RPM 100)	1
Netherlands (Dutch Top 40)	8
Netherlands (Single Top 100)	6
New Zealand (Listener)	6
South Africa (Springbok)	3
Sweden (Kvällstoppen)	14
Sweden (Tio i Topp)	5
UK (OCC)	11
US (Billboard Hot 100)	5
US (Cash Box Top 100)	6
US (Record World 100 Top Pops)	4
West Germany (Media Control)	21
