= Twelve Thirty (Young Girls Are Coming to the Canyon) =

- French picture sleeve

Single by the Mamas & the Papas

from the album The Papas & The Mamas
- B-side: "Straight Shooter"
- Released: August 1967
- Genre: Pop rock; folk rock; psychedelic pop
- Length: 3:24
- Label: Dunhill
- Songwriter: John Phillips
- Producer: Lou Adler

The Mamas & the Papas singles chronology
"Creeque Alley" (1967)	"Twelve Thirty" (1967)	"Glad to Be Unhappy" (1967)

"Twelve Thirty" a.k.a. "Twelve-Thirty (Young Girls Are Coming to the Canyon)", is a song by the Mamas & the Papas.

After the release of the group's third album—Deliver—and their appearance as the closing act of the Monterey International Pop Festival, the group was scheduled to appear in England. The visit was catastrophic for the group, resulting in Cass Elliot leaving the group temporarily. The group had completed four tracks for their fourth album—initially titled Springboard—but when the group fracture occurred, progress on the new album stopped completely. Dunhill Records, hoping to keep the group in the public eye while personal matters were sorted out, released a greatest hits compilation, entitled Farewell to the First Golden Era, a smash hit at #5 on the charts, and certified gold. "Twelve Thirty," one of the completed songs from the fourth album, was included on the album in order to entice record buyers with new material, and simultaneously released as a single. "Twelve Thirty" would also appear on the now-retitled fourth album, The Papas & The Mamas, when finally released in the spring of 1968. The song peaked at number 20 as a single in the US, but failed to chart in the UK. The group would perform the song on The Ed Sullivan Show on 24 September 1967, in one of their last televised appearances as a group.

== Song origin ==
The song was written by John Phillips shortly after the band had relocated to Southern California in 1965. It is often cited as the band's last great single. In a 1968 interview, Phillips cited this arrangement as an example of "well-arranged two-part harmony moving in opposite directions".

Jim Ward of Rolling Stone, said "Twelve Thirty" was "the last recording of the self-proclaimed 'Golden Era'", he added, "It's probably the best realized song the group has recorded." Cash Box said that "a general aura of happiness...should give the public a feast on the new Mamas and Papas offering."

The song was inspired by Laurel Canyon, a neighborhood of Los Angeles, California. In the song, the writer says he used to live in "dark and dirty" New York City, where a broken clock on a church steeple was stuck at 12:30. John and Michelle Phillips had a difficult marital relationship then, and he compares this period to being in "the Canyon". A popular interpretation is that girl "groupies" would party into the night at the homes of show business types in the canyon and wander home the next morning, passing the house and engaging the songwriter in conversation as they went. The song was reportedly originally sung by Scott Mckenzie. The song fades out during a repeat of the final chorus. There is also an analysis of metaphor to epiphany or lifting of depression.

== Uses in popular culture ==
The song is featured in Drew Goddard's 2018 film Bad Times at the El Royale. The song is also featured during a pivotal scene in Quentin Tarantino's 2019 film Once Upon a Time in Hollywood. Chris Hemsworth's character in Bad Times at the El Royale is inspired by Charles Manson, while Tarantino's film portrays members of the Manson Family, as well as Michelle Phillips and Mama Cass. In his film the song plays prophetically as Manson murderers drive up Cielo Drive in Benedict Canyon.

== Track listing ==
7" Vinyl

1. "Twelve Thirty (Young Girls Are Coming to the Canyon)" (John Phillips) — 3:24
2. "Straight Shooter" (John Phillips) — 2:57

== Other recordings ==
- Gábor Szabó and the California Dreamers recorded a version on their 1967 album Wind, Sky and Diamonds (1967).
- Scott McKenzie released a version of the song on his 1967 debut album, The Voice of Scott McKenzie.
- Yugoslav rock band Bele Vrane released a cover of the song, alongside a cover of The Mamas & the Papas song "Hey Girl", on their 1968 EP Presenčenja (Surprises).
- Rufus Wainwright released a version on his 2023 album Folkocracy.
