= Look Through My Window =

- West German picture sleeve

Single by the Mamas & the Papas

from the album The Mamas & The Papas Deliver
- B-side: "Once Was a Time I Thought"
- Released: September 1966
- Genre: Soft rock; folk rock
- Length: 3:05
- Label: Dunhill
- Songwriter: John Phillips
- Producer: Lou Adler

The Mamas & the Papas singles chronology
"I Saw Her Again" (1966)	"Look Through My Window" (1966)	"Words of Love" (1966)

"Look Through My Window" is a song recorded by the American vocal group the Mamas & the Papas. It was written by John Philips, c. 1964 during a temporary separation from his partner, Michelle Phillips. The song was inspired by the fact that although John thought Michelle was out in California, she in fact was just blocks away in Greenwich Village. The mono version has a slightly longer fade-out so that the closing refrain "And the rain beats on my roof" is sung 9 times.

The song was the lead-off single from the group's third album The Mamas & The Papas Deliver. After all three of the group's prior singles reached the Top 5 on Billboard's Top 100 Chart in the US, expectations were high. Surprisingly, the song reached a peak of number 24 in the United States, and failed to chart in the UK. As a result—as recounted by John Phillips in his autobiography, Papa John—the decision was made to release another single from the group's second album.

Cash Box said that it is a "soft-rocker, complete with the lush ork workout that has become their trademark" that they thought would be a "sure-fire money-maker." Record World described it as a "moody piece of rock about loneliness."
