= Monday, Monday =

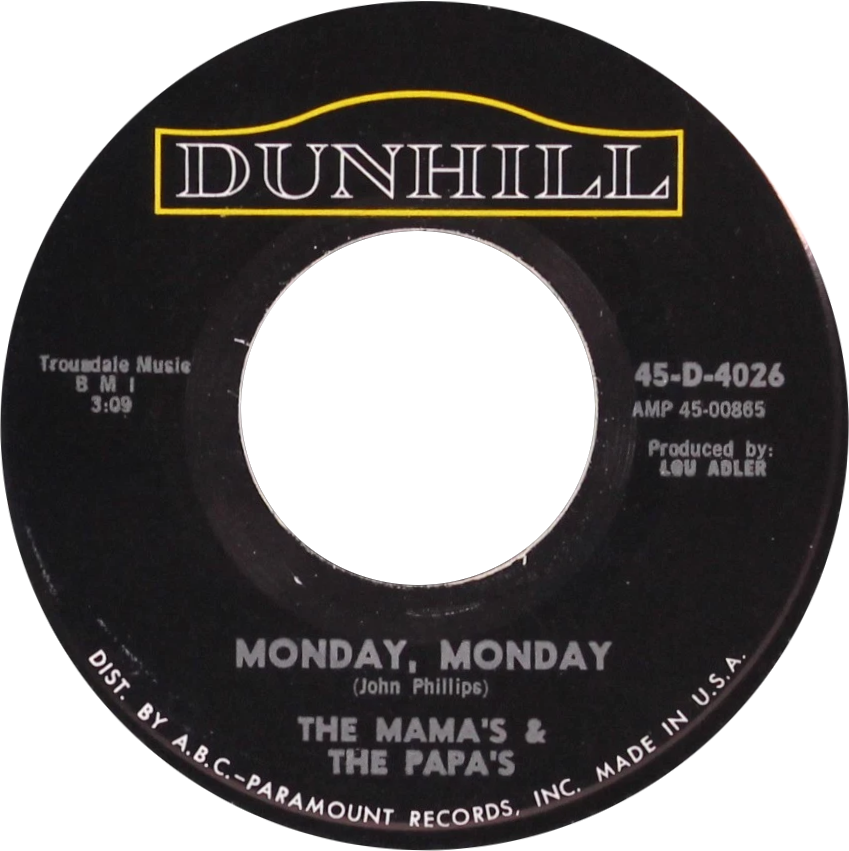
- Side A of the US single

Single by the Mamas & the Papas

from the album If You Can Believe Your Eyes and Ears
- B-side: "Got a Feelin'"
- Released: March 1966
- Recorded: December 16, 1965
- Studio: United Western, Los Angeles
- Genre: Pop, folk rock
- Length: 3:25 (album version); 3:09 (Single Version)
- Label: Dunhill
- Songwriter: John Phillips
- Producer: Lou Adler

The Mamas & the Papas singles chronology
"California Dreamin'" (1965)	"Monday, Monday" (1966)	"I Saw Her Again" (1966)

Audio
- "Monday, Monday" on YouTube

"Monday, Monday" is a 1966 song written by John Phillips and recorded by the Mamas & the Papas, with backing music by members of the Wrecking Crew for their 1966 album If You Can Believe Your Eyes and Ears. Denny Doherty was the lead vocalist. It was the group's only #1 hit on the U.S. Billboard Hot 100.

== Background ==
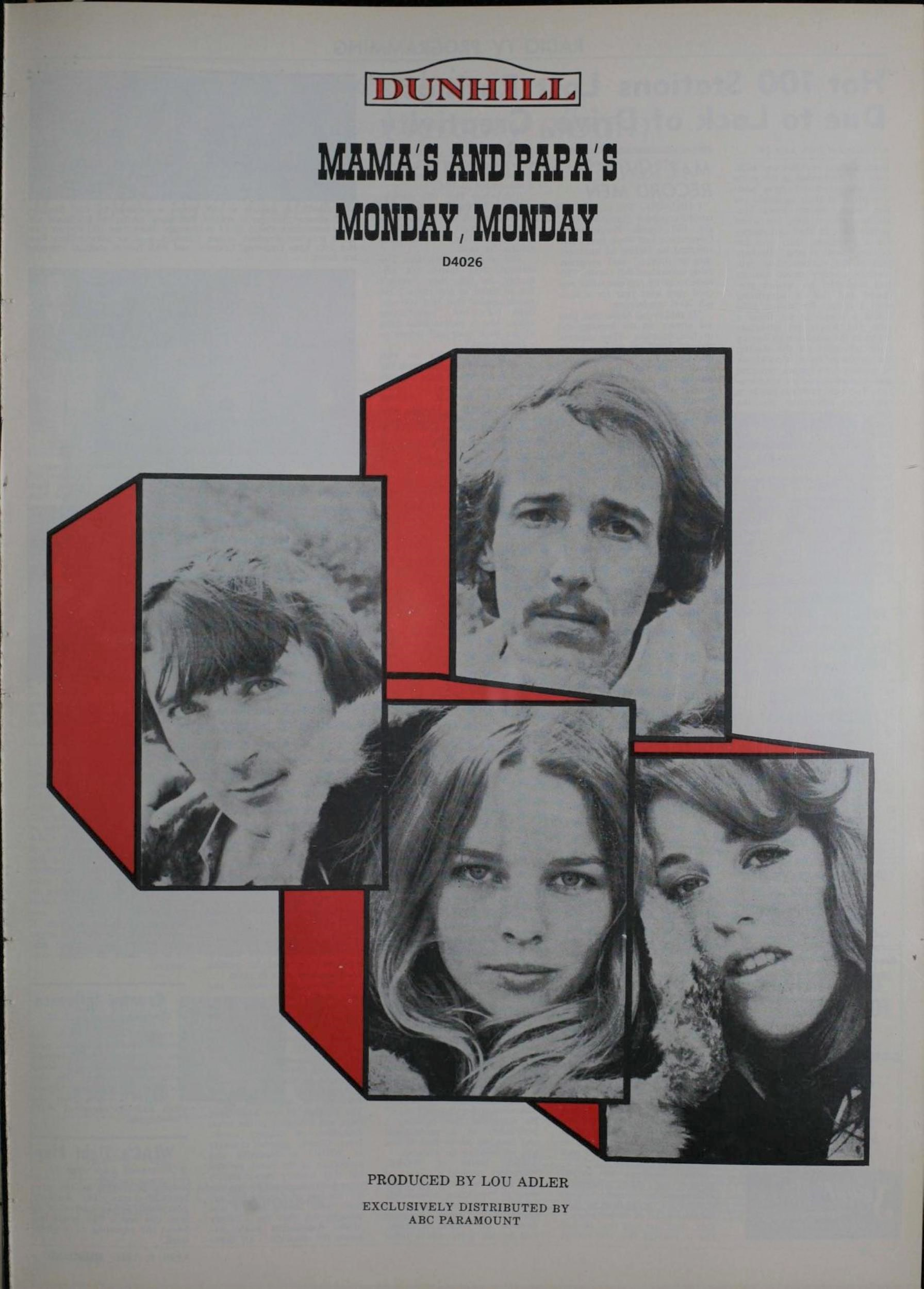
Billboard magazine advertisement, April 9, 1966

Phillips said that he wrote the song quickly, in about 20 minutes. However, after he initially presented it to the group during the late 1965 recording sessions for their debut album, he was met with strong resistance from band members Cass Elliot and Michelle Phillips, who hated it and called the song's subject matter 'pretentious'. Eventually, producer Lou Adler stepped in and took John's side, which resulted in its inclusion on the album and later release as a single. In the lyrics, the singer dislikes Mondays because the person he loved left him on that day: "Oh Monday mornin', you gave me no warnin' of what was to be." Singer Denny Doherty later recalled, "I liked the opening background vocals, the 'bah-da-da-da-da-dum,'...I thought that was cool. But nobody likes Monday, so I thought it was just a song about the working man. Nothing about it stood out to me. It was a dumb f***in’ song about a day of the week. By the time the rehearsals were over for the vocals, I thought, 'Thank God that’s over!'"

The song includes a pregnant pause before the coda, which modulates up a semitone. Succeeding "Good Lovin'" by the Young Rascals in the number one position, the event marked the first time in the history of the Billboard Hot 100 two songs with pregnant pauses were consecutive number one hits.

On March 2, 1967, the Mamas & the Papas won a Grammy Award for the song, in the category Best Contemporary (R&R) Group Performance, Vocal Or Instrumental. In 2008, the song was inducted into the Grammy Hall of Fame.

The song was performed at the Monterey International Pop Festival in 1967. The performance was filmed for the movie of the festival, but not included in the final print.

== Charts ==
=== Weekly charts ===
Chart (1966)	Peak position
Australia	4
Canada RPM Top Singles	1
Ireland (IRMA)	4
New Zealand (Listener)	4
South Africa (Springbok Radio)	1
Italy (Musica e Dischi)	39
UK (The Official Charts Company)	3
US Billboard Hot 100	1
US Cash Box Top 100	1

=== Year-end charts ===
Chart (1966)	Rank
UK	35
US Billboard Hot 100	7
US Cash Box Top 100	31

== Certifications ==
Region	Certification	Certified units/sales
United Kingdom (BPI) Sales since 2005	Silver	200,000^{‡}
United States (RIAA)	Platinum	1,000,000^{‡}
^{‡} Sales+streaming figures based on certification alone.

== Cover versions ==
- Petula Clark, on the album I Couldn't Live Without Your Love (1966)
- The Beau Brummels, on the album Beau Brummels '66 (1966)
- Neil Diamond, on the album The Feel of Neil Diamond (1966)
- Jay and the Americans, on the album Livin' Above Your Head (1966)
- Sérgio Mendes, on the album The Great Arrival (1966)
- Marianne Faithfull, on the album Faithfull Forever (1966)
- Mrs. Miller, on the album Will Success Spoil Mrs Miller?! (1966)
- Los Darts "Donde Donde", a Spanish version on the album Los Darts (1966)
- Dee Dee Warwick, B-side on the single of "I'll Be Better Off (Without You)" (1968)
- Lenny Breau, on the album Guitar Sounds from Lenny Breau (1968)
- Herb Alpert and the Tijuana Brass, on the album The Beat of the Brass (1968)
- Ed Ames, on the album Who Will Answer? and Other Songs of Our Time (1968)
- Circus, on the album Circus (1969)
- The Cowsills, on the album The Cowsills in Concert (1969) and on a 1969 appearance on The Johnny Cash Show
- The 5th Dimension, on the album The 5th Dimension/Live!! (1971)
- Dionne Warwick, a previously unreleased recording on the album Only Love Can Break A Heart (1977)
- Galenskaparna och After Shave, Swedish parodic text "Bandy, Bandy" about bandy (1988)
- The Adventures, on the album Lions and Tigers and Bears (1993)
- Hear'Say, on the album Popstars (2001)
- Wilson Phillips three times: a modern rock take on the album California (2004), an a cappella single version the same year, and a straightforward take paying tribute to the original on the album Dedicated (2012)
- Matthew Sweet and Susanna Hoffs, on the album Under the Covers, Vol. 1 (2006)
- Rick Price and Jack Jones, on the album California Dreaming (2017)
- Duane Eddy, instrumental version on the album The Biggest Twang of Them All (1966)

== In popular culture ==
- ESPN announcer Chris Berman has referred to Rick Monday as "Monday, Monday".
- The Mamas and the Papas' original version of "Monday, Monday" is heard in a chase scene in the 2010 movie The Other Guys.
- The song is used in one of the Discovery Channel's promos for the reality TV series Dirty Jobs, which ran for eight seasons.
- The Daredevil villain, Typhoid Mary, sings this song when in her "Typhoid" personality.
- ESPN uses the Mamas and the Papas' version in a 2017 TV commercial to promote Monday Night Football.
- The song appears on the soundtrack of Michael Apted's 1974 film Stardust.
