= Words of Love (The Mamas & the Papas song) =

- West German picture sleeve

Single by the Mamas & the Papas

from the album The Mamas & the Papas
- B-side: "Dancing in the Street"
- Released: November 14, 1966
- Genre: Psychedelic rock; folk rock
- Length: 2:13
- Label: Dunhill
- Songwriter: John Phillips
- Producer: Lou Adler

The Mamas & the Papas singles chronology
"Look Through My Window" (1966)	"Words of Love" (1966)	"Dedicated to the One I Love" (1967)

"Words of Love" is a song by the Mamas & the Papas from their second studio album of the same name. The song was written by John Phillips, and featured Cass Elliot as the primary vocalist. It was released as a single in November 1966 (backed with a cover of Martha and the Vandellas's "Dancing in the Street").

Given the disappointing chart placement of the prior single, "Look Through My Window", hopes were high that "Words of Love" would return the group to the upper reaches of the charts: on the week of January 21, 1967, the single fulfilled this hope, as it reached No. 5 in the United States. Overseas, it peaked at No. 47 in the United Kingdom.

In the lyrics, Elliot advises men that simply reciting words of love "won't win a girl's heart anymore". She tells men to demonstrate their love and admiration for a potential girlfriend by sending her "somewhere where she's never been before". Michelle Phillips provided her high pitched "NO" before the refrain of the song.

The mono single, while approximately the same running time as the stereo version, contains a horn section overdub not heard in the stereo mix, extra backing vocals, and a more prominent piano; Elliot's vocals fade out a bit sooner near the end.

Cash Box praised the single's "solid and unique harmonies".

The Mamas & the Papas used "Dancing in the Street" in their live performances, and this flip side garnered enough airplay on its own accord to reach No. 73 on the Billboard Pop Chart.

== Later uses ==
In 1971, Mama Cass featured "Words of Love" as the B-side of one of her UK single releases, "One Way Ticket." This inclusion provided "Words of Love" with additional exposure in Britain, given its relatively tepid chart showing five years earlier.

== Charts ==
Chart performance for "Words of Love" by The Mamas & the Papas
Chart (1966/1967)	Peak position
Australia (Go-Set)	5
Canada (RPM Top 100)	3
UK Singles Chart	47
US Billboard Hot 100	5

== Cover versions ==
- In 2008, Nicole Atkins did a cover for an exclusive Barnes & Noble three track promotional sampler CD "Introducing Nicole Atkins" in conjunction with her appearance for their "Upstairs at the Square" series held in Manhattan.

== In popular culture ==
- The song was used frequently as bumper music during the early years of Coast to Coast AM.
- The song was featured as the outro to the eighth episode of the sixth season of Mad Men.
