= Creeque Alley =

1967 single by the Mamas & the Papas

- West German picture sleeve

Single by the Mamas & the Papas

from the album The Mamas & The Papas Deliver
- B-side: "Did You Ever Want to Cry"
- Released: April 1967
- Recorded: Late 1966
- Studio: Western Recorders, Hollywood, California
- Genre: Folk pop; sunshine pop
- Length: 3:45
- Label: Dunhill
- Songwriters: John Phillips, Michelle Phillips
- Producer: Lou Adler

The Mamas & the Papas singles chronology
"Dedicated to the One I Love" (1967)	"Creeque Alley" (1967)	"Twelve Thirty (Young Girls Are Coming to the Canyon)" (1967)

"Creeque Alley" is an autobiographical hit single written by John Phillips and Michelle Phillips of the Mamas and the Papas in late 1966, narrating the story of how the group was formed, and its early years. The third song on the album Deliver, it peaked at number 5 on the US Billboard pop singles chart the week of Memorial Day 1967, becoming their last Top 10 hit. It made number 9 on the UK Singles Chart, and number 4 on the Australian and number 1 on the Canadian charts.

== Background ==
The title of the song, which does not occur in the lyrics, is derived from Creque or Crequi (pronounced "creaky") Alley, home to a club in the Virgin Islands where the New Journeymen, John and Michelle Phillips' original group, spent time on vacation. The lyric "Greasin' on American Express cards" refers to that time, during which they could only make ends meet by using their credit cards, and the lyric "Duffy's good vibrations, and our imaginations, can't go on indefinitely" refers to Hugh Duffy, the owner of the club on Creeque Alley; Duffy later owned Chez Shack in Vieques, Puerto Rico.

The Phillips' lyrics mention, directly or indirectly, many artists and bands who were part of the folk music scene at the time, including fellow band members Cass Elliot and Denny Doherty, Zal Yanovsky and John Sebastian of the Lovin' Spoonful, Roger McGuinn of the Byrds, and Barry McGuire of the New Christy Minstrels (the group had previously provided backing vocals for McGuire, including on the first recorded version of "California Dreamin'). Several locations important to the band's story are mentioned, such as the Night Owl Cafe in Greenwich Village. Michelle Phillips is referred to in the lyrics by her nickname Michi ("John and Michi were getting kind of itchy, just to leave the folk music behind"). John Phillips said that he wrote the song to tell their producer Lou Adler "who was who" in the band's history.

The line that ends the first three verses is "And no one's getting fat, except Mama Cass." Michelle Phillips recalls being initially unwilling to sing the line, thinking it was too insensitive to Cass's weight, only to be surprised when Cass heard it a few minutes later, laughed and said "Oh God, that is so funny. I love it, that’s a great lyric." In the fourth verse, with the story of the genesis of the Mamas and the Papas nearing its denouement, Phillips changes the concluding line to "And everybody's getting fat except Mama Cass", with the word "fat" assuming the meaning of prosperous, alluding to the notion that the successes recently achieved by Cass' professional associates and friends had still eluded her. (During that Virgin Islands vacation, Cass became the last member to join the group when they were still known as the New Journeymen; the name change followed soon afterward.) The final line, "And California dreamin' is becoming a reality" is a reference to their hit song "California Dreamin'", and marks the point at which the group achieved its breakthrough, leaving behind the lifestyle described in the rest of the song.

== Reception ==
Cash Box called the single a "driving, pulsing, groovin’ ditty." Record World called it "infectious."

== Chart history ==
=== Weekly charts ===
Weekly chart performance for "Creeque Alley"
Chart (1967)	Peak position
Australia (Go-Set)	4
Canada RPM Top Singles	1
Ireland (IRMA)	14
New Zealand (Listener)	16
South Africa (Springbok)	19
UK	9
US Billboard Hot 100	5
US Cash Box Top 100	5

=== Year-end charts ===
Year-end chart performance for "Creeque Alley"
Chart (1967)	Position
Canada	74
US (Joel Whitburn's Pop Annual)	60
US Cash Box	88
