= Denny Doherty =

Canadian singer and musician (1940–2007)

- Doherty in a publicity photo, c. 1967
- Born: Dennis Gerrard Stephen Doherty; November 29, 1940; Halifax, Nova Scotia, Canada
- Died: January 19, 2007 (aged 66); Mississauga, Ontario, Canada
- Resting place: Gate of Heaven Cemetery, Lower Sackville, Nova Scotia, Canada
- Occupations: Singer; songwriter; actor; musician
- Years active: 1956–2006
- Spouse: Jeanette Doherty (m. 1978; died 1998)
- Children: 3
- Musical career
- Genres: Folk; pop
- Instruments: Vocals; guitar
- Label: Dunhill

Dennis Gerrard Stephen Doherty (November 29, 1940 – January 19, 2007) was a Canadian singer, songwriter, actor, and musician. A tenor, he was a founding member of the 1960s musical group the Mamas & the Papas for which he was inducted into the Rock and Roll Hall of Fame in 1998.

== Early life ==
Denny Doherty was born in Halifax, Nova Scotia, on November 29, 1940, the youngest of five children. He grew up in Halifax's North End in a devout Roman Catholic household. His father was a dockworker and Doherty has described his mother as "a housewife and mystic".

== Career ==
=== Early career ===
Doherty and three friends, Richard Sheehan, Eddie Thibodeau, and Mike O'Connell, began their musical career in 1956 with a band called the Hepsters. Two years later they disbanded. In 1960, still in Halifax, Doherty, aged 19, along with Pat LaCroix and Richard Byrne, began a folk group, called the Colonials.

Columbia Records signed the group several months later, at which time they changed their name to the Halifax III. The band recorded two LPs and had a minor hit titled "The Man Who Wouldn't Sing Along With Mitch", but broke up in 1965.

=== The Mamas and the Papas ===
In 1963, Doherty established a friendship with Cass Elliot when she was with a band called the Big 3. While on tour with the Halifax III, Doherty met John Phillips and his wife, model Michelle Gilliam.

A few months later, the Halifax III dissolved, and Doherty and their accompanist, Zal Yanovsky, were left broke in Hollywood. Elliot convinced her manager to hire them. Thus, Doherty and Yanovsky joined the Big 3 (increasing the number of members to four). Soon, after adding even more band members, they changed their name to the Mugwumps, which soon broke up due to insolvency. Yanovsky went on to form the Lovin' Spoonful with John Sebastian.

About this time, Phillips's new band, the New Journeymen, needed a replacement for tenor Marshall Brickman, who had left the group to pursue a career in television writing. Doherty, then unemployed, filled the opening. After the New Journeymen called it quits as a band in early 1965, Elliot was invited into the formation of a new band, which became the Magic Cyrcle. Six months later in September 1965, the group signed a recording contract with Dunhill Records. Changing their name to the Mamas and the Papas, the band soon began to record their debut album, If You Can Believe Your Eyes and Ears. The Mamas and the Papas song "Creeque Alley" briefly outlines this history. Doherty sang lead on "California Dreamin'" released in December 1965 prior to the release of the debut album early in 1966.

==== Relationship with Michelle Phillips ====
In late 1965, Doherty and Michelle Phillips started an affair. They were able to keep it secret during the early days of the band's success. When the affair was discovered, John and Michelle moved to their own residence (they had been sharing a house with Doherty), and the band continued recording together. Eventually the group signed a statement in June 1966 with their record label's full support, firing Michelle from the band. She was quickly replaced by Jill Gibson, girlfriend of the band's producer Lou Adler. Gibson's stint as a "Mama" lasted two and a half months.

Due to fan demand, Michelle was allowed to rejoin in August 1966, while Gibson was given a lump sum for her efforts. The band completed their second album (titled simply The Mamas and the Papas) by re-recording, replacing, or overlaying new vocal parts by Michelle Phillips over Jill Gibson's studio vocals.

After a string of hit singles, many television appearances, a successful third studio album (The Mamas and the Papas Deliver in March 1967), and the group's appearance at the Monterey International Pop Festival (which had been organized by John Phillips and Lou Adler) in June 1967, an ill-fated trip to England in October 1967 fragmented the already damaged group dynamic. Elliot quit after a stinging insult from John Phillips (although she returned to complete her parts for the group's fourth album, The Papas and the Mamas, which was not released until May 1968). By then, Michelle had given birth to Chynna Phillips (in February 1968) and a formal statement had been released announcing the group's demise.

=== Solo career ===
Elliot and Doherty remained friends after the band's break-up, while Elliot had a hit solo show. She eventually asked Doherty to marry her, but he declined. He released a few solo LPs and singles during this period, two of note being 1971's Watcha Gonna Do? and 1974's Waiting for a Song, the latter of which went unreleased in the United States. Featuring both Michelle Phillips and Cass Elliot on background vocals, the recordings would be Elliot's last, as she died of heart failure in her sleep on July 29, 1974, after a sold-out run in London a few months after the record was finished. Doherty was stunned and saddened and attended the funeral, along with John and Michelle Phillips.

In 1982, he joined a reconstituted Mamas & Papas, consisting of John, his daughter Mackenzie Phillips, and Elaine "Spanky" McFarlane, which toured and performed old standards and new tunes written by John. Doherty later produced an off-Broadway show called Dream a Little Dream, which was a narrative of his perspective of the story of the Mamas & the Papas. It was well received and garnered favourable reviews. The show was in part a response to John's PBS documentary Straight Shooter: The True Story of John Phillips and The Mamas and the Papas. It featured music from the group and focused on his relationship with Cass Elliot.

From 1993 to 2001, he played the part of the Harbour Master, as well as the voice-overs of the characters, in Theodore Tugboat, a CBC Television children's show chronicling the "lives" of vessels in a busy harbour loosely based upon Halifax Harbour.

In 1999, he played Charley McGinnis in 22 episodes of the CBC Television series Pit Pony.

In 2004, Doherty appeared on Sharon, Lois & Bram's 25th Anniversary Concert special, 25 Years of Skinnamarink, that aired on CBC on January 1, 2004. He sang two songs with the trio: "California Dreamin'" and "Who Put the Bomp?"

One of his last appearances was in the Canadian TV series Trailer Park Boys, Season 7 Episode 10 (season finale) as FBI Special Agent Ryan Shockneck. Filming was completed just shortly before his death in early 2007 and the end credits dedicate the episode to him.

== Personal life and death ==
Doherty had three children: a daughter from a brief first marriage, and a daughter and son, John, by his 20-year marriage to his second wife, Jeannette, who died in 1998 from ovarian cancer. John Doherty is in the Canadian ska punk band illScarlett.

=== Death ===
Doherty died on January 19, 2007, aged 66, at his home in Mississauga, Ontario. The cause was not immediately known, but he had suffered from kidney failure following surgery for an abdominal aortic aneurysm. His funeral service was held at St Stephen's Roman Catholic Church in Halifax. He was interred at the Gate of Heaven Cemetery in Lower Sackville, Nova Scotia.

== Other media ==
Shortly after his death, a documentary about his life was released titled Here I Am. The title song was written by blues guitarist James Anthony.

== Discography ==
| Single | Year | Adult Contemporary (chart) |
|---|---|---|
| "Watcha Gonna Do" / "Gathering the Words" | 1971 | - |
| "To Claudia on Thursday" / "Tuesday Morning" | 1971 | - |
| "Indian Girl" / "Baby Catch the Moon" | 1973 | - |
| "My Song" / "Indian Girl" | 1973 | - |
| "You'll Never Know" / "Good Night and Good Morning" | 1974 | #13 |
| "Simone" / "Simone" | 1976 | - |

"-" indicates did not chart in that territory

| Album | Year |
|---|---|
| Watcha Gonna Do? | 1971 |
| Waiting for a Song | 1974 |

== Filmography ==
| Year | Title | Role | Notes |
|---|---|---|---|
| 1984 | Windows | Billy Cooper | |
| 1992 | Hurt Penguins | Bilbo Roberts | |
| 1992 | Oh, What a Night | Harold | |
| 1993–2001 | Theodore Tugboat | Harbourmaster, Narrator | All episodes |
| 1997 | Elvis Meets Nixon | Vernon | |
| 1997 | Pit Pony | Charley McGinnis | Television film |
| 1998 | The Real Howard Spitz | Balthazar Mishkin | |
| 1999–2000 | Pit Pony | Charley McGinnis | 22 episodes |
| 2001 | Prince Charming | Jeweller | Television film |
| 2004 | 25 Years of Skinnamarink | Denny | |
| 2005 | This Is Wonderland | | Season 3, Episode 4 |
| 2007 | Trailer Park Boys | Ryan Shockneck | Episode: "A Sh** River Runs Through It"; Final role |

== See also ==
- Canadian rock
- Music of Canada
