= List of songs written by Barry Mann and Cynthia Weil =

This is a list of songs written by Barry Mann and Cynthia Weil, in most cases as a songwriting duo. The pair have also collaborated with other songwriters. Both Mann and Weil have also written chart hit songs as individuals with other writers, and Mann has written on his own.

== Chart hits and other notable songs written by Mann and Weil ==
Year	Song	Original artist	^{U.S. Pop}	^{U.S. R&B}	^{UK Singles Chart}	Other charting versions, and notes
1961	"Bless You"	Tony Orlando	15	—	5	
1962	"A Girl Has To Know"	The G-Clefs	81	—	—	
1962	"If a Woman Answers (Hang Up the Phone)"	Leroy Van Dyke	35	—	—	No. 3 Country
1962	"Uptown"	The Crystals	13	18	—	
1962	"Conscience"	James Darren	11	—	30	
1962	"Where Have You Been All My Life"	Arthur Alexander	58	—	—	
1962	"Johnny Loves Me"	Shelley Fabares	21	—	—	
1962	"Mary's Little Lamb"	James Darren	39	—	—	
1962	"My Dad"	Paul Petersen	6	19	—	
1962	"He's Sure the Boy I Love"	The Crystals	11	18	—	
1962	"Teenage Has-Been"	Barry Mann	—	—	—	Written by Barry Mann, Cynthia Weil and Gerry Goffin
1963	"Proud"	Johnny Crawford	29	—	—	
1963	"Blame It on the Bossa Nova"	Eydie Gorme	7	16	32	
1963	"Don't Be Afraid, Little Darlin'"	Steve Lawrence	26	—	—	
1963	"On Broadway"	The Drifters	9	7	—	Written by Barry Mann, Cynthia Weil, Jerry Leiber and Mike Stoller; 1978: George Benson, No. 7 US, No. 2 R&B
1963	"Amy"	Paul Petersen	65	—	—	
1963	"Heart"	Kenny Chandler	64	—	—	1963: Wayne Newton, No. 82 US; 1966: Rita Pavone, No. 27 UK
1963	"Don't Make My Baby Blue"	Frankie Laine	51	—	—	1965: The Shadows, No. 10 UK
1963	"I'm Gonna Be Strong"	Frankie Laine	—	—	—	1964: Gene Pitney, No. 9 US, No. 2 UK; 1995: Cyndi Lauper, No. 37 UK
1963	"Only in America"	Jay and the Americans	25	—	—	Written by Barry Mann, Cynthia Weil, Jerry Leiber and Mike Stoller
1963	"Cindy's Gonna Cry"	Johnny Crawford	72	—	—	
1963	"I'll Take You Home"	The Drifters	25	24	37	1965: Cliff Bennett and the Rebel Rousers, No. 42 UK
1963	"The Girl Sang the Blues"	The Everly Brothers	—	—	25	
1964	"I Want You to Meet My Baby "	Eydie Gorme	17	—	—	
1964	"Walking in The Rain"	The Ronettes	23	3	—	Written by Barry Mann, Cynthia Weil and Phil Spector; 1967: The Walker Brothers, No. 26 UK; 1969: Jay and the Americans, No. 19 US; 1973: The Partridge Family, No. 10 UK
1964	"You Baby"	The Ronettes	—	—	—	Written by Barry Mann, Cynthia Weil and Phil Spector; 1975: John Holt, No. 53 UK
1964	"Saturday Night at the Movies"	The Drifters	18	8	—	1972: The Drifters, No. 3 UK (reissue); 1996: Robson & Jerome, No. 1 UK
1964	"Talk To Me Baby"	Barry Mann	94	—	—	
1964	"You've Lost That Lovin' Feelin'"	The Righteous Brothers	1	2	1	Written by Barry Mann, Cynthia Weil and Phil Spector; 1965: Cilla Black, No. 2 UK; 1969: The Righteous Brothers, No. 10 UK (reissue); 1969: Dionne Warwick, No. 16 US, No. 13 R&B; 1971: Roberta Flack & Donny Hathaway, No. 71 US; 1977: The Righteous Brothers, No. 42 UK (reissue); 1979: Long John Baldry, No. 89 US; 1980: Hall & Oates, No. 12 US, No. 55 UK; 1988: The Righteous Brothers, No. 87 UK (reissue); 1990: The Righteous Brothers, No. 3 UK (reissue)
1965	"Born To Be Together"	The Ronettes	52	—	—	Written by Barry Mann, Cynthia Weil and Phil Spector
1965	"Come On Over To My Place"	The Drifters	60	—	40	1972: The Drifters, No. 9 UK (reissue)
1965	"See That Girl"	The Righteous Brothers	—	—	—	from the 1965 LP Just Once in My Life
1965	"Love Her"	The Walker Brothers	—	—	20	
1965	"Looking Through the Eyes of Love"	Gene Pitney	28	—	3	1972: The Partridge Family, No. 39 US, No. 9 UK
1965	"It's Gonna Be Fine"	Glenn Yarbrough	54	—	—	
1965	"We Gotta Get out of This Place"	The Animals	13	—	2	1980: Angelic Upstarts, No. 65 UK; 1990: The Animals, No. 85 UK (reissue)
1965	"Home of the Brave"	Bonnie & the Treasures	77	—	—	1965: Jody Miller, No. 25 US
1965	"Magic Town"	Jody Miller	—	—	—	1966: The Vogues, No. 21 US
1966	"(You're My) Soul and Inspiration"	The Righteous Brothers	1	13	15	1977: Donny and Marie Osmond, No. 38 US
1966	"Kicks"	Paul Revere & the Raiders	4	—	—	
1966	"Hungry"	Paul Revere & the Raiders	6	—	—	
1966	"Angelica"	Barry Mann	—	—	—	1970: Oliver, No. 97 US
1966	"How Can I Tell Her It's Over"	Andy Williams	—	—	—	
1966	"It's Not Easy"	Normie Rowe	—	—	—	1968: The Will-O-Bees, No. 95 US
1966	"Shades of Gray"	The Will-O-Bees	—	—	—	1967: The Monkees, on the album Headquarters
1967	"It's A Happening World"	The Tokens	69	—	—	
1967	"Good Good Lovin'"	The Blossoms	—	45	—	
1968	"Brown Eyed Woman"	Bill Medley	43	37	—	
1968	"Shape of Things to Come"	Max Frost and the Troopers	22	—	—	
1968	"Peace Brother Peace"	Bill Medley	48	—	—	
1968	"Make Your Own Kind of Music"	The Will-O-Bees	—	—	—	1969: Mama Cass, No. 36 US; 1972: Barbra Streisand, No. 92 US
1968	"It's Getting Better"	The Vogues	—	—	—	1969: Mama Cass, No. 30 US, No. 8 UK
1969	"Just a Little Lovin'"	Dusty Springfield	—	—	—	Opening track on the 1969 LP Dusty in Memphis
1969	"I Just Can't Help Believing"	Bobby Vee	—	—	—	1970: B. J. Thomas, No. 9 US; 1971: Elvis Presley, No. 6 UK; 1983: Boys Town Gang, No. 82 UK
1970	"New World Coming"	Cass Elliot	42	—	—	
1970	"Feelings"	Barry Mann	93	—	—	
1970	"I Really Want to Know You"	The Partridge Family	—	—	—	from the 1970 LP The Partridge Family Album (performed by The Love Generation)
1970	"I'm on the Road"	The Partridge Family	—	—	—	from the 1970 LP The Partridge Family Album (performed by The Love Generation)
1972	"Rock and Roll Lullaby"	B. J. Thomas	15	—	—	
1972	"So Long Dixie"	Blood Sweat & Tears	44	—	—	
1974	"Nobody But You"	Barry Mann	—	—	—	1977: John Edwards, No. 85 R&B; 1977: Gladys Knight & The Pips, No. 34 UK
1974	"We're Over"	Johnny Rodriguez	—	—	—	No. 3 Country
1975	"Mamacita"	The Grass Roots	71	—	—	
1976	"The Princess and the Punk"	Barry Mann	78	—	—	
1977	"Here You Come Again"	B. J. Thomas	—	—	—	1977: Dolly Parton, No. 3 US, No. 1 Country, No. 75 UK
1981	"Don't Know Much"	Bill Medley	88	—	—	1989: Linda Ronstadt and Aaron Neville, No. 2 US, No. 2 UK
1981	"Just Once"	Quincy Jones featuring James Ingram	17	11	76	
1982	"Right Here and Now"	Bill Medley	58	—	—	
1982	"Never Gonna Let You Go"	Dionne Warwick	—	—	—	1983: Sergio Mendes, No. 4 US, No. 28 R&B
1983	"All I Need To Know"	Bette Midler	77	—	—	Written by Barry Mann, Cynthia Weil and Tom Snow
1984	"Black Butterfly"	Deniece Williams	—	22	—	
1984	"We're Going All the Way"	Jeffrey Osborne	48	16	—	
1984	"Use Me"	George Benson	—	—	—	Written by Barry Mann, Cynthia Weil and James Ingram
1984	"Late At Night"	George Benson	—	—	86	
1984	"Olympia"	Sergio Mendes	58	—	—	
1984	"The Last Time I Made Love"	Joyce Kennedy & Jeffrey Osborne	40	2	—	Written by Barry Mann, Cynthia Weil and Jeff Barry
1985	"Baby Come And Get It"	The Pointer Sisters	44	24	76	Written by Barry Mann, Cynthia Weil and James Ingram
1985	"It's Your Night"	James Ingram	—	—	82	Written by Barry Mann, Cynthia Weil and James Ingram
1986	"Somewhere Out There"	Linda Ronstadt & James Ingram	2	—	8	Written by Barry Mann, Cynthia Weil and James Horner for the movie, An American Tail – a double Grammy Award winner
1991	"Closer Than Close"	Peabo Bryson	—	10	—	
1992	"Lost In The Night"	Peabo Bryson	—	43	—	Written by Barry Mann, Cynthia Weil and Hans Zimmer, based on the movie, Days of Thunder
1993	"None of Us Are Free"	Ray Charles	—	—	—	Written by Barry Mann, Cynthia Weil and Brenda Russell
1997	"I Will Come to You"	Hanson	9	—	5	Written by Barry Mann, Cynthia Weil, Isaac Hanson, Taylor Hanson, and Zac Hanson
1978	(loving you is so easy)	winter				written by Barry Mann and Cynthia Weil

== Chart hits and other notable songs written by Barry Mann with others or alone ==
Year	Song	Original artist	^{U.S. Pop}	^{U.S. R&B}	^{UK Singles Chart}	Other charting versions, and notes
1959	"She Say (Oom Dooby Doom)"	The Diamonds	18	—	—	Written by Barry Mann and Mike Anthony
1959	"Don't Destroy Me"	Billy "Crash" Craddock	94	—	—	Written by Barry Mann and Joe Shapiro
1960	"Footsteps"	Steve Lawrence	7	—	4	Written by Barry Mann and Hank Hunter; 1960: Ronnie Carroll, No. 36 UK; 1981: Showaddywaddy, No. 31 UK
1960	"The Way of a Clown"	Teddy Randazzo	44	—	—	Written by Barry Mann and Howard Greenfield
1960	"Girls Girls Girls"	Steve Lawrence	—	—	49	Written by Barry Mann and Howard Greenfield
1960	"Come Back Silly Girl"	Steve Lawrence	—	—	—	Written by Barry Mann; 1962: The Lettermen, No. 17 US
1960	"Counting Teardrops"	Barry Mann	—	—	—	Written by Barry Mann and Howard Greenfield; 1960: Emile Ford & the Checkmates, No. 4 UK
1960	"Warpaint"	Barry Mann	—	—	—	Written by Barry Mann and Howard Greenfield; 1961: The Brook Brothers, No. 5 UK
1961	"Who Put the Bomp (in the Bomp, Bomp, Bomp)"	Barry Mann	7	—	—	Written by Barry Mann and Gerry Goffin; 1961: The Viscounts, No. 21 UK; 1982: Showaddywaddy, No. 37 UK
1961	"Sweet Little You"	Neil Sedaka	59	—	—	Written by Barry Mann and Larry Kolber
1961	"I Love How You Love Me"	The Paris Sisters	5	—	—	Written by Barry Mann and Larry Kolber; 1961: Jimmy Crawford, No. 18 UK; 1964: Maureen Evans, No. 34 UK; 1966: Paul & Barry Ryan, No. 21 UK; 1968: Bobby Vinton, No. 9 US
1961	"I Could Have Loved You So Well"	Ray Peterson	57	—	—	Written by Barry Mann and Gerry Goffin
1962	"Let Me Be the One"	The Paris Sisters	87	—	—	Written by Barry Mann and Larry Kolber; 1969: Peaches and Herb, No. 74 US, No. 40 R&B
1962	"I'll Never Dance Again"	Bobby Rydell	14	—	—	Written by Barry Mann and Mike Anthony
1962	"Patches"	Dickey Lee	6	10	—	Written by Barry Mann and Larry Kolber
1963	"The Grass Is Greener"	Brenda Lee	17	—	—	Written by Barry Mann and Mike Anthony
1968	"Something Better"	Marianne Faithfull	—	—	—	Written by Barry Mann and Gerry Goffin
1970	"When You Get Right Down to It"	The Delfonics	53	12	—	Written by Barry Mann; 1971: Ronnie Dyson, No. 94 US, No. 37 R&B, No. 34 UK
1977	"How Much Love"	Leo Sayer	17	—	10	Written by Barry Mann and Leo Sayer
1977	"Sometimes When We Touch"	Dan Hill	3	—	13	Written by Barry Mann and Dan Hill; 1997: Newton, UK No. 32
1978	"Let the Song Last Forever"	Dan Hill	91	—	—	Written by Barry Mann and Dan Hill
1984	"There's No Easy Way"	James Ingram	58	14	—	Written by Barry Mann
1988	"Love Is on Our Side Again"	Julio Iglesias	—	—	81	Written by Barry Mann and Jim Sullins
1992	"Never Saw a Miracle"	Curtis Stigers	107	5 (AC)	34	Written by Barry Mann and Curtis Stigers

== Chart hits and other notable songs written by Cynthia Weil with others ==
Year	Song	Original artist	^{U.S. Pop}	^{U.S. R&B}	^{UK Singles Chart}	Other charting versions, and notes
1961	"Happy Times (Are Here to Stay)"	Tony Orlando	82	—	—	Written by Gerry Goffin, Carole King and Cynthia Weil
1980	"He's So Shy"	The Pointer Sisters	3	10	—	Written by Cynthia Weil and Tom Snow
1981	"Somewhere Down the Road"	Barry Manilow	21	—	—	Written by Cynthia Weil and Tom Snow
1981	"Come What May"	(airsupply)	—	—	—	music Tom Snow, lyrics Cynthia Weil
1982	"One to One"	Carole King	45	—	—	Written by Carole King and Cynthia Weil
1983	"Running with the Night"	Lionel Richie	7	6	9	Written by Lionel Richie and Cynthia Weil
1984	"If Ever You're in My Arms Again"	Peabo Bryson	10	6	—	Written by Cynthia Weil, Michael Masser and Tom Snow
1984	"All of You"	Julio Iglesias and Diana Ross	19	38	43	Written by Cynthia Weil and Tony Renis
1985	"Through the Fire"	Chaka Khan	60	15	77	Written by Cynthia Weil, David Foster and Tom Keane; 2003: Kanye West, "Through the Wire", US No. 15, R&B No. 8, UK No. 9 Written by Weil, Foster, Keane, and Kanye West
1985	"Love Theme from St. Elmo's Fire (For Just a Moment)"	Amy Holland and Donny Gerrard	—	—	—	Written by Cynthia Weil and David Foster
1985	"Love Always Finds a Way"	Peabo Bryson	—	63	—	Written by Cynthia Weil and Tom Snow
1986	"So Far So Good"	Sheena Easton	43	—	—	Written by Cynthia Weil and Tom Snow
1986	"Love Will Conquer All"	Lionel Richie	9	2	45	Written by Cynthia Weil, Greg Phillinganes and Lionel Richie
1992	"Just for Tonight"	Vanessa Williams	26	11	—	Written by Cynthia Weil and Keith Thomas
1992	"Is There Something"	Christopher Cross	—	—	—	Written by Cynthia Weil, Cross, and Steve Dorff
1998	"Wrong Again"	Martina McBride	36	—	—	Written by Cynthia Weil and Tommy Lee James; No. 1 Country
