= Mama's Big Ones =

Compilation album by Cass Elliot
- Released: October 1970
- Recorded: 1966–1970
- Genre: Pop rock
- Label: Dunhill

Cass Elliot chronology
| Bubblegum, Lemonade, and... Something for Mama (1969) | Mama's Big Ones (1970) | Dave Mason & Cass Elliot (1971) |

Mama's Big Ones is a compilation album of mostly previously released material by Cass Elliot.

== Overview ==
Inaugurated in the spring of 1968, Elliot's solo tenure with Dunhill Records was contentious, the label insisting the onetime-member of the Mamas & Papas be billed as "Mama Cass", and that she record in the soft rock vein which had afforded the Mamas & Papas' success. She would claim in 1971 that, at Dunhill, she had been "forced to be so bubble gum that I'd stick to the floor when I walked." Elliot's solo singles were progressively less successful, Dunhill president Jay Lasker commenting after her sixth solo single stalled at #42 in early 1970: "'New World Coming' has gotten great airplay because it came along and expressed hope in the midst of despair. Unfortunately, it isn't selling all that well, so we're going back to an old theme. The message here – at least to us – is that 'the message record has had it'. [Now] Mama Cass is going to do love songs."

In July 1970, it was announced that Elliot would depart Dunhill for RCA Records, the compilation Mama's Big Ones being issued that October as the final album she owed to Dunhill. It featured eight of Elliot's nine Dunhill single releases, omitting 1968's "California Earthquake" and adding The Mamas & the Papas' hit "Words of Love", which featured Elliot as lead vocalist. Mama's Big Ones provided the album debut for the tracks "New World Coming", "A Song That Never Comes", "The Good Times Are Coming", "Don't Let the Good Life Pass You By", "One Way Ticket", and "Ain't Nobody Else Like You", all of which had been, or would be, single releases in the U.S. or U.K. (the last-named being the UK B-side of Elliot's version of "Easy Come, Easy Go").

== Reception ==
The album was released in October 1970 and peaked at #194 on the Billboard 200. It was reissued by MCA in both 1980 and—on CD—1987.

== Legacy ==
In the 1996 British film Beautiful Thing, the album can be seen hanging on the wall of the character Leah while she is listening to "One Way Ticket". "It’s Getting Better", "Make Your Own Kind of Music", "Dream a Little Dream of Me", and "Move in a Little Closer, Baby" are also featured in the film.

Songs from the album (namely "It’s Getting Better", "Make Your Own Kind of Music", and "New World Coming") were featured in the American television series Lost.

"Don't Let the Good Life Pass You By" appeared in, and provided the title for, the ninth episode of the third season of the NBC fantasy comedy The Good Place.

== Track listing ==
| No. | Title | Writer(s) | Chart Position | Length |
|---|---|---|---|---|
| 1. | "It's Getting Better" (from Bubblegum, Lemonade, &.... Something for Mama) | Barry Mann; Cynthia Weil | US #30 Pop/#13 AC, UK #8 (5/1969) | 2:57 |
| 2. | "Dream a Little Dream of Me" (with The Mamas & the Papas) (from The Papas & the Mamas) | Gus Kahn; Wilbur Schwandt; Fabian Andre | US #12 Pop/#2 AC, UK #11 (6/1968) | 3:13 |
| 3. | "Make Your Own Kind of Music" (from Make Your Own Kind of Music/It’s Getting Better) | Mann; Weil | US #36 Pop/#6 AC (10/1969) | 2:20 |
| 4. | "Words of Love" (with The Mamas & the Papas) (from The Mamas & the Papas) | John Phillips | US #5, UK #12 (11/1966) | 2:15 |
| 5. | "New World Coming" | Mann; Weil | US #42 Pop/#4 AC (1/1970) | 2:12 |
| 6. | "Move in a Little Closer, Baby" (from Bubblegum, Lemonade, &.... Something for Mama) | Robert O'Connor; Arnold Capitanelli | US #58 Pop/#32 AC (2/1969) | 2:38 |
| 7. | "One Way Ticket" | Stephen Lawrence; Bruce Hart | N/A | 2:48 |
| 8. | "The Good Times Are Coming" | John Barry; Hal David | US #104 Pop/#19 AC (11/1970) | 2:55 |
| 9. | "Easy Come, Easy Go" (from Bubblegum, Lemonade, &.... Something for Mama) | Jack Keller; Diane Hildebrand | N/A | 2:46 |
| 10. | "Don't Let the Good Life Pass You By" | Sharon Rucker | US #110 Pop/#34 AC (11/1970) | 2:49 |
| 11. | "Ain't Nobody Else Like You" | Sharon Rucker | N/A | 2:24 |
| 12. | "A Song That Never Comes" | Terry Cashman; Gene Pistilli; Tommy West | US #99 Pop/#25 AC (7/1970) | 2:28 |
