= Something Better =

Something Better may refer to:

- "Something Better" (Marianne Faithfull song), 1968 song
- "Something Better" (Softengine song), 2014 Finnish Eurovision entry
- "Something Better" (Audien song), a 2015 song featuring Lady Antebellum
- "Something Better", song from Natalie Imbruglia from album Left of the Middle written by Imbruglia, Boo Hewerdine, Thornalley
- "Something Better", single by Martin Solveig
- "Something Better" a single by Flyleaf from their 2013 EP Who We Are
- ”Something Better”, a song from the 1996 film ‘’Muppet Treasure Island’’
