= Bubblegum, Lemonade, and... Something for Mama =

Bubblegum, Lemonade &... Something for Mama

Studio album by Cass Elliot
- Released: June 1969
- Genre: Traditional pop; pop rock; psychedelic pop; sunshine pop
- Label: Dunhill
- Producer: Steve Barri

Cass Elliot chronology
Dream a Little Dream (1968)	Bubblegum, Lemonade &... Something for Mama (1969)	Mama's Big Ones (1970)

Bubblegum, Lemonade &... Something for Mama is the second solo album released by Cass Elliot under the billing "Mama Cass". It was recorded in 1969 and arranged and produced by Steve Barri. The album was originally released in June 1969 with 11 tracks, but was re-released in November 1969 with 12 tracks ("Make Your Own Kind of Music" had just become a hit and was added to the album), a modified track order, a different album cover, and the new title of Make Your Own Kind of Music/It’s Getting Better. Though primarily a "bubblegum" pop album, several other types of music are also represented, including country, tin pan alley, and jazz.

== Conception ==
The album came after of Elliot’s disastrous Caesars Palace show in October 1968, which was planned as a three-week engagement, but closed after a single performance, during which Elliot was ill. Plagued with bills, the studio executives at Dunhill took creative control and felt that the fastest and easiest solution would be to have Elliot record an album full of music similar to what she had done with The Mamas & the Papas. Steve Barri was appointed by Dunhill to arrange the album and choose the material.

== Reception ==
Professional ratings
Review scores
Source	Rating
AllMusic	link

On its initial release, the album was a moderate success, peaking at No. 91 on the Billboard Top LP's chart; the re-release peaked at No. 169 in December 1969. It included three successful singles, with "It's Getting Better" and "Make Your Own Kind of Music" both reaching the Top 40 of the Billboard Hot 100 ("Move in a Little Closer, Baby", originally recorded by British band Harmony Grass, peaked at #58).

== Legacy ==
The songs from the album remain among the most popular of Elliot’s solo career. Many of the songs were featured in the play and 1996 film Beautiful Thing. In the film, the album can be seen hanging on the wall of the character Leah.

"It’s Getting Better" and "Make Your Own Kind of Music" were both featured on the hit American television series Lost.

Bubblegum was re-released on CD in 2002 by MCA Japan with the original album cover and "Make Your Own Kind of Music" added on as a bonus track. The album was also released in 2005 as part of the compilation CD The Complete Cass Elliot Collection: 1968-71.

== Track listing ==
=== July 1969 ===
1. "It's Getting Better" (Barry Mann, Cynthia Weil) – 3:00
2. "Blow Me a Kiss" (Jack Carone) – 2:50
3. "Sour Grapes" (Tom Ghent) – 2:35
4. "Easy Come, Easy Go" (Diane Hildebrand, Jack Keller) – 2:45
5. "I Can Dream, Can't I" (Sammy Fain, Irving Kahal) – 2:35
6. "Welcome to the World" (Martin Siegel, Scott English) – 2:18
7. "Lady Love" (Delaney Bramlett) – 3:04
8. "He's a Runner" (Laura Nyro) – 3:38
9. "Move in a Little Closer, Baby" (Robert O'Connor, Arnold Capitanelli) – 2:38
10. "When I Just Wear My Smile" (Tom Lane, Sharyn Pulley) – 2:20
11. "Who's to Blame" (Leah Kunkel) – 2:55

=== December 1969 ===
1. "Make Your Own Kind of Music" (Barry Mann, Cynthia Weil) – 2:25
2. "Blow Me a Kiss" (Jack Carone)
3. "It's Getting Better" (Mann, Weil)
4. "Easy Come, Easy Go (Diane Hildebrand, Jack Keller)
5. "I Can Dream, Can't I" (Sammy Fain, Irving Kahal)
6. "Welcome to the World" (Martin Siegel, Scott English)
7. "Lady Love" (Delaney Bramlett)
8. "He's a Runner" (Laura Nyro)
9. "Move in a Little Closer, Baby" (Robert O'Connor, Arnold Capitanelli)
10. "When I Just Wear My Smile" (Tom Lane, Sharyn Pulley)
11. "Who's to Blame" (Leah Kunkel)
12. "Sour Grapes" (Tom Ghent)

== Personnel ==
- Mama Cass – vocals
- Mike Deasy – guitar
- Red Rhodes – steel guitar
- Hal Blaine – drums, percussion
- Steve Barri – percussion
- Ben Benay – guitar, harmonica
- Jimmie Haskell – accordion, arranger, conductor
- Phil Kaye – percussion, engineer
- Larry Knechtel – organ, piano
- Joe Osborn – bass

Technical

- Gary Burden – art direction, design
- Henry Diltz – photography

== Charts ==
Chart (1969)	Peak position
US Billboard 200	91
US Cashbox Top 100 Albums	82
