= Tony Rivers =

English singer (1940–2026)

Background information
- Born: Douglas Anthony Thompson; 21 December 1940; Shildon, County Durham, England
- Died: 30 March 2026 (aged 85) Selby, North Yorkshire, England
- Occupations: Singer, songwriter
- Years active: 1960–2020s
- Labels: EMI Records, Columbia Records, RCA Records
- Formerly of: Tony Rivers and The Castaways; Harmony Grass
- Website: www.tonyriversbook.com

Douglas Anthony Thompson (21 December 1940 – 30 March 2026), known professionally as Tony Rivers, was an English singer-songwriter, best known for singing with the groups Tony Rivers and the Castaways and Harmony Grass. Rivers sang on albums by Steve Harley & Cockney Rebel, Roger Daltrey, Shakin' Stevens and Cliff Richard, and on the theme song for the BBC TV series Whatever Happened to the Likely Lads?.

== Early life ==
Douglas Anthony Thompson was born in Shildon, County Durham on 21 December 1940. As a child, his family moved to East Ham. Rivers went to Raine's Foundation Grammar School for Boys in Arbour Square, Stepney. He took guitar lessons as a teenager, after hearing "That'll Be the Day" by Buddy Holly.

== Career ==
=== Tony Rivers and The Castaways ===
After working at Butlins' Holiday Camp in Clacton, he joined a group called 'The Cutaways' and they became 'Tony Rivers and the Castaways'. The band were supporting acts for the likes of The Beatles and The Rolling Stones. They recorded six singles for EMI and Columbia Records between 1963 and 1966, but the only hit the band had was with their cover of the Beach Boys' "God Only Knows", which made number 46 in the Melody Maker charts in August 1966; Columbia had been under the impression that the original would not be released as a single. According to Rivers, he had befriended the Beach Boys when they visited the UK in 1964, and was inspired to cover "God Only Knows" after the band played him their Pet Sounds album.

=== Harmony Grass ===
In 1968 the Castaways disbanded and Rivers formed Harmony Grass with former bandmates. Their single "Move in a Little Closer, Baby" reached No. 24 on the UK Singles Chart in January 1969. They released one album, This Is Us, on RCA, and gave concerts in the UK, including at London's Marquee Club. Rivers left to go solo in July/August 1970, and was replaced by Joe Williams, however by the end of the year Harmony Grass had disbanded.

=== Session work ===
He started to do session work and performed many cover versions on the Top of the Pops records. He recalled performing the vocals of Alvin Stardust, Donny Osmond, Johnny Rotten, and at one point having to replicate the vocal harmonies of "Bohemian Rhapsody" by Queen. Rivers later said of working on Top of the Pops records: "You had to do three songs in three hours, then you were out of there", and of having to imitate Johnny Rotten: "Johnny Rotten sounded like Norman Wisdom to me, so that’s how I did it."

Rivers' work with Cliff Richard came in the mid-1970s after he received a phone call from Bruce Welch, the rhythm guitarist for Richard's backing band The Shadows. He sang and arranged for and with Cliff Richard throughout the 1970s up to the late 1980s. He went on world tours and assisted with the production of recordings for Richard during that period, including arranging the harmonies and singing backing vocals on hits such as "Miss You Nights" and "Devil Woman".

He later worked on recordings and hits for musicians as diverse as Steve Harley, Shakin' Stevens, Sheena Easton, Soft Machine, UFO, Pink Floyd (The Final Cut), The Who and others. Rivers also appeared as a vocalist and/or composer on records released by Mike Hugg, Dan McCafferty, Jackie Wilson, Maxine Nightingale, Ralph McTell, Al Stewart, The Alan Parsons Project, Brian Bennett, Linda Lewis, Kirby Gregory, Tarney/Spencer Band, Bernie Marsden, Danny Kirwan, Bryn Haworth, Dana Rosemary Scallon, Partners in Crime, Strangeways, Jeff Beck, Nick Heyward, Roger Daltrey, Mark Wirtz, The Shadows, Graham Bonnet, Autumn, and Annie and the Caldwells.

He was the voice of West Ham United F.C. for their hit version of "I'm Forever Blowing Bubbles" and the voice leading the Whatever Happened to the Likely Lads? theme song.

Rivers sang backing vocals for Elton John when John performed at Live Aid in 1985.

Rivers sang on the 2005 Saint Etienne album Tales from Turnpike House, performing harmonies with his son Anthony Rivers. His autobiography, I'm Nearly Famous (The Tales of a Likely Lad), was published in 2019.

== Personal life and death ==
Rivers married his wife, Pat, in 1966, who died in 2019. They lived in Spain at some point.

Rivers suffered from Alzheimer's disease and moved into a care home in 2024. He developed sepsis in February 2026, and was transferred to hospital, where he died a month later died on 30 March 2026, aged 85.
