= The Cha-Cha-Cha =

Single by Bobby Rydell
- B-side: "The Best Man Cried"
- Released: 1962
- Genre: Pop
- Length: 2:29
- Label: Cameo Records
- Songwriters: Kal Mann & Dave Appell

Bobby Rydell singles chronology
"I'll Never Dance Again" (1962)	"The Cha-Cha-Cha" (1962)	"Butterfly Baby" (1963)

"The Cha-Cha-Cha" is a song released in 1962 by Bobby Rydell.

== Background ==
The song tells of the singer's desire to have his "baby" dance the Cha-Cha-Cha, while bemoaning the dance trends of the day (directly referencing the Twist, Wah-Watusi, Hully-Gully, Locomotion and Mashed Potatoes).

== Chart performance ==
The song spent 11 weeks on the Billboard Hot 100 chart, peaking at No. 10 on November 17, 1962, while reaching No. 1 in Hong Kong, No. 2 in Australia, and No. 11 on Canada's CHUM Hit Parade.

Chart (1962)	Peak position
US Billboard Hot 100	10
Hong Kong	1
Australia - Music Maker	2
Canada - CHUM Hit Parade	11

== Cover versions ==
In 1963 Dalida performed a French cover version, Le cha cha cha.
