= The Ugliest Girl in Town =

American sitcom

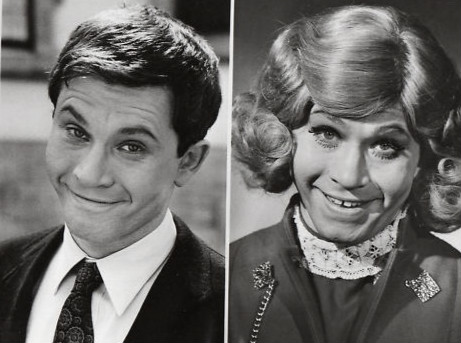
- Kastner as Timothy, left and as "Timmie", right.
- Created by: Robert Kaufman
- Starring: Peter Kastner; Patricia Brake; Gary Marshal; Jenny Till
- Theme music composer: Howard Greenfield; Helen Miller
- Opening theme: "The Ugliest Girl in Town", sung by The Will-O-Bees
- Composer: Shorty Rogers
- Countries of origin: United States (production); Great Britain (location)
- Original language: English
- No. of seasons: 1
- No. of episodes: 20 (3 unaired)

Production
- Executive producer: Harry Ackerman
- Producer: Jerry Davis
- Production locations: Filmed on location in London and at Shepperton Studios in Shepperton, Surrey, England
- Running time: 30 minutes
- Production company: Screen Gems

Original release
- Network: ABC
- Release: September 26, 1968 – January 30, 1969

The Ugliest Girl in Town is an American sitcom produced by Screen Gems for ABC. It ran from September 26, 1968, to January 30, 1969. It starred Peter Kastner as a man pretending to be a woman.

== Synopsis ==
Timothy Blair is a Hollywood talent agent. He falls in love with Julie Renfield, a British actress who is visiting the United States to do a movie. After the movie is finished, she returns to England. To help his brother Gene complete a photography assignment, Timothy dresses as a hippie and poses for a photo shoot. The photos are sent to a modeling agent in England who assumes they are of a woman. He offers "her" a job.

Knowing this would be his only chance to go to Great Britain and be with Julie, Timothy accepts and dubs himself "Timmie". Timothy has two weeks of vacation to spend as much time with Julie as he can, but when he is about to leave with his brother, Gene loses £11,000 gambling. This, coupled with the fact that the talent agent discovers the brothers' ruse and demands to recoup his investment, means Timothy has to continue being Timmie for a while longer.

== Production ==
Although the series was bought by ITV for British airings, it was never screened in the London area despite the series being both set and filmed there.

The series theme song, written by Howard Greenfield and Helen Miller and produced by Bill Traut, was recorded by New York City trio the Will-O-Bees and released as a single by SGC Records.

The series was also dubbed into Japanese and was broadcast on TBS Television under the title "おかしなおかしな女の子" (lit: The Strange, Strange Girl) and was broadcast from February 7, 1969 to June 20, 1969.

== Reviews ==
In 2002, TV Guide ranked the series number 18 on its "50 Worst TV Shows of All Time" list.

== Cast ==
- Peter Kastner – Timothy Blair
- Patricia Brake – Julie Renfield
- Gary Marshal – Gene Blair
- Jenny Till – Sandra Wolston
- Nicholas Parsons – David Courtney

== Episodes ==
| No. | Title | Directed by | Written by | Original release date |
|---|---|---|---|---|
| 1 | "The Ugliest Girl in Town" | James Frawley | Robert Kaufman | September 26, 1968 |
| 2 | "Visitors from a Strange Planet" | Unknown | Unknown | October 3, 1968 |
| 3 | "The Pain in Timmy's Tummy" | Unknown | Unknown | October 10, 1968 |
| 4 | "The Cover Up Girl" | Unknown | Unknown | October 17, 1968 |
| 5 | "One of Our Models Is Missing" | Unknown | Unknown | October 24, 1968 |
| 6 | "Up the Thames Without a Paddle" | Jerry Bernstein | Howard Leeds | October 31, 1968 |
| 7 | "The Perfect Young Lady" | Unknown | Unknown | November 7, 1968 |
| 8 | "The Look Alikes" | Unknown | Unknown | November 14, 1968 |
| 9 | "Timmy, the Mother" | Unknown | Unknown | November 21, 1968 |
| 10 | "Popped Star" | Unknown | Unknown | December 5, 1968 |
| 11 | "The Paris Incident" | E.W. Swackhamer | Brad Ashton | December 12, 1968 |
| 12 | "The Jewel Robbery" | Unknown | Unknown | December 19, 1968 |
| 13 | "My Sister, the Genius" | Ray Austin | Robert Kaufman | December 26, 1968 |
| 14 | "The Ugliest Boy in Town" | Unknown | Unknown | January 2, 1969 |
| 15 | "The Trouble with England" | Jerry Davis | Lila Garrett & Bernie Kahn | January 16, 1969 |
| 16 | "A Little Advice Goes a Long Way" | Jerry Davis | Lila Garrett & Bernie Kahn | January 23, 1969 |
| 17 | "Matchmates" | Unknown | Unknown | January 30, 1969 |
| 18 | "The Track Star" | Peter Duffell | Stanley Price & Brad Ashton | Unaired |
| 19 | "Tubby Timmy" | N/A | N/A | Unaired |
| 20 | "He Lost His Girlish Laughter" | N/A | N/A | Unaired |
