= Tour de stade =

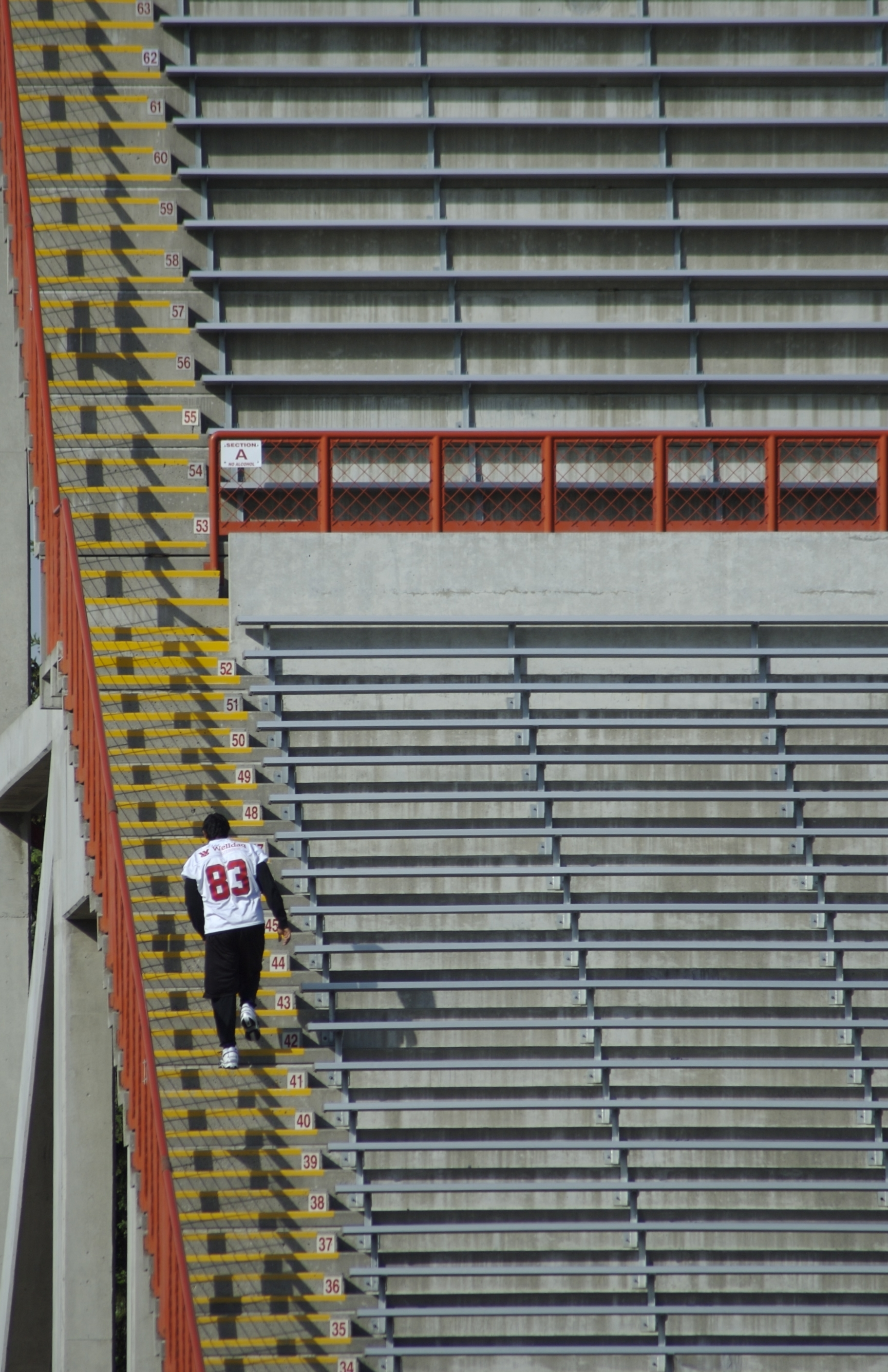

A tour de stade (French: [tuːʁ də stad], “tour of the stadium”) is a physical exercise in which a person runs up and down all the stairs in every section of a stadium. The practice is associated in particular with Harvard Stadium at Harvard University, where it has been practiced for at least fifty years by Harvard's varsity heavyweight crew team. Long-distance runners use the exercise to develop explosiveness. Stadium stair climbing challenges are popular charity events.

== In popular culture ==
In "Man of Science, Man of Faith", the first episode of season two of Lost, Jack Shephard runs a tour de stade in a flashback where he meets Desmond Hume for the first time.

To prepare for his Iron Man Match against Bret Hart at WrestleMania XII, Shawn Michaels ran a tour de stade in several promotional vignettes that were aired to hype the main event matchup.
