= New World Coming =

- Side A of the Australian single

Single by "Mama" Cass Elliot

from the album Mama's Big Ones
- B-side: "Blow Me a Kiss"
- Released: January 1970
- Genre: Pop
- Length: 2:12
- Label: Dunhill Records
- Songwriters: Barry Mann and Cynthia Weil
- Producers: Steve Barri, Joel Sill

"Mama" Cass Elliot singles chronology
"Make Your Own Kind of Music" (1969)	"New World Coming" (1970)	"One Way Ticket" (1970)

Music video
- Listen to "New World Coming" (1969 television performance) on YouTube

"New World Coming" is a pop song written by Barry Mann and Cynthia Weil which became a hit for Cass Elliot in early 1970.

== Background ==
The third consecutive single release by Cass Elliot of a Mann/Weil composition - and the first of the three to be introduced by Elliot - "New World Coming" was previewed with a December 1, 1969, performance by Elliot on the ABC-TV series The Music Scene, a month before the release of the single which featured horns and string arrangements by Jimmie Haskell and was engineered by Phil Kaye. "New World Coming" would peak at number 42 on the US Billboard Hot 100 and number 30 on Cash Box. In Canada, the pop chart peak of "New World Coming" was number 22. It also reached number four on both the American and Canadian Adult Contemporary charts.

Both Elliot's precedent single "Make Your Own Kind of Music" and "New World Coming" were - to quote producer Steve Barri - "pop songs [that] really kind of say something". Elliot would in December 1971 say that while with Dunhill Records she had been "forced to be so bubblegum that I'd stick to the floor when I walked:" Steve Barri, Dunhill's a&r vice-president who had taken over as Elliot's producer subsequent of her solo debut album, would contend he had Elliot record bubblegum music since "I wanted to capture who she was...this real fun-loving positive kind of person" and that "We never recorded anything that she didn't want to do."

Dunhill Records president Jay Lasker would say of "New World Coming": "[It's] gotten great airplay because it came along and expressed hope in the midst of despair. Unfortunately, it isn't selling all that well, so we're going back to an old theme. The message here - at least to us - is that 'the message record has had it'. [Now] Mama Cass is going to do love songs." In fact Elliot would in July 1970 sign with RCA Records, the one album release she still owed Dunhill being satisfied with the October 1970 release of Mama's Big Ones, an anthology which featured all of her solo single releases including "New World Coming" and four subsequent unsuccessful singles.

=== Weekly charts ===
Chart (1970)	Peak position
Canada RPM Top Singles	22
Canada RPM Adult Contemporary	4
US Billboard Hot 100	42
US Billboard Adult Contemporary	4
US Cash Box Top 100	30

== Covers and later uses ==
- Nina Simone covered the song on her 1971 album Here Comes the Sun.
- Melba Moore recorded the song for her 1972 album Melba Moore Live!.
- In 1979, it was sung by cast members on 'The Young and the Restless'
- DíSA covered the song for the 2016 Tim Burton film Miss Peregrine's Home For Peculiar Children.
- In 2016, the song was included in a scene in an episode of Transparent. Episode three of season two is titled "New World Coming" and features a female trio recording the song in a studio. The Nina Simone version plays over the closing credits.
