= One Way Ticket (Stephen Lawrence song) =

"One Way Ticket" is a 1967 song co-written by American composer Stephen J. Lawrence, which became Helen Reddy's first single. The lyrics were written by Bruce Hart. It was introduced by Gloria Loring on her 1968 MGM Records album, Today, produced by Bob Morgan. Loring's original rendition was not, however, released as a single.

== Helen Reddy cover ==
"One Way Ticket"
- Side A of the retail US single

Single by Helen Reddy
- B-side: "Go"
- Released: 1968 (Australia)
- Genre: Pop
- Label: Philips Records
- Songwriter(s): Bruce Hart, Stephen Lawrence
- Producer(s): Bob Halley

Helen Reddy singles chronology
"One Way Ticket" (1968)	"I Don't Know How to Love Him" (1971)

Helen Reddy covered "One Way Ticket" in 1968. It was a non-album single, and was excluded from any later compilations of her work as a result of her label change to Capitol Records. Reddy would later state - whether or not in absolute earnest - that this, her first single, sold (presumably in the US) six copies - five or even all six of them purchased by her mother-in-law. Reddy's rendition would in fact receive enough support in her native Australia to reach #83 on the national pop singles ranking, with the local hit parade for Melbourne - her birthplace - ranking the single as high as #43.

In 1973, Pickwick Records included her version on a variety LP entitled, "Helen Reddy/Shirley Bassey/Dusty Springfield."

In 1974 K-tel Records included "One Way Ticket" by Reddy in one of their TV albums, Dynamic Sound.

In 2005, Raven Records Australia included the song as a bonus track on the two-fer reissue of Helen's No Way to Treat a Lady/Music Music albums, using a tape furnished by Reddy, since none of sufficient quality could be found in the Universal vaults, which now owned Philips Records.

== Chris Rayburn cover ==
Chris Rayburn, an American singer who worked in Britain during the 1960s, recorded "One Way Ticket" for a 1968 single released in the UK and in the US. It was produced in London by Mike Hurst and arranged by Harry Robinson. Rayburn's single was released a few months after Helen Reddy's.

== Cass Elliot cover ==
"One Way Ticket"
- Side A of the UK single

Single by Mama Cass

from the album Mama's Big Ones
- B-side: "Words of Love"
- Released: September 1971 (UK)
- Recorded: 1970
- Label: Probe Records
- Songwriter(s): Bruce Hart, Stephen Lawrence
- Producer(s): Steve Barri

Mama Cass singles chronology
"New World Coming" (1970)	"One Way Ticket" (1971)	"A Song That Never Comes" (1970)

Music video
- Listen to "One Way Ticket" on YouTube

Cass Elliot covered "One Way Ticket" in 1970. Her version was included on her album, Mama's Big Ones. It was released as a single in the UK in 1971 but failed to chart.

Elliot also performed "One Way Ticket" "live" on The Andy Williams Show and The Ray Stevens Show, circa 1970.

== Later uses ==
- Elliot's version of "One Way Ticket" was featured in the 1996 British film Beautiful Thing, along with several other songs by Elliot and the Mamas and the Papas.
- Helen Reddy's version of "One Way Ticket" was sampled in 1999 in the Fatboy Slim and Freddy Fresh song "Badder Badder Schwing".
