= I Can Dream, Can't I? =

1937 song by Sammy Fain and Irving Kahal

- The Billboard October 22, 1949 full page ad featuring Gordon Jenkins, Decca's musical director and band leader/arranger on this record

Single by The Andrews Sisters with Gordon Jenkins Chorus and Orchestra
- B-side: "The Wedding of Lili Marlene"
- Published: November 13, 1937 by Mario Music Corp., New York
- Released: August 22, 1949
- Recorded: July 15, 1949
- Studio: Decca Studios, New York City
- Genre: Popular music
- Length: 2:37
- Label: Decca 24705
- Composer(s): Sammy Fain
- Lyricist(s): Irving Kahal

"I Can Dream, Can't I?," is a popular song written by Sammy Fain with lyrics by Irving Kahal that was published in 1937. It was included in a flop musical, Right This Way. Tommy Dorsey released a hit recording of it the same year, but it was in the postwar years that the song gained its greatest success. Harry James recorded a version in December 1937 for Brunswick.

The best-known version was recorded by the Andrews Sisters and Gordon Jenkins Chorus and Orchestra on July 15, 1949 (Jenkins was also arranger), and released by Decca Records as catalog number 24705. It first reached the Billboard charts on September 16, 1949, peaking at number one for five weeks on all three of the magazine's main pop charts at the time (Best Sellers in Stores, Most Played by Jockeys, and Most Played in Jukeboxes)., charting well into 1950 for 25 weeks. Jenkins would top himself a few months later when he recorded "Goodnight Irene with The Weavers, the top record of 1950, selling two million copies.

== Other cover versions ==
- In 1949, Perry Como sang the song on the NBC radio show The Chesterfield Supper Club., using Jenkins' arrangement.
- In 1959 the song was recorded by The Skyliners, vocals by Janet Vogel. Released on their debut, self-titled LP.
- in 1962 the song was recorded by British jazz singer Cleo Laine on her album All About Me.
- The song was also covered by Cass Elliot and included on her second solo album, Bubblegum, Lemonade, and... Something for Mama in 1969.
- In 1975, the Carpenters recorded the song and included it on their album, Horizon. Karen and Richard usually sang their own background vocals on their records, but on this cover, Jackie Ward, Ron Hicklin, Tom Bahler and John Bahler sang them.
- A barbershop arrangement penned by Ed Waesche became a favourite of 1978 International Barbershop Quartet Champions, the Bluegrass Student Union.
- In 2000 Joni James included the song on her album One Hundred Strings.
- In 2014 Annie Lennox included it on her Nostalgia album.
