= I've Got Bonnie =

Single by Bobby Rydell
- B-side: "Lose Her"
- Released: 1962
- Genre: Pop
- Length: 2:15
- Label: Cameo Records
- Songwriters: Gerry Goffin & Carole King

Bobby Rydell singles chronology
"I Wanna Thank You" (1961)	"I've Got Bonnie" (1962)	"I'll Never Dance Again" (1962)

"I've Got Bonnie" is a song written by Gerry Goffin and Carole King, which was released by Bobby Rydell in 1962. The song spent 11 weeks on the Billboard Hot 100 chart, peaking at No. 18, while reaching No. 5 on Canada's CHUM Hit Parade along with the B-side "Lose Her".

== Chart performance ==
Chart (1962)	Peak position
US Billboard Hot 100	18
Canada - CHUM Hit Parade	5
