= Wildwood Days =

- German release picture sleeve

Single by Bobby Rydell
- B-side: "Will You Be My Baby"
- Released: 1963
- Genre: Rock and roll
- Length: 2:27
- Label: Cameo-Parkway
- Songwriters: Kal Mann & Dave Appell

Bobby Rydell singles chronology
"Butterfly Baby" (1963)	"Wildwood Days" (1963)	"The Woodpecker Song" (1963)

"Wildwood Days" is a song released by Bobby Rydell in 1963.

Rydell's version spent 9 weeks on the Billboard Hot 100 chart, peaking at No. 17, while reaching No. 14 in Australia, and No. 21 on Canada's CHUM Hit Parade.

== Background ==
The subject of the song is Wildwood, New Jersey, a city famous for its nightlife, which was a popular location for rock and roll performances at the time the song was recorded. It eventually became the official anthem of the city, and is played on the boardwalk's stereo system routinely. The song was also featured in commercials for Wildwood. A mural on the Wildwood boardwalk (painted in 2014) honors Rydell whose song put the community into the national spotlight.

== Chart performance ==
Chart (1963)	Peak position
US Billboard Hot 100	17
Australia - Music Maker	14
Canada - CHUM Hit Parade	21

== Cover versions ==
- In 1966, Bobby Curtola released a version of the song, which reached No. 36 on Canada's "RPM 100".
