= Man of Science, Man of Faith =

- Lost episode
- In a flashback, Jack and Desmond meet at a stadium, though this would not be their final encounter.
- Episode no.: Season 2 Episode 1
- Directed by: Jack Bender
- Written by: Damon Lindelof
- Production code: 201
- Original air date: September 21, 2005
- Running time: 43 minutes

Guest appearances
- John Terry as Christian Shephard; Henry Ian Cusick as Desmond Hume; Julie Bowen as Sarah; Anson Mount as Kevin; Katie Doyle as Buchanan; David Ely as Intern; Masayo Ford as Nurse; Julius Ledda as EMT; Ivana Michele Smith as Survivor; Larry Wiss as Anesthesiologist

Episode chronology
← Previous "Exodus"	Next → "Adrift"
- Lost season 2

"Man of Science, Man of Faith" is the first episode of the second season of Lost and the 26th episode overall. The episode was directed by Jack Bender and written by Damon Lindelof. It first aired on September 21, 2005, on ABC. The flashbacks focus on Jack Shephard's struggle to heal Sarah, who would later become his wife. In real time, John Locke and Kate Austen decide to enter the now open hatch shaft.

While writing the season premiere, the producers decided to pick up the hatch storyline which was left hanging after season one's finale "Exodus", leaving the raft events to be explained in the following episode, "Adrift". "Man of Science, Man of Faith" received positive reviews, and stands as the most-watched episode of the series in North America, with 23.47 million viewers.

== Plot ==
=== Introduction ===
A man wakes up in his bunk bed to a beeping and immediately presses a few keys on what appears to be a late 1970s-era computer. He then gets dressed and begins his day as the camera moves about the surrounding rooms, which contain an assortment of objects from the 1960s to the present. He puts on some music, begins an exercise routine, has a shower, makes himself some breakfast, and injects himself with a vaccine. He is interrupted by an explosion, spurring the man to arm himself before using a telescope-and-mirror system. His gaze reveals the faces of Jack Shephard (Matthew Fox) and John Locke (Terry O'Quinn) standing around the now open Hatch shaft.

=== Flashbacks ===
Jack encounters his future wife, Sarah (Julie Bowen), who has arrived in his emergency room after a car crash. Jack saves Sarah's life, but goes on to tell her that due to spinal cord injury, it is unlikely that Sarah will regain the ability to walk.

After being chastised by his father (John Terry) about his pessimistic bedside manner, Jack operates on Sarah, and goes running a tour de stade. While running he falls, and meets another runner named Desmond (Henry Ian Cusick), who tells him that he is training for a race around the world. Jack shares with Desmond how he failed Sarah, and Desmond advises him about his need to feel and provide more hope. When Jack returns to Sarah's room, he discovers that she has experienced a miraculous recovery.

=== On the island ===
At the Hatch entry, Locke says that they should not wait for the sun to come up to enter the Hatch. Jack, on the other hand, feels that their entry should be delayed. At the same time, at the caves, Shannon Rutherford (Maggie Grace) and Sayid Jarrah (Naveen Andrews) search the jungle for Walt's (Malcolm David Kelley) dog, Vincent. During the search, Shannon has a vision of Walt, dripping wet and speaking incoherently. She talks about this with the rest of the survivors, but no one believes her.

Upon reaching the caves, Jack explains the situation to the survivors, promising them they will be all right along with Kate, as long as they stay together. Locke then appears, carrying cable and saying he is going into the hatch. Soon after, Kate Austen (Evangeline Lilly) follows behind him. While Locke is easing her down the shaft, Kate mysteriously disappears during a sudden burst of light from within the Hatch.

Back at the caves, after informing the survivors why they went into the jungle and that Dr. Arzt (Daniel Roebuck) is dead, Jack decides that he is going after Kate and Locke. Upon reaching the Hatch, he finds no one there and rappels down the shaft on his own. While exploring, he comes across a painted mural, and a wall where the key hanging around his neck is pulled by a strong magnetic force. Finally, after being surprised by a bright light and loud music, he enters what appears to be an underground geodesic dome with computer equipment, including an Apple II Plus computer with its prompt glowing and its shift key relabeled execute. As Jack is about to use it, Locke appears and tells Jack not to touch it. After Jack raises the gun and asks where Kate is, Locke is revealed to be at gunpoint. The gunman threatens that he will shoot Locke if Jack does not surrender. Jack refuses, instead taunting Locke about his destiny. Finally, the gunman steps out and Jack seems to recognize him. The gunman is Desmond.

== Production ==
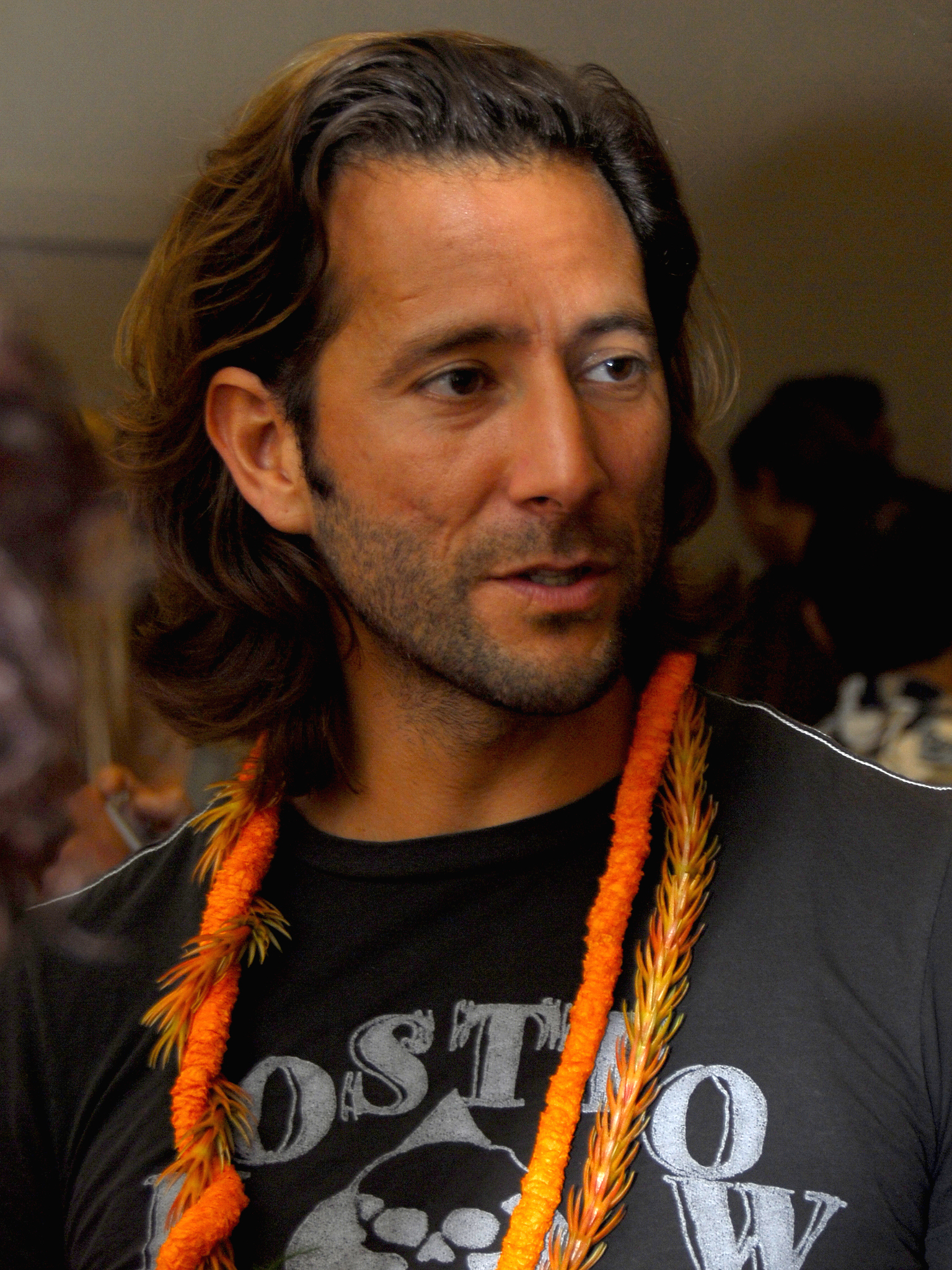
Henry Ian Cusick made his debut as Desmond Hume in this episode.

While "Man of Science, Man of Faith" alludes to a quote in the previous episode where Locke describes himself as a man of faith and Jack as a man of science, writer Damon Lindelof stated that the episode has the title to imply that Jack is both, with the flashback making the empiricist "man of science" facing a miracle while treating a patient. The episode was written to focus on the opening of the hatch, so the other cliffhanger left in "Exodus", the destruction of Michael's boat and the kidnapping of his son Walt by the Others, would be explained in the second episode, "Adrift". The cliffhanger also influenced the tone: the protagonists are expecting an attack by the Others, but the audience knows the Others are not coming since they were going for the boat instead. To make the episode accessible to new viewers, many instances of dialogue recap events of the first season.

The producers decided to start the episode inside The Swan because they considered the audience would expect to pick up from Locke and Jack looking into the hatch shaft, so the opening instead is filmed in a place that does not reveal its location or period - director Jack Bender stated it made him remember a San Francisco apartment - until the explosion of the hatch. For the flashbacks, Bender decided to avoid making the hospital scenes similar to ER, filming mostly with handheld cameras to give a "spontaneous feel" to the scene. Sarah's operation was filmed in an actual surgery room in Oahu, while Aloha Stadium in Honolulu is used for Jack and Desmond's tour de stade.

Starting in this episode, the castaways start abandoning the caves, which the producers considered a location hard to film and "not aesthetically good". The Swan would become a centerpiece location because of its mysteries and the commodities given to the protagonists, such as electricity and food. The station was designed to invoke modernism of the 1970s, similar to how Disneyland's Tomorrowland evokes what was modern in the 1960s, but with an appearance that decayed after decades without maintenance. Foreshadowing the fact that the station is used for dangerous means, the design added the concrete wall with a magnetic force. The hatch shaft was completely computer generated with shots filmed using a greenscreen.

This is the first episode to feature the song "Make Your Own Kind of Music" by Mama Cass, which is heard in many later episodes. Lindelof picked the song as it reminded him of his childhood, as his mother "used to listen to on Sunday mornings, when she’d put on music, vacuum and cry." Lindelof also declared that the song "lyrically felt right", and had a haunting feeling due to Mama Cass' personal history.

== Reception ==
The season premiere hit a ratings high for the series, with 23.47 million American viewers. The episode was third in the weekly audience ranking, behind CSI: Crime Scene Investigation and Desperate Housewives, and stands as the most watched episode of Lost.

Critical reviews were positive. Jeff Jensen of Entertainment Weekly was frustrated at the episode not revealing what happened to the raft characters and unveiling of so many new mysteries, but liked the writing and symbolism considering that "the whole enigmatic enterprise seemed grounded in rich layers of meaning". TV Squad's Keith McDuffee said he was "held in suspense" throughout the episode. Chris Carabott of IGN rated "Man of Science, Man of Faith" 9.3 out of 10, praising the flashbacks for being "edited incredibly well with the on island content" and Julie Bowen's performance as Sarah. The Chicago Tribune's Maureen Ryan described the episode as "a wonderfully paced, terrific return to form". Ryan Mcgee of Zap2it considered the introduction in the hatch and Desmond's scene with Jack at the stadium to be the highlights of the season premiere.

Director of photography Michael Bonvillain was nominated for a Primetime Emmy Award for Outstanding Cinematography for a Single-Camera Series for this episode. IGN ranked "Man of Science, Man of Faith" the 18th best episode of Lost, while a similar list by Los Angeles Times ranked the episode 11th, saying it had the best Jack flashback and demonstrated "a show confident in itself and at the height of its powers".
