= Bobby Rydell/Chubby Checker =

Studio album by Bobby Rydell and Chubby Checker
- Released: 1961
- Genre: Rock and roll
- Label: Cameo Records
- Producer: Kal Mann

Singles from Bobby Rydell/Chubby Checker
- 1. "Jingle Bell Rock" Released: December 1961; 2. "Teach Me to Twist" Released: April 1962

Bobby Rydell/Chubby Checker is a studio album by Bobby Rydell and Chubby Checker which was released in 1961.

Professional ratings
Review scores
Source	Rating
Allmusic	4.5/5 stars

The song "Your Hits and Mine (Medley)" features Rydell's and Checker's hit songs "Kissin' Time", "We Got Love", "Volare", "Wild One", "The Twist", "Pony Time", "Hucklebuck", and "Let's Twist Again".

== Track listing ==
=== Side 1 ===
1. "Swingin' Together" (Kal Mann, Dave Appell)
2. "Your Hits and Mine (Medley)"
3. "Jingle Bell Rock" (Joe Beal, Jim Boothe)
4. "Teach Me to Twist" (Kal Mann, Dave Appell)

=== Side 2 ===
1. "Side by Side" (Harry M. Woods)
2. "Jingle Bell Imitations" (Kal Mann, Dave Appell)
3. "What Are You Doing New Year’s Eve" (Frank Loesser)
4. "My Baby Cares for Me" (Walter Donaldson, Gus Kahn)
5. "Voodoo (You Remind Me of the Guy)" (Don Azpiazú, Marion Sunshine)
6. "Walkin’ My Baby Back Home" (Fred Ahlert, Roy Turk)

== Charts ==
Album

Year	Chart	Peak position
1961	Billboard Top LPs	7

Singles

Year	Single	Chart	Peak position
1961	"Jingle Bell Rock"	U.S. Pop	21
1962	"Teach Me to Twist"	U.S. Pop	109
1962	"Jingle Bell Rock"	U.S. Pop	92
1962	"Jingle Bell Rock"	UK Singles	40
