= Forget Him (Bobby Rydell song) =

Single by Bobby Rydell

from the album Forget Him
- B-side: "Love, Love Go Away"
- Released: 30 April 1963
- Recorded: February 1963, Pye Studios, London, England
- Genre: Pop
- Length: 2:08
- Label: Cameo-Parkway Records
- Songwriter: Tony Hatch (as Mark Anthony)
- Producer: Tony Hatch

Bobby Rydell singles chronology
"Let's Make Love Tonight" (1963)	"Forget Him" (1963)	"Little Girl You've Had a Busy Day" (1964)

"Forget Him" is a song written by Tony Hatch and released in 1963 by Bobby Rydell. The song spent 16 weeks on the Billboard Hot 100 chart, peaking at No. 4 on January 18, 1964, while it spent 14 weeks on the United Kingdom's Record Retailer chart, reaching No. 13. The song also reached No. 3 on Billboard's Middle-Road Singles chart, No. 3 on Canada's CHUM Hit Parade, No. 8 on the Irish Singles Chart, and No. 2 in Hong Kong.

The song first charted in the United Kingdom on May 29, 1963. It received significant airplay, began to rise in the charts and was noticed by Paul McCartney. In 2000, McCartney said the initial idea for "She Loves You" came from a Bobby Rydell hit that was popular at the time (mid-1963). Lennon and McCartney started composing "She Loves You" on June 26, 1963 (about four weeks after the release of "Forget Him" in the UK). "She Loves You" was completed the following day.

"Forget Him" peaked in the United States in early 1964 and was ranked No. 20 on Cash Box's "Top 100 Chart Hits of 1964".

== Chart performance ==
Chart (1963–1964)	Peak position
Canada (CHUM Hit Parade)	3
Hong Kong	2
Ireland (IRMA)	8
New Zealand (Lever Hit Parade)	4
UK Record Retailer	13
US Billboard Hot 100	4
US Billboard Middle-Road Singles	3
US Cash Box Top 100	5

== Cover versions ==
English rock and roll singer Billy Fury covered "Forget Him" as a non-album single in 1983. It became a hit in the United Kingdom, reaching #59. Brazilian singer Roberto Carlos covered the song in 1966 as "Esqueça" ("Forget" in Portuguese).
