= Will-O-Bees =

American folk rock and sunshine pop trio in the 1960s

The Will-O-Bees
- Origin: Richmond, Indiana, U.S.
- Genres: Folk rock, sunshine pop
- Years active: c.1966–1969
- Labels: Date, SGC
- Past members: Janet Blossom; Steve Porter; Robert Merchanthouse

The Will-O-Bees were an American folk rock and sunshine pop trio in the 1960s comprising Janet Blossom, Steven Porter, and Robert Merchanthouse (born c.1946, Indiana, died 2019).

== Career ==
Blossom and Merchanthouse both attended Richmond High School, Indiana. The trio initially performed in a style similar to Peter, Paul and Mary. Recording in New York City, they released their first single, "Why Can't They Accept Us" – written and produced by Roger Atkins and Carl D'Errico, co-writers of the Animals' hit "It's My Life" – on Date Records in July 1966. The group was associated with the Screen Gems publishing company. Their second single, "Shades of Gray", was written by the company's staff writers Barry Mann and Cynthia Weil, and produced by Bill Traut of Dunwich Productions; the B-side, "If You're Ready", had originally been recorded by the Del-Vetts, another group managed by Traut. "Shades of Gray" was later recorded by the Monkees in 1967 on their album Headquarters. The Will-O-Bees' third single, "It's Not Easy", another Mann-Weil composition produced by Traut, was their only chart success, reaching #95 on the Billboard Hot 100 in February 1968. "It's Not Easy" was originally written for the Righteous Brothers, and had first been recorded in London in 1966 by Australian pop singer Normie Rowe; his version was a chart hit in Australia and New Zealand.

In 1968, the Will-O-Bees transferred to Screen Gems' own SGC label, and released three further singles, again produced by Traut. These included the Mann-Weil songs "Make Your Own Kind of Music" and "It's Getting Better", which were both later recorded more successfully by Mama Cass Elliot. The Will-O-Bees also recorded and released the theme song of the unsuccessful TV sitcom The Ugliest Girl in Town, written by Howard Greenfield and Helen Miller. However, none of the group's SGC recordings made the charts, and the group made no further recordings after early 1969.

== Discography ==
- "Why Can't They Accept Us?" / "The World I Used To Know" (Date, 1966)
- "Shades of Gray" / "If You're Ready" (Date, 1966)
- "It's Not Easy" / "Looking Glass" (Date, 1967)
- "Make Your Own Kind of Music" / "Listen To The Music" (SGC, 1968)
- "The Ugliest Girl In Town" / "I Can't Quit Lovin' You Baby" (SGC, 1968)
- "November Monday" / "It's Getting Better" (SGC, 1969)
