= Adrift (Lost) =

- Lost episode
- Michael and Sawyer on the destroyed raft
- Episode no.: Season 2 Episode 2
- Directed by: Stephen Williams
- Written by: Steven Maeda; Leonard Dick
- Production code: 202
- Original air date: September 28, 2005
- Running time: 41 minutes

Guest appearances
- Adewale Akinnuoye-Agbaje as Mr. Eko; Henry Ian Cusick as Desmond Hume; Tamara Taylor as Susan Lloyd; Saul Rubinek as Finney; Jeanetta Arnette as Lizzy

Episode chronology
← Previous "Man of Science, Man of Faith"	Next → "Orientation"
- Lost season 2

"Adrift" is the second episode of the second season of Lost and the 27th episode overall. The episode was directed by Stephen Williams and written by Steven Maeda and Leonard Dick. It first aired on September 28, 2005, on the American Broadcasting Company. In the episode, flashbacks depict Michael Dawson's struggles for the custody of his son Walt Lloyd. The realtime events show Michael and Sawyer, who have just had their raft destroyed, becoming hostile towards each other as they drift back to shore, while Kate Austen and John Locke enter the mysterious hatch and encounter Desmond Hume.

The storyline picks up the raft storyline which was left hanging after season one's finale, "Exodus", and also revisits the events seen in the previous episode, "Man of Science, Man of Faith". Originally envisioned as a Sawyer episode, the episode was rewritten to focus on Michael. The sea scenes were shot on the Hawaiian shoreline. "Adrift" had 23.17 million American viewers and stands as the second largest audience on the series' run, but received negative reviews, which focused criticism on the flashbacks, the raft scenes, and the lack of plot advancement.

== Plot ==
=== Flashbacks ===
In the flashbacks, Michael Dawson (Harold Perrineau) struggles with his ex-girlfriend Susan Lloyd (Tamara Taylor), who has asked Michael to sign away his paternal rights to their son, Walt. Although Michael initially resists, suing in order to keep his custody, he eventually relents as Susan persuades him to doubt his own motivations and whether he is pursuing his own desires or Walt's best interests.

=== On the Island ===
After the raft was attacked and destroyed by the Others, Sawyer (Josh Holloway) surfaces in the ocean. Michael is heard screaming for Walt repeatedly, and Sawyer screams for Jin-Soo Kwon (Daniel Dae Kim). Sawyer decides to rescue Michael first, and swims over to him, dragging him onto a piece of flotsam and performing CPR. Michael then wakes up, and blames Sawyer for making him fire the flare, drawing their attackers to them. Shortly after, the two notice a shark is circling them; Michael believes the shark was attracted to Sawyer's bleeding wound, and the two have continuous arguments.

Back at camp, after Kate Austen (Evangeline Lilly) disappears into the hatch, John Locke (Terry O'Quinn) descends as well, and finds her unconscious in the computer room. An armed Desmond (Henry Ian Cusick) walks up behind them, and asks Locke if he is "him". Locke at first claims to be the person whom Desmond is seeking, but fails to correctly answer a riddle he poses. This failure prompts Desmond to round up the two and orders Kate to tie up Locke. However, Locke convinces Desmond that Kate be tied up instead. Desmond agrees, and Locke slides her a knife before locking her in a dark room. Kate frees herself and finds she is in a large pantry filled with foodstuffs, all in boxes bearing a strange marking. Kate then climbs into a ventilation shaft while Desmond interrogates Locke about the outside world and finds out about the plane crash.

The plotline converges to the same point at the end of the previous episode, "Man of Science, Man of Faith". An alarm klaxon begins to sound. Desmond walks Locke at gunpoint to the computer terminal, and forces him to enter "the numbers" into the computer, which resets a 108 minute timer. Soon after, Desmond detects Jack Shephard (Matthew Fox), and after channeling him to the computer room, forces Locke to greet Jack as seen in the previous episode.

Back at the raft, Michael and Sawyer see one of the raft's pontoons, and they decide to board it. Sawyer swims to the pontoon, giving Michael his gun in case the shark appears. When it does, Michael fires several times, apparently injuring the shark. Michael then joins Sawyer on the pontoon, and when the morning breaks, he cries, realizing that he should not have brought Walt with him on the raft, and blames himself for his son's kidnapping. At this point, Sawyer notices that they are back near the island. When they wash ashore, they meet Jin running toward them, hands tied behind his back, shouting the word "Others", and fleeing a group holding him captive.

== Production ==
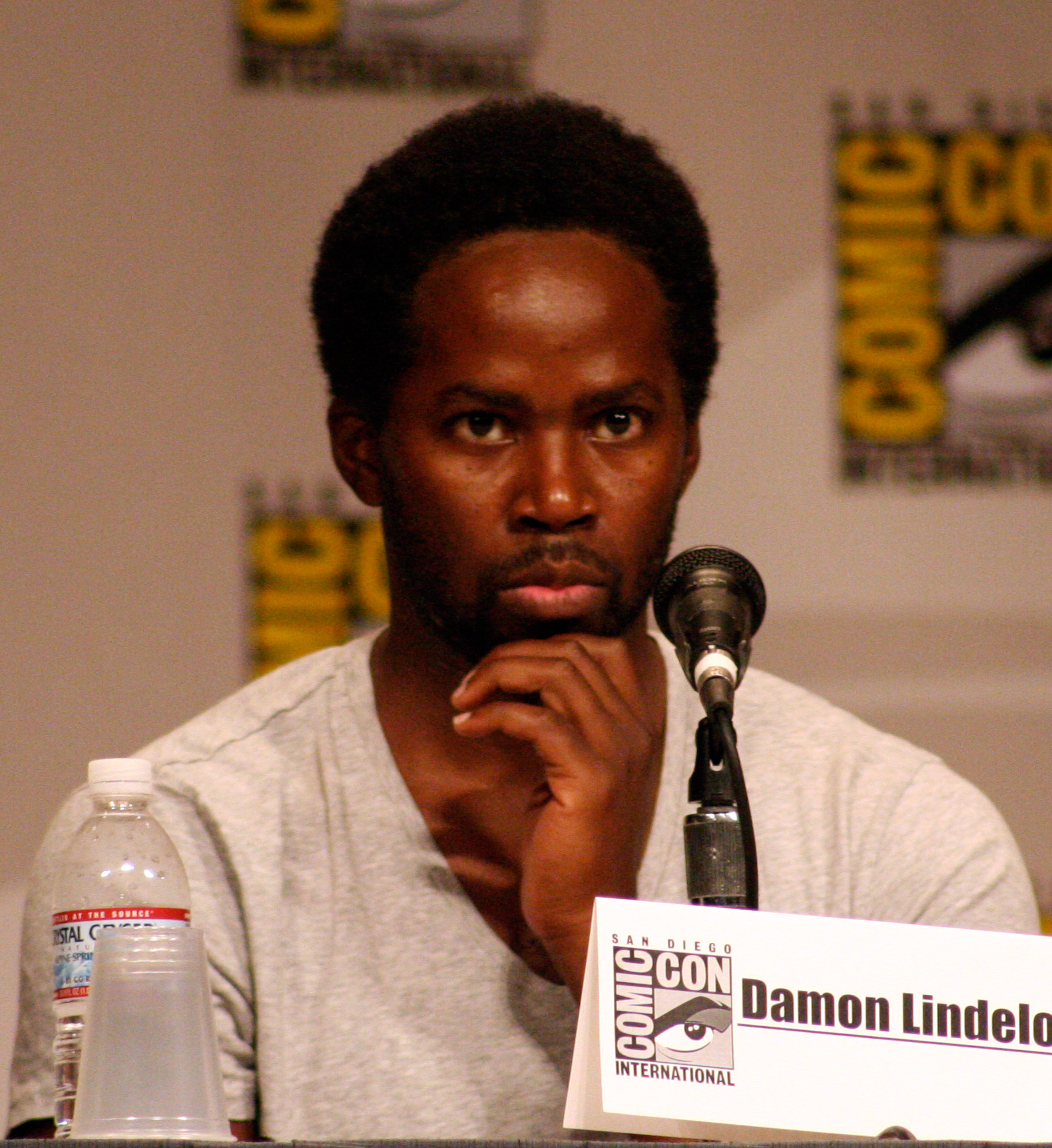
Harold Perrineau had swimming lessons between the first and second seasons in preparation for this episode.

Season one's final episode finishes with two cliffhangers, the opening of the hatch and the attack of the Others on Michael's boat. When production of season 2 started, the writers decided that season premiere "Man of Science, Man of Faith" would focus on the hatch, leaving the raft for the second episode. To avoid bloating the first episode, some of the hatch storylines, such as Locke's incursion, were left to be revealed in "Adrift". The episode was originally going to be Sawyer centric, and was to feature actress Jolene Blalock as a guest, but this was rewritten "at the proverbial last minute" and changed to a Michael-centric episode.

Director Stephen Williams described filming at the sea as challenging, since the waves caused cameras, lighting and the scenery where the actors were standing to be "moving out of sync with one another". Williams, however, thought that the scenes became more realistic due to the location. The aquatic scenes took three nights to complete, and Harold Perrineau received swimming lessons in preparation. When Sawyer is getting ready to swim to the other platform, a shark swims past, and in an underwater shot a DHARMA Initiative insignia can briefly be seen near its back fin. This was an inside joke or "easter egg," which turned out to be more visible than had been intended. While a mechanical shark which required three puppeteers was built, the shot of Michael being attacked was done with a shark fin being held by an underwater crew member.

== Reception ==
=== Ratings ===
23.17 million American viewers tuned into "Adrift", making it the second most-watched episode in the show's history, behind the season opener.

=== Critical reception ===
Reviews were mostly negative. Mac Slocum of Filmfodder.com said the flashback storyline "wasn't all that interesting". Entertainment Weekly's Jeff Jensen called the flashbacks "among the poorest and most clumsily integrated flashbacks we've seen so far", as he felt nothing new was learned, and also disliked Michael's on-island storyline, noting he "got the sense that the actors and directors weren't quite sure what to make of these scenes". Jensen, however, complimented the hatch scenes, considering that Terry O'Quinn's performance and his interaction with Henry Ian Cusick were "salvaging the first mediocre episode of the season". Ryan Mcgee of Zap2it thought that revealing the hatch events through different perspectives was a "fresh narrative approach", but complained about the lack of plot advancement, and considered the raft storyline "three times as long as needed, with a really fake shark attack to boot". IGN's Chris Carabott gave the episode an 8.2 out of 10, praising Perrineau's performance and the flashback, but the website later ranked "Adrift" 80th out of the 115 Lost episodes, jokingly saying that the shark should have eaten Michael "and save us a lot of 'Waaaaaalt!' and 'They took him. From my hands!' shout fests". A similar list by Los Angeles Times ranked the episode as the fourth worst of the series, describing it as "boring". New York magazine listed "Adrift" in its "Twenty Most Pointless Episodes of Lost", complaining about "grinding the story to a halt" and the "plodding" flashback, and saying that the episode would have been improved if Sawyer and Michael reached land faster.
