= Jingle Bell Rock =

Single by Bobby Helms
- B-side: "Captain Santa Claus; (and His Reindeer Space Patrol)"
- Released: November 28, 1957
- Recorded: October 29, 1957
- Studio: Bradley Film and Recording Studio (Nashville)
- Genre: Christmas; rock and roll; rockabilly; country
- Length: 2:12
- Label: Decca
- Songwriters: Joe Beal; Jim Boothe
- Producer: Paul Cohen

Bobby Helms singles chronology
"My Special Angel" (1957)	"Jingle Bell Rock" (1957)	"Just a Little Lonesome" (1958)

Audio
- "Jingle Bell Rock" on YouTube

"Jingle Bell Rock" is a Christmas song first released by Bobby Helms in 1957. It, alongside various cover versions, have received frequent airplay in the United States during every Christmas season since then, and is generally considered Helms' signature song. "Jingle Bell Rock" was composed by Joseph Carleton Beal and James Ross Boothe, although both Helms and session guitarist on the song Hank Garland disputed this (see Authorship controversy section below). Beal was a Massachusetts-born public relations professional and longtime resident of South Ocean Avenue in Atlantic City, New Jersey, and Boothe was an American writer in the advertising business.

== Helms recordings ==
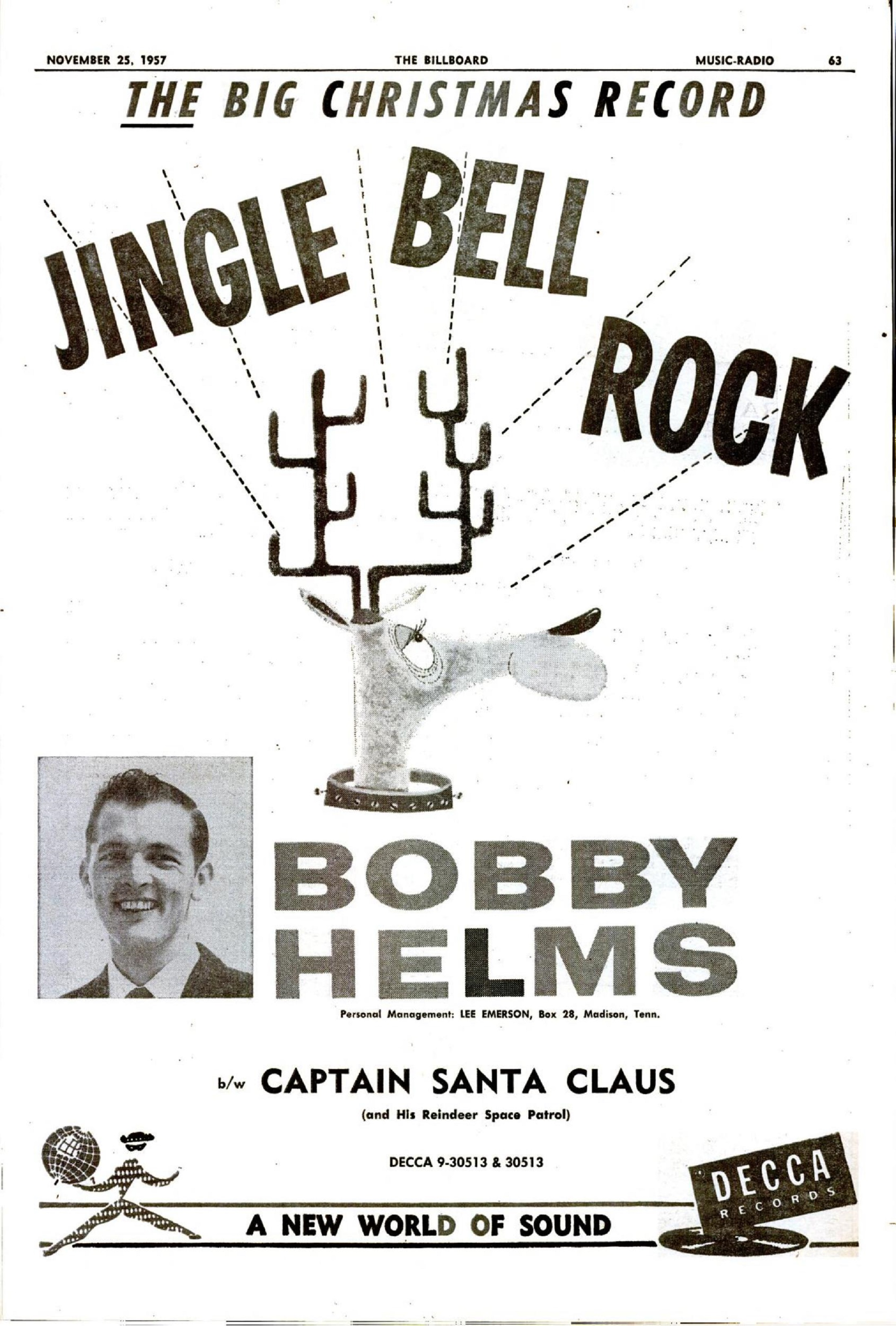
Billboard advertisement, November 25, 1957

"Jingle Bell Rock" has been performed by many, but Helms's first version from 1957 produced by Paul Cohen is arguably the best known. The song's title and some of its lyrics are an extension of the old Christmas standard, "Jingle Bells". It makes brief references to other popular songs of the 1950s, such as "Rock Around the Clock", and mentions going to a "Jingle hop"; otherwise it is a fairly basic swingin' pop Christmas melody. After a brief introduction, Hank Garland supplies electric lead guitar chord flourishes mainly during the fills on the recording. Backup singers were the Anita Kerr Singers.

Helms' original version, on Decca 9-30513 from October 1957, was re-recorded by him on Kapp K-719 in 1965, and yet again in 1967 on Little Darlin' LD-0038. In 1970, Helms recorded an entire album titled Jingle Bell Rock on Certron C-7013, releasing the title track on Certron C-10021, with a picture sleeve. In yet another re-recording, Helms released a version on Ashley AS-4200 (1971). He again recorded the song for Gusto Records, it was subsequently released on their "Power Pak" label. In 1983, Helms released his last recording of "Jingle Bell Rock" on Black Rose 82713.

D-TV set this version to the Disney shorts, Once Upon a Wintertime from Melody Time and On Ice.

=== Personnel ===
- Bobby Helms – vocals, guitar
- Henry Ade – steel guitar
- Hank Garland – guitar
- Anita Kerr Singers – backing vocals

== Brenda Lee recording ==
Brenda Lee recorded the song on June 23, 1964, for her album Merry Christmas from Brenda Lee on the Decca label. It was released less than four months later on October 19. The album reached No. 7 on the Billboard charts with the song "Rockin' Around the Christmas Tree" reaching No. 1 on Billboard Hot 100 in 2023. Lee's recording of "Jingle Bell Rock" has charted every year on the Billboard Top 100 since 2019.

== Cover versions ==
Lindsay Lohan covered the song in 2022 for her Netflix film Falling for Christmas as a nod to her performance of the track in 2004's teen comedy Mean Girls.

The Vivienne and Tia Kofi covered the song in 2021.

== Authorship controversy ==
Helms, as well as session guitarist on the song Hank Garland, both claimed until their deaths, that it was they, not Beal and Boothe, who wrote the song. They claimed that the original song by Beal and Boothe was called Jingle Bell Hop, and that it was given to Helms by a Decca executive to record. According to Helms and Garland, that song had little to no resemblance to the current one. Helms did not like it and, as a result, they both proceeded to work on it, changing the music, lyrics and tempo, and also giving it a previously missing bridge. The new song, they claimed, was the one that is known today. However, neither of them received writing credit or subsequent writing royalties.

"I really didn't want to cut it because it was such a bad song. So me and one of the musicians [Hank Garland] worked on it for about an hour putting a melody to it and we put a bridge to it," said Helms [in a 1992 interview].

"I let it hop back to where it came from" Garland recalled. "It wasn't any good. [Bobby and I] came up with the 'Jingle Bell Rock' America hears every holiday season," he [Garland] said [in a 2001 interview].

Billy Garland, brother of Hank Garland, maintains his deceased brother's story, and has long been involved with and vocal about the issue.

== Chart and sales performance ==
The original version of Helms charted at No. 13 on Billboard's Most Played C&W by Jockeys chart, a predecessor to the Hot Country Songs chart. It also crossed to the pop charts, peaking at No. 6 on the Billboard Best Sellers in Stores chart, and at No. 11 on Cashbox magazine's Top 60 on the week ending January 11, 1958.

After the song was featured on the soundtrack album to the 1996 film Jingle All the Way, the original Bobby Helms version returned to the Billboard country singles charts in late 1996 and early 1997, reaching a peak of No. 60.

The Helms version entered the Billboard Hot 100 chart on the week ending January 9, 2016, which was the song's first entry on the chart since its last appearance on the week ending December 29, 1962. On the week ending January 7, 2017, "Jingle Bell Rock" hit at number 29. In January 2019, the song entered the Hot 100's top 10 for the first time reaching No. 8. With this feat, Helms broke the record for the longest wait to the Hot 100's top 10 as he achieved this in 60 years, four months, and two weeks after his first entry back in 1958. Helms's recording reached No. 3 on the chart dated January 4, 2020. It reached a new peak of No. 2 on the chart dated December 27, 2025.

Year	Chart debut/re-entry date	Peak chart position	Ref.
1958	December 22	35	
1960	December 12	36	
1961	December 11	41	
1962	December 8	56	
2016	January 9	47	
2016	December 24	29	
2018	January 3	50	
2018	December 8	8	
2019	December 7	3	
2020	December 5	3	
2021	December 4	3	
2022	November 26	3	
2023	November 25	3	
2024	December 7	3	
2025	November 22	2	
2026	November 21	28	

According to Nielsen SoundScan, the digital track of Helms's original Decca recording was ninth on the list of all-time best-selling Christmas/holiday digital singles in SoundScan history in 2016 with 780,000 downloads. As of December 2019, it has sold 891,000 copies in the United States. Recently, the track was performed by artists like Brenda Lee and Ariana Grande.

=== Bobby Helms ===
==== Weekly charts ====
Weekly chart performance for "Jingle Bell Rock" by Bobby Helms
Chart (1957–2026)	Peak position
Australia (ARIA)	4
Austria (Ö3 Austria Top 40)	5
Belgium (Ultratop 50 Flanders)	10
Belgium (Ultratop 50 Wallonia)	13
Canada Hot 100 (Billboard)	4
CIS Airplay (TopHit)	173
Croatia (Billboard)	7
Czech Republic Singles Digital (ČNS IFPI)	21
Denmark (Tracklisten)	6
Finland (Suomen virallinen lista)	10
Estonia Airplay (TopHit)	22
France (SNEP)	35
Germany (GfK)	6
Global 200 (Billboard)	4
Greece International (IFPI)	4
Hungary (Single Top 40)	5
Hungary (Stream Top 40)	5
Iceland (Tónlistinn)	14
Ireland (IRMA)	5
Italy (FIMI)	3
Japan Hot Overseas (Billboard Japan)	4
Kazakhstan Airplay (TopHit)	59
Latvia Streaming (LaIPA)	3
Lithuania (AGATA)	3
Luxembourg (Billboard)	4
Netherlands (Single Top 100)	10
New Zealand (Recorded Music NZ)	4
Norway (VG-lista)	10
Philippines Hot 100 (Billboard Philippines)	35
Poland (Polish Streaming Top 100)	4
Portugal (AFP)	5
Romania Airplay (TopHit)	86
Russia Streaming (TopHit)	42
Scottish Singles Sales (Official Charts)	81
Singapore (RIAS)	15
Slovakia Singles Digital (ČNS IFPI)	8
Slovenia Airplay (SloTop50)	16
South Africa Streaming (RISA)	50
Spain (PROMUSICAE)	21
Sweden (Sverigetopplistan)	4
Switzerland (Schweizer Hitparade)	5
Turkey International Airplay (Radiomonitor Türkiye)	9
United Arab Emirates Streaming (IFPI)	10
UK Singles (Official Charts)	5
UK Independent (Official Charts)	4
Ukraine Airplay (TopHit)	69
US Billboard Hot 100	2
US Adult Contemporary (Billboard)	18
US Hot Country Songs (Billboard)	60
US Holiday 100 (Billboard)	2
US Best Sellers in Stores (Billboard)	6
US Most Played C&W by Jockeys (Billboard)	13
US Rolling Stone Top 100	3
Vietnam (Vietnam Hot 100)	91

==== Monthly charts ====
Monthly chart performance
Chart (2025)	Peak position
Estonia Airplay (TopHit)	51

==== Year-end charts ====
2020 year-end chart performance for "Jingle Bell Rock" by Bobby Helms
Chart (2020)	Position
Hungary (Stream Top 40)	81

2021 year-end chart performance for "Jingle Bell Rock" by Bobby Helms
Chart (2021)	Position
Global 200 (Billboard)	182
Hungary (Stream Top 40)	91

2022 year-end chart performance for "Jingle Bell Rock"
Chart (2022)	Position
Global 200 (Billboard)	167
Hungary (Stream Top 40)	97
US Billboard Hot 100	86

2023 year-end chart performance for "Jingle Bell Rock"
Chart (2023)	Position
Canada (Canadian Hot 100)	89
Global 200 (Billboard)	165
Hungary (Single Top 40)	53
US Billboard Hot 100	68

2024 year-end chart performance for "Jingle Bell Rock"
Chart (2024)	Position
Canada (Canadian Hot 100)	92
Global 200 (Billboard)	164
US Billboard Hot 100	68

2025 year-end chart performance for "Jingle Bell Rock"
Chart (2025)	Position
Canada (Canadian Hot 100)	98
Global 200 (Billboard)	149
Switzerland (Schweizer Hitparade)	99
US Billboard Hot 100	81

=== Brenda Lee ===
Weekly chart performance for "Jingle Bell Rock" by Brenda Lee
Chart (2019–2022)	Peak position
US Holiday 100 (Billboard)	89
US Holiday 100 (Billboard)	68
US Holiday 100 (Billboard)	90
US Holiday 100 (Billboard)	76

=== George Strait ===
Chart performance for "Jingle Bell Rock" by George Strait
Chart (2000)	Peak position
US Hot Country Songs (Billboard)	69

=== Aaron Tippin ===
Chart performance for "Jingle Bell Rock" by Aaron Tippin
Chart (2002)	Peak position
US Hot Country Songs (Billboard)	52

=== Rascal Flatts ===
Chart performance for "Jingle Bell Rock" by Rascal Flatts
Chart (2008)	Peak position
US Hot Country Songs (Billboard)	29

=== Blake Shelton and Miranda Lambert ===
Chart performance for "Jingle Bell Rock" by Blake Shelton and Miranda Lambert
Chart (2012)	Peak position
US Hot Country Songs (Billboard)	37
US Country Airplay (Billboard)	34

=== Various artists version ===
Chart performance for "Jingle Bell Rock" by various artists
Chart (2019)	Peak position
US Rolling Stone Top 100	48

=== Cascada version ===
Chart performance for "Jingle Bell Rock" by Cascada
Chart (2025)	Peak position
Ukraine Airplay (TopHit)	87

== Hall & Oates version ==
Hall & Oates and their band released a version in 1983 as a non-album single which peaked at number 30 on the Hot 100 Recurrents chart in 2005; it also reached number 6 on the Billboard's Holiday Airplay chart on December 13, 2008, and number 24 on the Hot Holiday Songs chart on December 10, 2011. There are two video versions: one with Daryl Hall and another with John Oates singing lead. Both versions feature G. E. Smith as a grandma, playing the guitar with gloves.

=== Weekly charts ===
Chart performance for "Jingle Bell Rock" by Hall & Oates
Chart (1983–2024)	Peak position
Australia (ARIA)	32
Austria (Ö3 Austria Top 40)	36
Germany (GfK)	30
Global 200 (Billboard)	92
Greece International Digital Singles (IFPI)	96
Hungary (Single Top 40)	31
Hungary (Stream Top 40)	27
Ireland (IRMA)	73
Lithuania (AGATA)	68
Netherlands (Single Top 100)	30
New Zealand (Recorded Music NZ)	20
Poland Airplay (ZPAV)	79
Poland (Polish Streaming Top 100)	83
Portugal (AFP)	49
Sweden (Sverigetopplistan)	51
Switzerland (Schweizer Hitparade)	54
UK Singles (Official Charts)	80
US Holiday 100 (Billboard)	24

== Max Bygraves UK version ==
Max Bygraves released a version in 1959 with the Eric Rogers Orchestra which peaked at number 7 in the UK Top 30, released on Decca: F11176

== Chubby Checker & Bobby Rydell version ==
Chubby Checker & Bobby Rydell recorded and released a version on their album Bobby Rydell/Chubby Checker. In 1961 it reached No. 21 on the Billboard Hot 100 singles chart, No. 3 in Canada, and No. 40 on the UK Singles Chart. It was issued on Cameo Parkway C205.

== Certifications ==
=== Bobby Helms version ===
Certifications for "Jingle Bell Rock" by Bobby Helms
Region	Certification	Certified units/sales
Australia (ARIA)	2× Platinum	140,000^{‡}
Denmark (IFPI Danmark)	2× Platinum	180,000^{‡}
Germany (BVMI)	Platinum	600,000^{‡}
Italy (FIMI)	2× Platinum	200,000^{‡}
New Zealand (RMNZ)	2× Platinum	60,000^{‡}
Portugal (AFP)	Platinum	10,000^{‡}
Spain (Promusicae)	Gold	25,000^{‡}
United Kingdom (BPI)	3× Platinum	1,800,000^{‡}
Streaming
Greece (IFPI Greece)	2× Platinum	4,000,000^{†}
^{‡} Sales+streaming figures based on certification alone.^{†} Streaming-only figures based on certification alone.

=== Hall & Oates version ===
Certifications for "Jingle Bell Rock" by Hall & Oates
Region	Certification	Certified units/sales
Australia (ARIA)	Platinum	70,000^{‡}
New Zealand (RMNZ)	Platinum	30,000^{‡}
Portugal (AFP)	Gold	12,000^{‡}
United Kingdom (BPI)	Gold	400,000^{‡}
^{‡} Sales+streaming figures based on certification alone.
