= Harmony Grass =

- The front cover of their 1969 album This Is Us. Clockwise from top left: Ray Brown, Brian Hudson, Kenny Rowe, Tony Harding, Bill Castle, Tony Rivers

Background information
- Also known as: Tony Rivers & the Castaways (1960–1968)
- Origin: UK
- Genres: Pop
- Years active: 1968–1970
- Label: RCA Records

Harmony Grass were a British sunshine pop group. The group was formed in Essex in October 1968 by previous members of Tony Rivers & the Castaways. As Harmony Grass, they had their first and only hit in 1969 with "Move in a Little Closer, Baby".

== History ==
=== Tony Rivers & the Castaways ===
Harmony Grass began as Tony Rivers & the Castaways, that had been formed in 1960. Originally fronted by Bobby Rio, he was replaced by Tony Rivers in late 1961 after being hired by bassist Ray Brown. Their first studio recordings consisted of the lineup of Tony Rivers (vocals), Ray Brown (bass), Vic Larkins (guitar), Mickey Johnson (guitar) and Brian Talbot (drums) which resulted in their first two singles.

Larkins left the band shortly after and worked at a Barking Power Station, and soon after Johnson followed; they were replaced by John Lyons and Rick Westwood, Westwood left after a few weeks to join The Tremeloes and was replaced by Steve Scott. The lineup changed again and by 1963/1964 the lineup was Rivers, Brown, Lyons and new members Tony Harding (guitar), Kenny Rowe (backing vocals) and Brian Hudson (drums).

By 1967, the band was now Rivers and Brown with three members hired from another band The Sugarbeats, Martin Shear (backing vocals), John Perry (guitar) and Geoff Swettenham (drums), who later brought his brother Pete Swettenham on guitar. Perry and the Swettenham brothers left the band a few months later and formed Grapefruit. Former members Tony Harding, Kenny Rowe and Brian Hudson all rejoined the band, along with guitarist Tom Marshall.

In total, the Castaways recorded six singles for EMI from 1963 to 1966.

=== Harmony Grass ===
In October 1968, the band were wanting to change their style, and felt that their long name was possibly holding them back from selling records. They changed their name to Harmony Grass. Tony Harding left the band and was replaced by Tony Ferguson.

They signed to RCA Records about a year after they formed, and their single "Move in a Little Closer" hit No. 24 on the UK Singles Chart in January 1969. The song took five takes and five vocal arrangements, and used an orchestra that featured Clem Cattini on drums. They released one album, This Is Us, in 1969, on the RCA label, and performed in the UK, including at London's Marquee Club.

Brian Hudson had left before the name change and was replaced by Bill Castle, who was not in Harmony Grass for a long time but did play drums on "Move in a Little Closer"; he was replaced by Hudson again midway through recording their album.

In July/August 1970, Rivers played his last gig with Harmony Grass before leaving, his replacement was Joe Williams. By late 1970, Harmony Grass had disbanded.

== Later careers ==
Band members Tony Ferguson (guitar) and Kenny Rowe (bass) both joined Capability Brown in 1973.

Tony Rivers later appeared on albums by Brian Bennett (of The Shadows), Steve Harley & Cockney Rebel, and Roger Daltrey. Rivers had severe Alzheimer's and, after moving into intensive care in August 2024, died on 30 March 2026, aged 85.

Tom Marshall worked with Episode Six, Sparrow, Liquid Gold, Bucks Fizz and Elaine Paige; he was married to Sheila Carter-Dimmock from Episode Six for some time and while a touring member of Bucks Fizz, was badly injured when their touring coach crashed on 11 December 1984.

Brian Hudson became the tour manager for The Nolans and married Linda Nolan in 1981. Hudson died of cancer on 21 September 2007 aged 60.

Tony Harding died in Skegness on 19 December 2025.

== Members ==
The members of Harmony Grass in alphabetical order

- Ray Brown — bass
- Bill Castle — drums
- Tony Ferguson — guitar
- Tony Harding — guitar (died 2025)
- Brian Hudson — drums (died 2007)
- Tom Marshall — guitar, piano
- Tony Rivers — vocals (died 2026)
- Kenny Rowe — backing vocals (died 2025)

== Discography ==
=== Albums ===
Year	Title	UK
1970	This Is Us	—

=== Singles ===
Year	Title	UK	Notes
1968	"Move In a Little Closer, Baby"	24	
1969	"I Remember"	—	
1969	"First Time Loving"	—	
1969	"Good Thing / What A Groovy Day"	—	
1970	"Cecilia"	—	
1970	"Te Lo Ricordi / Summer Dreaming"	—	
1970	"Mrs. Richie"	—	
1970	"Stand On Your Own Two Feet"	—	
1971	"Listen Here / Stand On Your Own Two Feet"	—	Featuring Brian Auger and the Trinity
