= I'll Never Dance Again =

Single by Bobby Rydell
- B-side: "Gee, It's Wonderful"
- Released: 1962
- Genre: Pop
- Length: 2:31
- Label: Cameo Records
- Songwriters: Barry Mann & Mike Anthony

Bobby Rydell singles chronology
"I've Got Bonnie" (1962)	"I'll Never Dance Again" (1962)	"The Cha-Cha-Cha" (1962)

"I'll Never Dance Again" is a song released in 1962 by Bobby Rydell. The song spent 12 weeks on the Billboard Hot 100 chart, peaking at No. 14, while reaching No. 4 in India, No. 6 in Australia, and No. 29 on Canada's CHUM Hit Parade.

The song was recorded two years later by Freddie and the Dreamers on their 1964 album You Were Mad for Me, and by Herman's Hermits on the UK version of their eponymous debut album, released in 1965.

== Chart performance ==
Chart (1962)	Peak position
US Billboard Hot 100	14
India - The Voice	4
Australia - Music Maker	6
Canada - CHUM Hit Parade	29
