= Move in a Little Closer, Baby =

1968 song performed by Harmony Grass

"Move in a Little Closer"
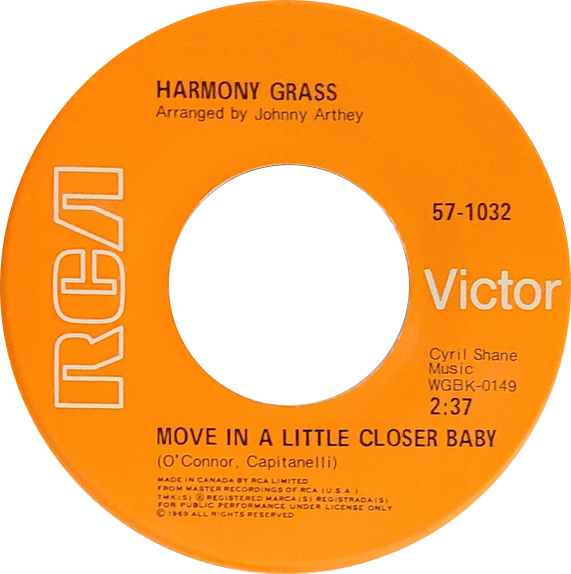
- Side A of the Canadian single

Single by Harmony Grass

from the album This Is Us
- B-side: "Happiness Is Toy Shaped"
- Released: 1968
- Genre: Pop
- Label: RCA Records
- Songwriters: O'Connor, Capitanelli
- Producer: Chris Andrews

Performance video
- "Move in a Little Closer Baby" (in Beat Club, 1969) by Harmony Grass on YouTube

"Move in a Little Closer, Baby" is a pop song, first recorded by Harmony Grass as "Move in a Little Closer." The song became an international hit for Cass Elliot in the spring of 1969.

Grass had recorded the song in 1968, and released it as a single. The song reached number 24 in the UK Singles Chart in January 1969. It was also released in Germany, Spain and Australia.

== Chart performance ==
Chart (1968–69)	Peak position
UK	24

== Cass Elliot version ==
"Move in a Little Closer, Baby"
- Side A of the Australian single

Single by Mama Cass Elliot

from the album Bubblegum, Lemonade, and...Something for Mama
- B-side: "All for Me"
- Released: March 1969
- Genre: Bubblegum pop
- Label: Dunhill Records
- Songwriters: O'Connor, Capitanelli
- Producer: Steve Barri

Mama Cass Elliot singles chronology
"California Earthquake" (1968)	"Move in a Little Closer, Baby" (1969)	"It's Getting Better" (1969)

Audio
- "Move in a Little Closer, Baby" by Cass Elliot on YouTube

=== Background ===
"Move in a Little Closer, Baby" was the first advance single from Cass Elliot's second solo album Bubblegum, Lemonade, and...Something for Mama. Elliot would recall recording "Move in..." "as a lark. I did all the background voices and it sounds like [Elliot's former group] the Mamas & the Papas. But I'm tired of being 'hit over the head with' the Mamas & Papas", referencing Dunhill Records displeasure with Elliot's shift of musical direction on her solo debut album. The sessions for Elliot's "Bubblegum, Lemonade..." album were produced by Dunhill's a&r vice-president Steve Barri, who would recall having Elliot record bubblegum music since "I wanted to capture who she was...this real fun-loving positive kind of person". Elliot would in 1971 recall that at Dunhill she'd been "forced to be so bubblegum that I'd stick to the floor when I walked": however Barri's contention was that: "We never recorded anything that she didn't want to do" while allowing that Elliot "wasn't too thrilled" with "Move in...". Elliot, who had been affronted by her first solo single "Dream a Little Dream of Me" facing UK chart competition from a rival version by Anita Harris, would allege that she had no awareness of the Harmony Grass original of "Move in..." when she recorded the song and was embarrassed to learn she'd unknowingly cut a cover version Elliot's version of the song peaked at number 58 on the U.S. Billboard Hot 100 and reached number 55 on the Pop chart and number 19 on the Adult Contemporary chart. It also reached number 34 in Australia.

=== Chart performance ===
Chart (1969)	Peak position
Australia KMR	34
Canada RPM Top Singles	55
Canada RPM Adult Contemporary	19
U.S. Billboard Hot 100	58
U.S. Billboard Adult Contemporary	32
U.S. Cash Box Top 100	59

== Other versions ==
"Move in a Little Closer Baby" has also been covered by The Bloomfields and the Four King Cousins.
