= Make Your Own Kind of Music =

1969 single by Cass Elliot

Single by Cass Elliot

from the album Make Your Own Kind of Music/It's Getting Better
- B-side: "Lady Love"
- Released: September 1969
- Studio: Western Recorders (Hollywood)
- Genre: Bubblegum music
- Length: 2:25
- Label: Dunhill
- Songwriters: Barry Mann; Cynthia Weil
- Producer: Steve Barri

Cass Elliot singles chronology
| "It's Getting Better" (1969) | "Make Your Own Kind of Music" (1969) | "New World Coming" (1970) |

"Make Your Own Kind of Music" is a song most famously recorded by American singer Cass Elliot and released in September 1969 by Dunhill Records. It was written by Barry Mann and Cynthia Weil, with production by Steve Barri. The song had been previously recorded in 1968 by the Will-O-Bees for the SGC label.

In the United States, Cass's version of "Make Your Own Kind of Music" was a Top 40 hit, peaking at number 36 on the Billboard Hot 100. Largely viewed as a commercial disappointment despite strong airplay on U.S. Top 40 radio stations in November 1969, the song found new life in the 2000s due to its use in TV shows such as Lost and the feature film Free Guy.

== Background ==
Elliot recorded "Make Your Own Kind of Music" after she had a hit in the summer of 1969 with "It's Getting Better", another Mann/Weil song and the second single from her second solo album, Bubblegum, Lemonade, and... Something for Mama. That album had been produced by Dunhill Records vice president of A&R Steve Barri, who said: "[Since Dunhill] didn't have much success with [the debut Cass Elliot solo album] Dream a Little Dream we wanted to get her back on the [upper] charts and we tried to find some commercial songs." Barri also attributed the bubblegum music focus of his output with Elliot to a desire "to capture who she was... this real fun-loving positive... person I couldn't imagine anybody... not loving."

In a September 1969 Melody Maker interview a week prior to the US release of the "Make Your Own Kind of Music" single, Elliot stated: "Bubblegum music is very pleasant to listen to... but it's like they say about Chinese food: half an hour after tasting it you are hungry again", although she did concede, "maybe [bubblegum] is what I am supposed to be doing [since] my voice is very light... I just can't sing heavy material". Elliot would be less easygoing in her 1971 summation of her 1968–1970 tenure with Dunhill Records, saying she had been "forced to be so bubblegum that I'd stick to the floor when I walked." Barri, while admitting—also in 1971—that "Cass was one artist I couldn't find the answer for," would maintain: "We never recorded anything that she didn't want to do."

Elliot also told Melody Maker that "It's Getting Better" was "musically... not quite what I want to be doing... It's a good recording for what it is, but you wouldn't exactly call it social commentary." "Make Your Own Kind of Music", while similar in structure to "It's Getting Better", could be considered social commentary: Steve Barri would rank "Make Your Own Kind of Music" in with "pop songs [that] really kind of say something". Released in October 1969, "Make Your Own Kind of Music" swiftly ascended the Hot 100 in Billboard, and in November 1969 Dunhill reissued Elliot's second solo album reformatted to include "Make Your Own Kind of Music", the album's title being changed to Make Your Own Kind of Music/It's Getting Better. Steve Barri considered "Make Your Own Kind of Music" to be a guaranteed Top Ten hit; the single would garner heavy radio airplay but comparatively meager sales, stalling at #36 on the Hot 100 ("Make Your Own Kind of Music" would reach #6 on the airplay driven Billboard Easy Listening chart).

The follow-up single to "Make Your Own Kind of Music": "New World Coming"—another Mann/ Weil song—was similarly a sugarcoated message song and would have similar soft chart impact—with a #42 Hot 100 peak—signaling Elliot's challenges in maintaining a profile as a current hitmaker, as the 1960s turned into the 1970s. Dunhill Records president Jay Lasker would say of the underperformance of "New World Coming": "The message here—at least to us—is that 'the message record has had it'. [Now] Mama Cass is going to do love songs." The follow-up to "New World Coming", "A Song That Never Comes", would be Elliot's final single to reach the Hot 100, spending two weeks at #99 in August 1970. Dunhill released Elliott's third solo album in October 1970, Mama's Big Ones, compiling seven of her eight Hot 100 singles plus some previously unreleased tracks, as her final solo album on the label. Subsequent to the one-off collaborative album Dave Mason & Cass Elliot on Blue Thumb, Dunhill announced in July 1970 that Elliot would reunite with her former bandmates for a final Mamas & Papas album, after which she would depart Dunhill to record for RCA Victor.

== Personnel ==
- Guitar: Ben Benay, Mike Deasy. Steel Guitar: Red Rhodes
- Bass: Joe Osborn
- Keyboards: Larry Knechtel
- Drums: Hal Blaine
- Percussion: Steve Barri, Phil Kaye
- Harmonica: Ben Benay

== Critical reception ==
In an August 14 2019 "Staff Picks" ranking of the 100 Best Songs of 1969 in Billboard, Elliot's "Make Your Own Kind of Music" was ranked at #89, with the evaluation: "Though just a modest hit, Elliot's ode to striking out on your own was a crucial evolution in self-referential pop. [In 1968] her debut album [had] stiffed, and... her three-week Vegas residency closed after a single awful performance. In this light, the sunshine pop of "Make Your Own Kind of Music"... sparkled even more defiantly."

== In popular culture ==
Elliot's recording of "Make Your Own Kind of Music" was featured prominently in the television show Lost, first appearing in the episode "Man of Science, Man of Faith", and was rated as one of Spin magazine's "Best Musical Moments From TV's Latest Golden Age".

Elliot's "Make Your Own Kind of Music" also has a prominent role in the 8th season of the American television show drama Dexter, being attributed to 'The Brain Surgeon' in an episode sharing the same name as the song, "Make Your Own Kind of Music".

After a viral mashup featuring "Make Your Own Kind of Music" with a clip from the 2022 film The Unbearable Weight of Massive Talent became a meme on TikTok, the song was used in 46,000 videos. It continued to go viral in TikTok trends throughout 2023. These trends were satirized on Saturday Night Live's December 2, 2023 episode, with Chloe Troast playing Cass, and Emma Stone as the song's recording producer.

== Chart performance ==
"Make Your Own Kind of Music" chart performance
| Chart (1969) | Peak position |
|---|---|
| Canada RPM Top Singles | 20 |
| Canada RPM Adult Contemporary | 7 |
| US Billboard Hot 100 | 36 |
| US Adult Contemporary | 6 |
| US Cash Box Top 100 | 25 |

== Certifications ==
Certifications for Make Your Own Kind of Music
| Region | Certification | Certified units/sales |
|---|---|---|
| United Kingdom (BPI) | Silver | 200,000^{‡} |
^{‡} Sales+streaming figures based on certification alone.

== Remixes ==
In 1997 a remixed version by Carmen Cacciatore and Louie "Balo" Guzman titled the "Yum Club Mix" was released officially on the re-released single "California Dreamin'" by The Mamas & the Papas. There was also a 12" vinyl promo-only release to promote the soundtrack for the film Beautiful Thing, with four different versions: including Yum Club Mix (9:48), Yum Beats (3:12), Da Yum Flute Dub (7:11), and Mama Cass Mix (3:24). The Yum Club Mix was also featured on the 1997 dance compilation Dance Across the Universe (Part 1), released by Universal Records. This version would reach #11 on the Dance Club Songs chart in Billboard.

== Paloma Faith version ==
"Make Your Own Kind of Music"

Single by Paloma Faith

from the album The Architect
- Released: 19 March 2018
- Length: 2:43
- Label: Sony
- Songwriters: Barry Mann; Cynthia Weil
- Producers: TMS; Phil Cook

Paloma Faith singles chronology
| "Lullaby" (2018) | "Make Your Own Kind of Music" (2018) | "Warrior" (2018) |

Audio video
- "Make Your Own Kind of Music" on YouTube

"Make Your Own Kind of Music" became a top 30 hit in the United Kingdom in 2018 via a cover version by Paloma Faith. It was announced on 1 February 2018 that Škoda Auto had commissioned Faith to record a version of "Make Your Own Kind of Music" to serve as jingle for an ad campaign to launch the Karoq, Škoda's new compact crossover SUV. Faith said: "The reality of Škoda is it was the car people took the piss out of you for having...That's how they enticed me in really, it was like that thing or person who people tease for being who they are but is now celebrated for being who they are." Faith subsequently introduced "Make Your Own Kind of Music" in concert, with the statement that she "doesn't usually approve of celebrity endorsements for products, but felt that Škoda was a brand worth celebrating due to how it's gradually become more respected over the years."

The track was made available for streaming as of 2 March 2018, with a promotional video made available 20 March 2018, and a year-long television ad campaign featuring a 60 second edit of the video inaugurated on 24 March 2018.The video "follows Paloma through a series of flashbacks as she fights to make it in the music industry. It depicts her struggling to fit in as a young child to performing to empty pubs, to an iconic moment early in her career where she rebukes a music executive for not listening to her sing. The flashbacks are juxtaposed with images of her now as she enjoys chart-topping success and a new period in her life as a mother." (Faith had given birth to her first child in December 2016.)

"Make Your Own Kind of Music" debuted on the UK chart dated 19 April 2018 at No. 59, to enter the top 40 at No. 28 on the chart dated 10 May 2018. The track spent only that one week in the top 40, and its typical ranking during its ten week chart tenure was between No. 43 and No. 49. However, the track was certified gold for sales and streams of 400,000 units. Included in the tracklist of Faith's fourth studio album The Architect, on sites such as Spotify and Apple Music as of 20 April 2018, "Make Your Own Kind of Music" was officially added to the album's tracklist on its 16 November 2018 re-release. Labeled The Zeitgist Edition, this re-release also added "Lullaby" to the tracks on the original album.

=== Charts ===
"Make Your Own Kind of Music" (Paloma Faith version) chart performance
| Chart (2018) | Peak position |
|---|---|
| Scottish Singles Sales (Official Charts) | 8 |
| UK Singles (Official Charts) | 28 |
| UK Singles Downloads (Official Charts) | 4 |

=== Certifications ===
"Make Your Own Kind of Music" (Paloma Faith version) certifications
| Region | Certification | Certified units/sales |
|---|---|---|
| United Kingdom (BPI) | Gold | 400,000^{‡} |
^{‡} Sales+streaming figures based on certification alone.

== Other versions ==
In 1972, Barbra Streisand's concert album Live Concert at the Forum featured the medley "Sing"/ "Make Your Own Kind of Music". Released as a single, it reached No. 94 on the Billboard Hot 100, and No. 28 on the magazine's Easy Listening chart. On her 1973 album Barbra Streisand...And Other Musical Instruments, Streisand sings "Make Your Own Kind of Music" in a medley with "Sing".

Bobby Sherman recorded a cover of the song on his 1970 album Here Comes Bobby.
