= Bobby Rydell =

American singer and teen idol (1942–2022)

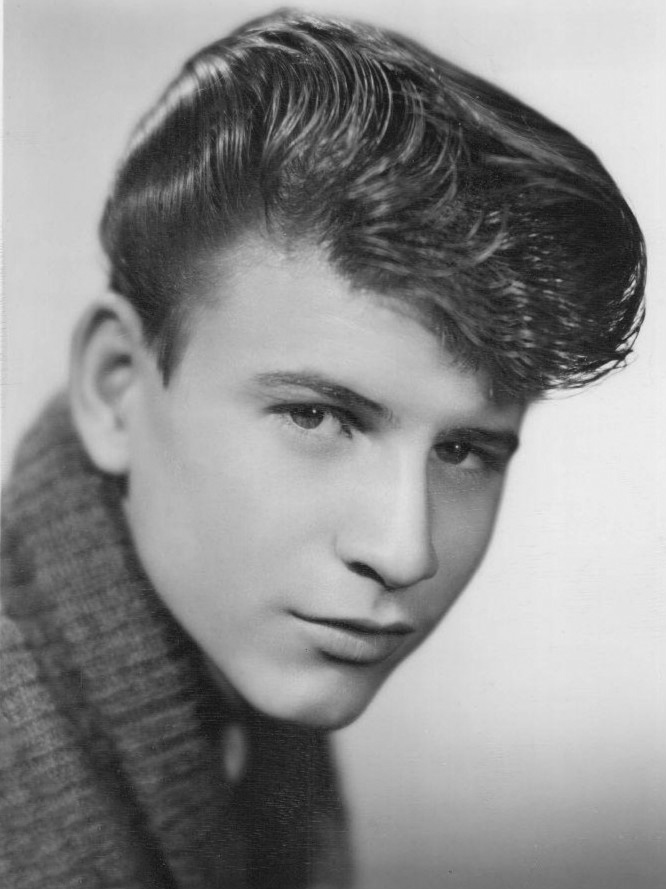
- Rydell in a 1960 publicity photo
- Born: Robert Louis Ridarelli; April 26, 1942; Philadelphia, Pennsylvania, U.S.
- Died: April 5, 2022 (aged 79); Abington Township, Montgomery County, Pennsylvania, U.S.
- Occupations: Singer, actor
- Years active: 1950–2022
- Spouses: Camille Quattrone (m. 1968; died 2003) Linda Hoffman (m. 2009)
- Children: 2
- Musical career
- Genres: Traditional pop, rock and roll, doo-wop
- Labels: Cameo-Parkway, Capitol, Reprise, (U.S.); Columbia (U.K.)
- Formerly of: The Golden Boys
- Website: bobbyrydell.com

Robert Louis Ridarelli (April 26, 1942 – April 5, 2022), known by the stage name Bobby Rydell (/raɪˈdɛl/ ry-DEL), was an American singer and actor who mainly performed rock and roll and traditional pop music. In the early 1960s, he was considered a teen idol. His best-known songs include "Wildwood Days", "Wild One" and "Volare" (cover of an Italian song by Domenico Modugno, "Nel blu, dipinto di blu”); in 1963 he appeared in the musical film Bye Bye Birdie.

In the 1980s, he joined a trio called The Golden Boys, with fellow former teen idols Frankie Avalon and Fabian Forte. He continued to tour up until his death in 2022.

== Early life ==
Rydell was born on April 26, 1942 and was the son of Jennie Ridarelli (née Sapienza) and Adrio "Al" Ridarelli. Both of his parents were of Italian descent. He grew up in the Lower Moyamensing neighborhood of South Philadelphia.

As a child, he mimicked the singers he saw on television, and at the age of seven his father took him around the clubs of Philadelphia, asking if he could sing and do some impersonations. By the time he was eight, his reputation led to an appearance on a talent show on the national television series,TV Teen Club. He won the contest, and the show's presenter, Paul Whiteman, recruited him into the cast, where he remained for several years. It was here that his name was anglicised to Bobby Rydell.

== Career ==
Rydell played in several bands in the Philadelphia area. As a 14-year-old he was the drummer for the Emanons (NoName spelled backward) which included his childhood friend Pat Azzara on guitar. Azzara later assumed the stage name Pat Martino, and went on to achieve recognition as one of the preeminent jazz guitarists of all time. Another band was Rocco and the Saints, in which he sang and played drums. After releasing three unsuccessful singles for small companies, he signed a recording contract with Cameo Records. This was run by Bernie Lowe, who had been the pianist accompanying him on TV Teen Club. After a couple of flops, "Kissin' Time" made the charts in 1959. In May 1960, Rydell toured Australia with The Everly Brothers, Billy "Crash" Craddock, Marv Johnson, The Champs, The Crickets, and Lonnie Lee.

His second success was "We Got Love". The album of the same name, his first, sold a million copies and obtained gold disc status. "Wild One" was followed with "Little Bitty Girl" which was his second million-selling single. He continued releasing hit songs with "Swingin' School" backed by "Ding-A-Ling" and "Volare" later in 1960, which also sold over a million copies. It is estimated he sold over 25 million records in total.

In 1961, he performed at the Copacabana in New York City, where he was the youngest performer to headline at the nightclub. In February 1961, he appeared at the Festival du Rock at the Palais des Sports de Paris in Paris, France.

Rydell's success and prospects led his father, Adrio, a foreman at the Electro-Nite Carbon Company in Philadelphia, to resign in 1961 after 22 years to become his son's road manager.

In 1963, Rydell released the song "Wildwood Days", which reached Number 17 on the Billboard Hot 100 chart and remained there for nine weeks. A mural on the Wildwood, New Jersey, boardwalk, painted in 2014, honors Rydell, whose song placed the community in the national spotlight.

That same year, Rydell portrayed Hugo Peabody in the film version of Bye Bye Birdie, also starring Ann-Margret and Dick Van Dyke. The original stage production of Bye Bye Birdie had no real singing role for the character of Hugo, but the movie script was rewritten specifically to expand the part for Rydell. In 2011, Sony Pictures digitally restored the film. Rydell and Ann-Margret were in attendance at the restoration premiere in Beverly Hills, hosted by the Academy of Motion Picture Arts and Sciences.

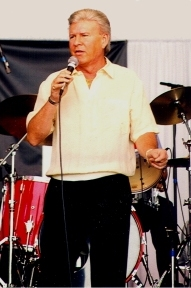
Rydell performing in 1998

During the 1960s, Rydell had numerous hit records on the Billboard Hot 100 chart. His recording career earned him 34 Top 100 hits, placing him in the top five artists of his era (Billboard). They included his most popular successes: "Wild One" (his highest scoring single, at number 2), "Volare" (number 4), "Swingin' School" (number 5), "Kissin' Time" (number 11), "Sway" (number 14), "I've Got Bonnie" (number 18), and "The Cha-Cha-Cha" (number 10). His last major chart success was "Forget Him", which reached number 4 on the Hot 100 in January 1964. The song, written by Tony Hatch, was his fifth and final gold disc winner.

Rydell left Cameo-Parkway Records later in 1964 and signed with Capitol Records. By that point, the British Invasion had arrived and acts such as Rydell suffered a dramatic decline in popularity. Bands such as The Beatles became more popular, and Rydell unknowingly inspired John Lennon and Paul McCartney to write "She Loves You", a song which paved the way for their success in the US.

During that time, he performed on many television programs, including The Red Skelton Show, where a recurring role as Zeke Kadiddlehopper, Clem Kadiddlehopper's younger cousin, was written for him by Skelton. He also appeared on The Danny Thomas Show, Jack Benny, Joey Bishop, and The George Burns Show. He was a regular on The Milton Berle Show and was a panelist on To Tell the Truth in 1964. On October 6, 1964, he made a guest appearance on the episode "Duel" of the television series Combat!. It was Rydell's first dramatic acting role.

In 1963, Rydell starred in an unsold television pilot called Swingin' Together produced by Desilu Productions, which featured him as the frontman for a four-piece rock 'n roll band seeking their big break. Also during that time, Rydell served in the 103rd Engineer Battalion of the Pennsylvania Army National Guard.

In January 1968, it was announced in the UK music magazine NME that Rydell had signed a long-term recording contract with Reprise Records. He continued to perform in nightclubs, supper clubs and Las Vegas venues throughout the 1970s and 1980s, but his career was hampered by the refusal by ABKCO Records to reissue Rydell's Cameo-Parkway catalog, so it was completely unavailable until 2005 (although he did re-record his hits in 1995 for K-tel Records). He had one more hit after 1965, a disco re-recording of "Sway", which reached the Billboard Easy Listening chart in 1976.

Rydell continued to tour for the remainder of his life, often with Frankie Avalon and Fabian Forte, performing under the name "The Golden Boys". His autobiography was published in 2016.

== Personal life ==
Rydell was married to his first wife, Camille Quattrone Ridarelli, for 35 years, from 1968 until her death in 2003. They had two children. He married Linda Hoffman in 2009. Rydell was a longtime resident of Penn Valley, Pennsylvania, and lived in the same house from 1963 to 2019 before he resided in Blue Bell, Pennsylvania until his death.

Rydell served in the U.S. National Guard, and began his service in 1964 with two months of basic training at Fort Dix.

The street on which he was born in Philadelphia was renamed Bobby Rydell Boulevard, in his honor. In 2023, it was announced that a statue of Rydell would be erected in Wildwood, New Jersey, through the Bobby Rydell Foundation organized by his family.

=== Health and death ===
Rydell cancelled a 2012 Australia tour because his health had deteriorated significantly and he was in need of urgent major surgery. On July 9, 2012, he underwent a double organ transplant, to replace his liver and one kidney, at Thomas Jefferson University in his hometown of Philadelphia. In January 2013, six months after the double transplant surgery, Rydell returned to the stage in Las Vegas for a three-night engagement to a sold-out audience. He continued to perform internationally and returned to tour Australia in 2014.

Rydell died from complications of pneumonia at Jefferson Abington Hospital on April 5, 2022, three weeks before his 80th birthday.

== Media ==
In the Broadway musical drama Grease, its film adaptation, and the film's sequel Grease 2, the high school was named "Rydell High" after Rydell.

In 2000, in the book The Beatles Anthology (p. 96), Paul McCartney said:

John [Lennon] and I wrote "She Loves You" together. There was a Bobby Rydell song out at the time and, as often happens, you think of one song when you write another. We'd planned an "answering song" where a couple of us would sing "she loves you" and the other ones would answer "yeah yeah". We decided that was a crummy idea but at least we then had the idea of a song called "She Loves You". So we sat in the hotel bedroom for a few hours and wrote it—John and I, sitting on twin beds with guitars.

No specific song title is given in The Beatles Anthology, but Bob Spitz writes in The Beatles: The Biography that McCartney originally modeled "She Loves You" on the Rydell "answering song" called "Swingin' School", and not "Forget Him", as is commonly cited.

In the Oscar-winning film Green Book (2018), Rydell is portrayed in the opening scenes by actor Von Lewis.

== Albums discography ==
Year	Album	Peak chart positions		Record Label
Year	Album	US Billboard	US Cashbox	Record Label
1959	We Got Love	—	—	Cameo Records
1960	Bobby Sings, Bobby Swings	—	—	Cameo Records
1960	Bobby Rydell/Chubby Checker	7	6	Cameo Records
1961	Bobby Rydell Salutes "The Great Ones"	—	49	Cameo Records
1961	Rydell at the Copa	56	—	Cameo Records
1961	Bobby's Biggest Hits	12	24	Cameo Records
1961	Biggest Hits Volume 2	61	48	Cameo Records
1962	An Era Reborn	—	—	Cameo Records
1962	All The Hits	88	35	Cameo Records
1963	All The Hits Volume 2	—	—	Cameo Records
1963	Wild (Wood) Days	—	—	Cameo Records
1963	Bye Bye Birdie	—	—	Cameo Records
1963	The Bobby Rydell Show	—	—	Cameo Records
1964	The Top Hits of 1963	67	69	Cameo Records
1964	Forget Him	98	79	Cameo Records
1965	Somebody Loves You	—	—	Capitol Records
1976	Born With a Smile	—	—	P.I.P. Records
1976	The Best of Bobby Rydell	—	—	London Records
2003	A Philadelphia Christmas	—	—	BCI Eclipse Records
"—" denotes releases that did not chart.

== Singles discography ==
Release date	Title	B-side From same album as A-side except where indicated	Chart positions					Album
Release date	Title	B-side From same album as A-side except where indicated	US Billboard	US AC	US R&B	Canada CHUM/ RPM	UK	Album
1959	"Dream Age"	"Fatty Fatty"						non-LP tracks
1959	"Please Don't Be Mad"	"Makin' Time" (non-LP track)						Bobby Sings, Bobby Swings
1959	"All I Want Is You"	"For You, For You" (non-LP track)						We Got Love
1959	"Kissin' Time"	"You'll Never Tame Me" (from Bobby's Biggest Hits)	11		29	5		We Got Love
1959	"We Got Love" b/w		6			5		We Got Love
1959		"I Dig Girls"	46					Bobby's Biggest Hits
1960	"Wild One" b/w		2		10	2	7	Bobby's Biggest Hits
1960		"Little Bitty Girl"	19			2		Bobby's Biggest Hits
1960	"Swingin' School" b/w		5			2	44	Bobby's Biggest Hits
1960		"Ding-A-Ling"	18			2		Bobby's Biggest Hits
1960	"Volare"	"I'd Do It Again"	4		9	3	22	Bobby Sings, Bobby Swings
1960	"Sway" b/w		14			12	12	Bobby's Biggest Hits
1960		"Groovy Tonight"	70					Bobby's Biggest Hits
1961	"Good Time Baby" b/w		11			6	42	Bobby's Biggest Hits Vol. 2
1961		"Cherie" (non-LP track)	54			11		Bobby's Biggest Hits Vol. 2
1961	"That Old Black Magic" b/w		21			13		Bobby Rydell Salutes the Great Ones
1961		"Don't Be Afraid (To Fall in Love)"				13		Bobby's Biggest Hits Vol. 2
1961	"The Fish"	"The Third House" (non-LP track)	25			8		Bobby's Biggest Hits Vol. 2
1961	"I Wanna Thank You" b/w		21			11		18 Golden Hits
1961		"The Door to Paradise"	85			11		18 Golden Hits
1961	"Teach Me to Twist" †	"Swingin' Together"	109			36	45	Bobby Rydell/Chubby Checker
1961	"Jingle Bell Rock" †	"Jingle Bells Imitations"	21			3	40	Bobby Rydell/Chubby Checker
1962	"I've Got Bonnie" b/w		18			5		All the Hits
1962		"Lose Her"	69			5		Bobby's Biggest Hits Vol. 2
1962	"Fatty, Fatty"	"Happy, Happy"						non-LP tracks
1962	"I'll Never Dance Again" b/w		14			29		Bobby's Biggest Hits Vol. 2
1962		"Gee, It's Wonderful"	109			29		Bobby's Biggest Hits Vol. 2
1962	"The Cha-Cha-Cha"	"The Best Man Cried"	10			11		Bobby's Biggest Hits Vol. 2
1963	"Steel Pier" one-sided promotional single							Wild[wood] Days
1963	"Butterfly Baby"	"Love is Blind" (non-LP track)	23			26		All The Stars' Biggest Hits Vol. 2 (various Cameo/Parkway artists)
1963	"Wildwood Days" b/w		17			21		Wild[wood] Days
1963		"Will You Be My Baby"	114					non-LP tracks
1963	"The Woodpecker Song" b/w							non-LP tracks
1963		"Little Queenie"						non-LP tracks
1963	"Let's Make Love Tonight"	"Childhood Sweetheart"	98			26		non-LP tracks
1963	"Forget Him"	"A Message from Bobby"	4			3		Top Hits of 1963 (bonus 7" single)
1964	"Forget Him" b/w		4	3			13	Forget Him
1964		"Love, Love Go Away"						Forget Him
1964	"Make Me Forget"	"Little Girl, You've Had a Busy Day" (non-LP track)	43			28		Forget Him
1964	"A World Without Love"	"Our Faded Love"	80			2		non-LP tracks
1964	"I Just Can't Say Goodbye"	"Two is the Loneliest Number"	94			44		non-LP tracks
1965	"Diana"	"Stranger in the World"	98	23		12		Somebody Loves You
1965	"Voce De La Notte"	"Ciao, Ciao Bambino" (non-LP track)						Forget Him
1965	"Side Show"	"The Joker"						non-LP tracks
1965	"When I See That Girl of Mine"	"It Takes Two"						non-LP tracks
1965	"The Word for Today"	"Roses in the Snow"						non-LP tracks
1966	"Not You"	"She Was the Girl"						non-LP tracks
1966	"Open for Business as Usual"	"You Gotta Enjoy Joy"						non-LP tracks
1968	"The Lovin' Things"	"That's What I Call Livin'"						non-LP tracks
1968	"The River is Wide"	"Absence Makes the Heart Grow Fonder"						non-LP tracks
1968	"Every Little Bit Hurts"	"Time and Changes"						non-LP tracks
1970	"It Must Be Love"	"Chapel on the Hill"						non-LP tracks
1973	"California Sunshine"	"Honey Buns"						non-LP tracks
1973	"Everything Seemed Better (When I Was Younger)"	"Sunday Son"						non-LP tracks
1976	"Sway" (Disco Version)	"Feels Good"		27				Born with a Smile
1976	"You're Not the Only Girl for Me"	"Give Me Your Answer"						Born with a Smile
1977	"It's Getting Better"	"The Singles Scene"						Born with a Smile
2022	“Sway” (feat. Tommy Cono							Sway
2022	“Wild One” (feat. Tommy Cono)							Wild One

† Chubby Checker and Bobby Rydell

- b/w = "backed with"

== Selected filmography ==
- Bye Bye Birdie (1963)
- Combat!: The Duel (1964)
- Marco Polo Junior Versus the Red Dragon (1972)
- That Lady from Peking (1975)
- Mr. Rock 'n' Roll: The Alan Freed Story (1999)

=== Bibliography ===
- Rydell, Bobby (2016). Bobby Rydell: Teen Idol on the Rocks. With Allan Slutsky. Doctor Licks Publishing. ISBN 978-0-9973851-0-6.

== See also ==
- List of people from Philadelphia
- History of Italian Americans in Philadelphia
- List of acts who appeared on American Bandstand
- List of Italian-American entertainers
- List of stage names
