= It's Getting Better =

- Solid center variant of the UK single

Single by Mama Cass

from the album Bubblegum, Lemonade, and... Something for Mama
- B-side: "Who's to Blame"
- Released: May 1969
- Genre: Sunshine pop
- Length: 3:00
- Label: Dunhill Records
- Songwriters: Barry Mann and Cynthia Weil
- Producer: Steve Barri

Mama Cass singles chronology
"Move in a Little Closer, Baby" (1969)	"It's Getting Better" (1969)	"Make Your Own Kind of Music" (1969)

"It's Getting Better" is a song written by Barry Mann and Cynthia Weil that was a sunshine pop hit single in 1969 for Mama Cass.

== Overview ==
The song describes the singer's satisfaction with a love relationship that is down-to-earth rather than extravagantly romantic, a subgenre of love song exemplified by the Jerome Kern/P. G. Wodehouse composition "Bill". Barry Mann and Cynthia Weil had previously written the similarly themed "He's Sure the Boy I Love", a hit for the Crystals in 1963.

The earliest evident recording of "It's Getting Better" was by the Vogues for their August 1968 album release Turn Around, Look at Me (Reprise Records). Also in 1968, the song was featured on the Leonard Nimoy album The Way I Feel (Dot Records) released that October. The first evident single release of "It's Getting Better" was by Pierre Lalonde on the Montréalais label Disco Prestige in September 1968 with the track's parent album: Introducing Peter Martin, being released that November.

In March 1969, the Will-O-Bees, a New York City-based trio (Janet Blossom, Steven Porter, and Robert Merchanthouse) who recorded a number of Mann-Weil compositions, had a single release of "It's Getting Better" on the SGC label (Screen Gems Columbia). Overall 1969 saw the release of several single versions of "It's Getting Better" but only Cass Elliot's was by an established artist at that time, the other versions being by Ronnie Buskirk, Freddie Gelfand, and P. K. Limited. The song has since been recorded and covered by many well-known artists around the world including UK singer and ex-cruise star Jane McDonald.

"It's Getting Better" has also been recorded by Richard Barnes, the Günter Kallmann (de) Chorus, Louise Morrissey, the Popinjays, Kevin Rowland and John & Anne Ryder. Bobby Rydell recorded the song for his 1976 album release Born With a Smile, his sole album released after 1964, and his version was issued as a single in 1977. Jane McDonald's rendition of "It's Getting Better" can be heard on her 2010 concert album Live at the London Palladium. A Swedish rendering of "It's Getting Better" by lyricist Stig Anderson entitled "Det Känns Bara Bättre" was cut by Anna-Lena Löfgren in 1970.

== Cass Elliot version ==
=== Background ===
"It's Getting Better" had been recorded by Cass Elliot for inclusion on her June 1969 album release Bubblegum, Lemonade, and... Something for Mama, which was produced by Steve Barri and arranged by Jimmie Haskell. The Wrecking Crew (James Burton on guitar, Hal Blaine on drums, Larry Knechtel on keyboards, and Joe Osborn on bass) — who had regularly backed the Mamas & the Papas — were among the instrumentalists on the album.

"It's Getting Better" was issued as the second advance single in May 1969 following the release that March of "Move in a Little Closer, Baby", a single reminiscent of the Mamas & the Papas sound which reached a Billboard Hot 100 peak of #58 (#30 Canada). Steve Barri would recall that "Move in a Little Closer, Baby" was "one [album track] [Elliot] wasn't too thrilled about...but she loved 'It's Getting Better'".

Elliot herself did convey reservations about "It's Getting Better", stating in a September 1969 Melody Maker interview that while pleased with the single was rising toward the UK Top Ten - "It shows I am being accepted on my own and that is something I've worried about ever since I left the Mamas & Papas" - "musically, though, it's not quite what I want to be doing. It doesn't satisfy me, It's a good recording for what it is, but you wouldn't exactly call it social commentary and musically it's not very complicated." Elliot further told Melody Maker - regarding "It's Getting Better" or perhaps the overall focus of its parent album - "Bubblegum music is very pleasant to listen to...but it's like they say about Chinese food: half an hour after tasting it you are hungry again", although she did concede "maybe [bubblegum] is what I am supposed to be doing [since] my voice is very light...I just can't sing heavy material". Elliot would be less easygoing in her 1971 summation of her 1968-1970 tenure with Dunhill Records, saying she had been "forced to be so bubblegum that I'd stick to the floor when I walked."

A #13 Easy Listening hit, "It's Getting Better" peaked at #30 in August 1969 during what was then considered an unusually lengthy 19-week run on Billboard's Hot 100. Only five other 1969 releases had longer chart runs on the Hot 100. The single's regional success was staggered, and it reached the Top Ten in several markets, ranking as high as #2 in Minneapolis-Saint Paul and San Diego. Its estimated US sales were 500,000 copies.

Cass Elliot made her first solo appearance on American Bandstand belatedly promoting "It's Getting Better" on its broadcast of November 8, 1969.

Elliot's "It's Getting Better" had a more pronounced chart impact in the UK, reaching #8 in October 1969 and selling almost 100,000 copies. The single bested the UK chart performance of Elliot's signature song, "Dream a Little Dream of Me" (#11), which had lost some popularity to a rival version by Anita Harris. In Ireland, where "Dream a Little Dream of Me" had reached #13, "It's Getting Better" reached #3.

"Dream a Little Dream of Me" and "It's Getting Better" would be Elliot's only charting singles in the British Isles. In the US, "It's Getting Better" was the fourth of Elliot's seven solo Billboard Hot 100 appearances and her second Top 40 hit after "Dream a Little Dream of Me".

In Australia, Cass Elliott's "It's Getting Better" charted concurrently with a version by Paul Jones, these singles peaking at respectively #53 and #52. Produced by Jones himself and arranged by Tony Visconti, the Paul Jones version was featured on his album Inside My Music Box and was released concurrently as a single with the Cass Elliott version in both the UK and Ireland without reaching the chart in either territory.

In the wake of the success of "It's Getting Better", Elliot's next two singles were recordings of Barry Mann-Cynthia Weil compositions: "Make Your Own Kind of Music" — which like "It's Getting Better" had been recorded by the Will-O-Bees in 1968 — and a new song, "New World Coming". Although both songs are now considered soft rock classics, their original chart success was fairly mild: "Make Your Own Kind of Music" peaked at #36 (Elliot's third and final solo Top 40 appearance) (#20 Canada), and "New World Coming" peaked at #42 (#22 Canada).

In 2011, Cass Elliot's "It's Getting Better" was employed in a television advertisement for Nestea.

The song was also featured in Season 4 Episode 8 of Lost, "Meet Kevin Johnson".

=== Chart performance ===
==== Weekly charts ====
Chart (1969)	Peak position
Canada Top Singles	30
Canada Adult Contemporary	5
Ireland	3
UK	8
US Billboard Hot 100	30
US Billboard Adult Contemporary	13
US Cash Box Top 100	35

==== Year-end charts ====
Chart (1969)	Rank
US Billboard Hot 100	55

== Cover versions ==
Bobby Rydell covered "It's Getting Better" on his 1976 LP Born with a Smile.
