= Something Better (Marianne Faithfull song) =

Single by Marianne Faithfull
- B-side: "Sister Morphine"
- Released: 1969
- Genre: Blues rock
- Label: Decca
- Songwriter(s): Barry Mann and Gerry Goffin
- Producer(s): Mick Jagger

Marianne Faithfull singles chronology
"Is This What I Get for Loving You?" (1967)	"Something Better" (1969)	"Dreaming My Dreams" (1975)

"Something Better" is a 1968 song by Marianne Faithfull written by Barry Mann and Gerry Goffin, arranged by Jack Nitzsche and produced by Mick Jagger.

The song, with Charlie Watts' introduction, appears on the 1968 The Rolling Stones Rock and Roll Circus video. "Something Better" was released as a single to promote the Decca singles compilation The World Of Marianne Faithfull, along with the B-side, "Sister Morphine".
