= Dream a Little Dream (Cass Elliot album) =

Studio album by Cass Elliot
- Released: October 1968
- Studio: Wally Heider, Hollywood, California
- Genre: Pop rock, psychedelic pop
- Label: Dunhill
- Producer: John Simon

Cass Elliot chronology
Dream a Little Dream (1968)	Bubblegum, Lemonade, and... Something for Mama (1969)

Dream a Little Dream is the debut solo album by American singer Cass Elliot immediately following the breakup of The Mamas & the Papas, though she was still billed as "Mama Cass" for this release. Capitalizing on the success of her first solo song as the album's title, it was released in October 1968 by Dunhill Records. The album was re-released by MCA Japan in 2001.

== Conception ==
Cass Elliot had agreed to a three-album deal as a solo artist with Dunhill Records less than a month after her split with the Mamas & the Papas.

Elliot chose John Simon as producer to help her steer the album. She had liked his work with The Band and found him to be the perfect person to work with. Both Elliot and Simon agreed that this would be her album and Simon was keen on allowing her the chance to choose her own material and to shine on her own.

== Overview ==
Elliot's original title for the album was going to be "In the Words of My Friends," called this because most of the songs she chose were written by friends and family.

The album itself is very much a concept album. While working with the Mamas & the Papas, Elliot felt severely limited in her desire to try different musical styles and took this album as that opportunity. The album contains touches of country, blues, rock, jazz, gospel, and bluegrass. When interviewed about the split, she told the Los Angeles Free Press, "I have a lot of things inside me to sing and I can't expect the others to wait around until I have got things out of my system. It's not that I wanted to leave the group, it's just that I wanted to do some things on my own."

The album was recorded in no more than ten days at Wally Heider's studio in Los Angeles. Instead of spending countless hours doing retakes as she had done with the Mamas & the Papas, Elliot recorded almost every song live. She was also keen to try, with the help of Simon, some experimental techniques, such as adding sound effects to the songs. "Dream a Little Dream of Me" was introduced at the beginning of the album with the sound of rain and a thunderstorm, and then with the static of someone changing a radio station. At the end of the song, a radio DJ announces that an ensuing earthquake has hit Los Angeles, seguing into "California Earthquake". Several other songs on the album lead into the next song to create the feeling that the same song is still playing.

John Sebastian's "Darling Be Home Soon" and Joni Mitchell's "Sisotowbell Lane" were both recorded, but ultimately not included on the album. Both tracks finally saw the light of day in 2005 when The Complete Cass Elliot Collection: 1968-71 was released; it featured all the material recorded for Dunhill on Elliot's first three solo albums, along with several other singles and unreleased rarities.

== Reception ==
Professional ratings
Review scores
Source	Rating
Allmusic	link

When Elliot presented the album to the studio heads of Dunhill, they were less than pleased, as they had expected her to produce material similar to her work with the Mamas & the Papas. They felt the album she had made was only marketable to a hippie audience, and thus went about marketing it toward the underground media. Elliot was displeased with this, feeling that the album really showed who she was and where she was at that moment, and that, had the album been promoted properly, it would have been a hit. Dunhill was also keen on keeping the "Mama Cass" name alive, hence the decision to bill her under that name, despite Elliot wanting to separate herself from that image as much as possible and to be known as Cass Elliot. Regardless of the clashes between Elliot and Dunhill, the album was a moderate success, selling over 150,000 copies and landing at No. 87 on the Billboard Top LPs chart.

To promote the album, Elliot had an interview with Rolling Stone magazine, followed by a then-extraordinary $40,000-a-week gig at Caesars Palace in Las Vegas.

== Track listing ==
1. "Dream a Little Dream of Me" (Wilbur Schwandt, Fabian Andre, Gus Kahn) (US Pop #12/US AC #2/UK #11) – 3:24
2. "California Earthquake" (John Hartford) (US Pop #67) – 2:42
3. "The Room Nobody Lives In" (John Sebastian) – 2:38
4. "Talkin' to Your Toothbrush" (John Simon) – 2:19
5. "Blues for Breakfast" (Richard Manuel) – 2:56
6. "You Know Who I Am" (Leonard Cohen) – 3:57
7. "Rubber Band" (Cyrus Faryar) – 3:17
8. "Long Time Loving You" (Stuart Scharf) – 1:59
9. "Jane, The Insane Dog Lady" (John Simon) – 2:00
10. "What Was I Thinking Of" (Leah Cohen) – 3:50
11. "Burn Your Hatred" (Graham Nash) – 2:25
12. "Sweet Believer" (Cyrus Faryar) – 4:55

== Personnel ==
- Cass Elliot – vocals
- Stephen Stills – guitar, vocals
- John Sebastian – guitar, harmonica
- James Burton – guitar, dobro
- Cyrus Faryar – guitar, ukulele
- Harvey Brooks – bass guitar
- Joe Osborn – bass guitar on "Dream a Little Dream of Me"
- Paul Harris – organ, piano
- John Simon – piano, arrangements
- Larry Knechtel – keyboards on "Dream a Little Dream of Me"
- Plas Johnson – saxophone
- Jim Gordon – drums
- Hal Blaine – drums on "Dream a Little Dream of Me"
- Reinol "Dino" Andino – congas
- Renais Faryar – vocals on "The Room Nobody Lives In" and "Rubber Band"
- Brenda Holloway – backing vocals on "You Know Who I Am"
- Philip Austin – voice
- Denny Doherty, Jill Gibson, John Phillips, Michelle Phillips, Scott McKenzie – backing vocals on "Dream a Little Dream of Me"
- The Blossoms – backing vocals on "Blues for Breakfast" and "You Know Who I Am"

== Charts ==
Chart (1968)	Peak position
US Billboard 200	87
US Cashbox Top 100 Albums	46
