= The Lamp of Childhood =

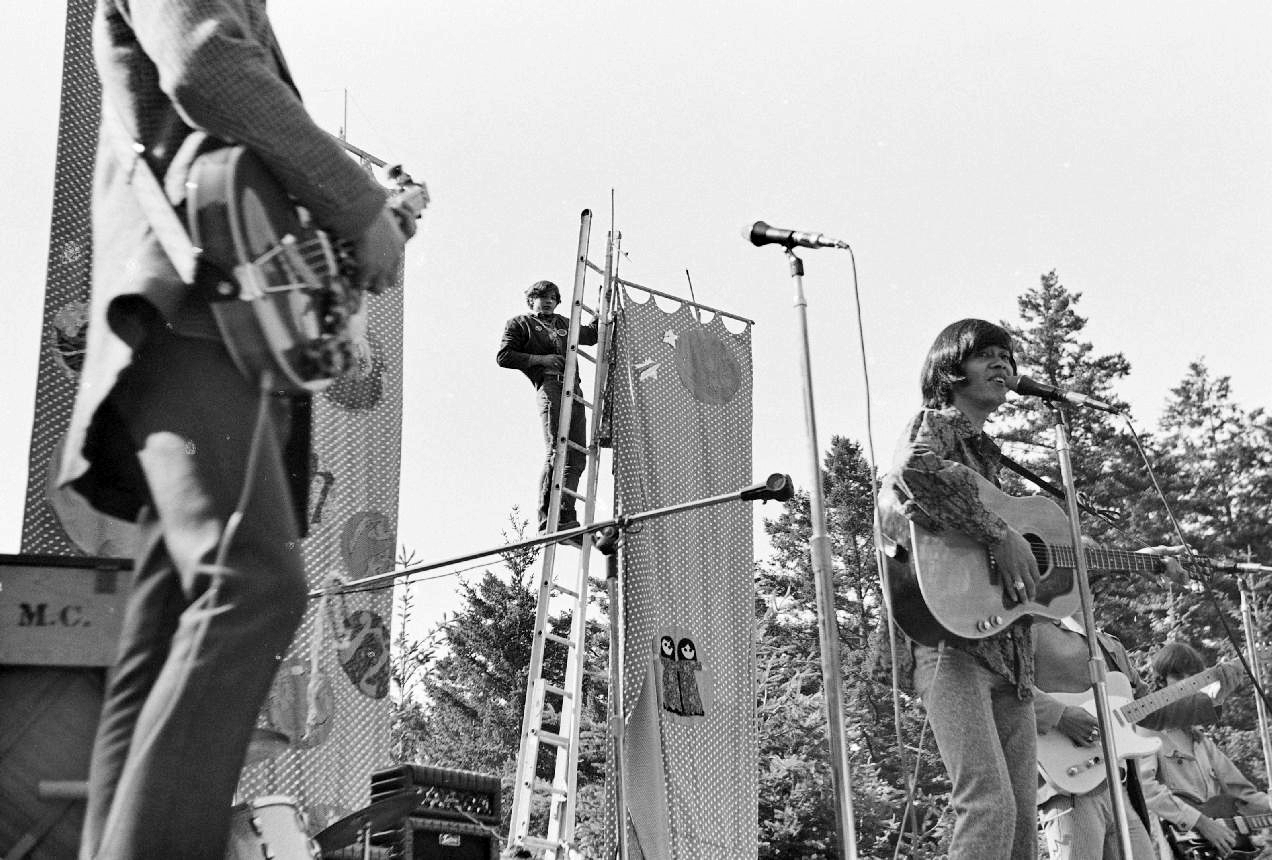
- The Lamp of Childhood plays at the Fantasy Fair and Magic Mountain Music Festival in June 1967, not long after the departure of the band's founder Jim Hendricks

Background information
- Genres: Folk rock
- Years active: 1966–1967
- Labels: Dunhill
- Past members: Jim Hendricks; Fred Olson; Mike Tani; Billy Mundi; Gabriel Mekler; Marty Tryon; John York

The Lamp of Childhood was a short-lived American folk rock band formed in Los Angeles, California in 1966. The band released three singles which failed to chart and disbanded in 1967, but had several notable members.

== History ==
The band was founded by Jim Hendricks, former member of the Mugwumps and husband of Cass Elliot. Elliot and Hendricks previously performed together in the New York-based folk trio the Big 3 in 1963–4. The lineup of the Lamp of Childhood featured Hendricks on vocals and guitar, lead guitarist Fred Olson, bassist Mike Tani (stage name of Michael Takamatsu), drummer Billy Mundi and recording session-only keyboardist Gabriel Mekler. The band released three singles after signing with Dunhill Records, beginning with a cover of Donovan's "Season of the Witch" in late 1966. Mundi departed the band after the initial release failed to garner sales and joined the Mothers of Invention. The band released additional singles with Marty Tryon on bass.

Hendricks left the band just before they appeared in their final performance, at the KFRC Fantasy Fair and Magic Mountain Music Festival, a seminal rock festival held in Marin County, California at the start of the Summer of Love. Hendricks was replaced in the group for the June 1967 festival by John York. In an interview, Tryon recalled that at the festival, the band had the misfortune of following two rousing performances by eventually famous groups on each day: The Doors finishing with "Light My Fire" on Saturday and the 5th Dimension ending with "Up, Up and Away" on Sunday.

Following the breakup of the band, York went on to join the Byrds, while Mekler reached fame as producer of hard rock group Steppenwolf's hit albums. Mundi left the Mothers of Invention to join the supergroup Rhinoceros, and Tryon worked as a studio musician and with the Smothers Brothers. Hendricks eventually established himself as a gospel and country artist based in Nashville, Tennessee.

== Recordings ==
The Lamp of Childhood released three singles:

- "Season of the Witch" / "You Can't Blame Me" (October 1966) – Dunhill 4051
- "First Time Last Time" / "Two O'Clock Morning" (March 1967) – Dunhill 4063
- "No More Running Around" / "Two O'Clock Morning" (1967) – Dunhill 4089
