= Dana LaCroix =

Canadian-American singer and songwriter (born 1966)

- Born: April 1, 1966 (age 59)
- Origin: Toronto, Ontario, Canada
- Genres: Folk rock, Roots rock
- Years active: 1986–present
- Website: danalacroix.com

Dana LaCroix (born April 1, 1966) is a Canadian-American singer and songwriter. She has released six roots and blues-influenced studio albums that incorporate elements of pop, roots-rock, country and folk music.

== Early life ==
LaCroix was born in Toronto, Ontario, to Naomi LaCroix (née: Tanaka), a registered nurse and Pat LaCroix, a Canadian musician and photographer who toured in the early sixties with The Halifax Three, a group he founded with Denny Doherty. She cites The Halifax Three as her earliest musical influence. She is the sister of the Canadian actress, Lisa LaCroix.

== Career ==
Touring since 1993, LaCroix has appeared in the United States and Canada, and toured nationally in Norway and Denmark, at venues including Midtfyns Festival, The Opera House, Regent Theater, and on national media including CBC’s Morningside, This Morning and Morning Edition, and The Artie Lange Show.

Early in her career LaCroix performed at Expo ’86 in Vancouver, British Columbia, Canada, with the Humber College Big Band and went on to work with Motown session guitarist, Leroy Emmanuel, and Norris Vines, formerly of The Platters, as a back-up and featured singer in a Motown tribute group.

She moved to New York City in 1989 where she performed and recorded with a 24-piece folk-rock band called The Poppies and others, before relocating to Copenhagen, Denmark in 1990. In Denmark she toured nationally with Danish-American guitarist, singer and songwriter, Paul Banks and took over for Champion Jack Dupree as the musical partner of Danish bluesman, Kenn Lending. She worked with Lending under the moniker Lending-LaCroix for two years, releasing a studio recording entitled "Down Home Blues" for Olufsen Records. and touring nationally in Denmark and Norway. Two of LaCroix's songs, Lonely Rooms and Pride, from her independent debut release, Pride, were included in Danish director, Nicolas Winding Refn's 2002 feature film mystery thriller, Fear X, starring John Turturro. The tracks were produced by Canadian producer, Rick Whitelaw. Lonely Rooms was originally released on LaCroix's freshman EP which was selected by Nashville's Performing Songwriter Magazine as a Top 12 Independent Recording in 1997.

LaCroix began working with Spanish bassist, songwriter and producer, Yadam Gonzales, soon thereafter, co-writing music for Eurovision Song Contest winner, Dutch pop star, "Hind’s" 2005 release, "Halfway Home".

As a vocal workshop leader LaCroix has presented at Academy of Music and Dramatic Arts in Odense, Denmark, The Danish Musical Academy in Fredericia, Denmark, and The Psychotherapy Networker Symposium in Washington, DC. Today LaCroix performs and records with her band in Canada, the US and Denmark, released her sixth studio cd, The Great Divide, in November 2016, and has begun a duo project with Murali Coryell, son of jazz musician Larry Coryell.

She resides in Upstate New York with her husband and contributes to local events and projects there.

== Discography ==
- 2013 – "Moving On, Looking Back: - Artist: Dana LaCroix – Label: Independent
- 2011 – "Jump In: - Artist: Dana LaCroix - Label: Independent
- 2007 – "Faith In You" - Artist: Dana LaCroix - Label: Independent
- 2005 – "Halfway Home" – Artist: Hind – Label: BMG
- 2001 – "Down Home Blues" - Artist: Kenn Lending/Dana LaCroix - Label: Olufsen Records
- 1998 – "Pride" - Artist: Dana LaCroix - Label: Independent
- 1990 – "The Poppies" – Artist: The Poppies – Label: CBS Records

== Filmography ==
- 2003 – Fear X – (Contributing Songwriter) Director: Niels Winding Refn – Starring: John Turturro
