= The Road Is No Place for a Lady =

Studio album by Cass Elliot
- Released: October 1972
- Recorded: Summer 1972
- Studio: Trident Studios, London
- Genre: Pop rock
- Label: RCA Victor
- Producer: Lewis Merenstein

Cass Elliot chronology
Cass Elliot (1972)	The Road Is No Place for a Lady (1972)	Don't Call Me Mama Anymore (1973)

The Road Is No Place for a Lady is the fifth and final studio album released by Cass Elliot. It was the second album she recorded after signing with RCA Records. The album was recorded over a period of two months during the summer of 1972 at London's Trident Studios, produced by Lewis Merenstein and arranged and conducted by Larry Fallon and Del Newman.

The album was essentially pop music but with several different styles woven in. It contained touches of swing music and even gospel. Two singles were released; the first, "(If You're Gonna) Break Another Heart", was written by Albert Hammond and released in August 1972. The song had little impact on the charts along with the second single, "Does Anybody Love You", released in November.

== Conception ==
As with her previous album, Elliot was keen on exploring different musical avenues than what she had in the past. She chose Trident Studios along with British session musicians and studio engineers to help her achieve a "new" sound. As with her previous album, RCA granted her complete control over the material and allowed her to show her vision. The album was also credited to Cass Elliot and not "Mama Cass".

== Cover ==
The album cover was shot at Travel Town Museum in Griffith Park, Los Angeles by Ave Pildas and depicted Cass relaxing on a couch set on a railroad with a luxury train in the background.

== Reception ==
Professional ratings
Review scores
Source	Rating
Allmusic	link

The release of the album was originally slated for August 1972 but not released until October due to a fault in the mixing stage at Trident. As with Cass' previous self-titled album, released in February of that same year, the album was not a hit.

After its initial release, the album was unavailable for over 30 years. Due to the fault in the mixing stage the original tape masters would have to be completely re-mixed and remastered for a reissue to be possible. In 2005, the album's two singles were released on the CD Dream a Little Dream: The Music of 'Mama' Cass Elliot. The album was finally re-released in full in August 2009 in a Collector's Choice Music two on one CD with Cass Elliot.

In 2002, Rolling Stone magazine reviewed The Road Is No Place for a Lady.

== Track listing ==
1. "(If You're Gonna) Break Another Heart" (Albert Hammond, Michael Hazlewood)
2. "Saturday Suit" (Jimmy Webb)
3. "Does Anybody Love You" (Renée Armand, Kerry Chater)
4. "Walk Beside Me" (Mike Leslie, Billy Day)
5. "All My Life" (Diane Hildebrand, Leah Kunkel)
6. "Say Hello" (Paul Williams)
7. "Who in the World" (Chris Arnold, David Martin, Geoff Morrow)
8. "Love Was Not a Word" (Al Gorgoni, Trade Martin, Chip Taylor)
9. "Oh, Babe, What Would You Say?" (Eileen Sylvia Smith)
10. "The Road Is No Place for a Lady" (Kunkel)

== Personnel ==
- Cass Elliot – vocals
- Dave McRae – piano
- Don Randi – keyboards
- Chris Spedding – guitar
- Les Thacher – acoustic guitar
- Les Hurdle – bass
- Barry Morgan – drums
- Ray Cooper – percussion
- Kay Garner, Margo Quantrell, Vicki West – backing vocals
- Larry Fallon – arrangements, conductor
- Del Newman – arrangements, conductor

Technical

- David Hentschel – engineer
