= Dave Mason & Cass Elliot =

Studio album by Dave Mason and Cass Elliot
- Released: March 1971
- Recorded: 1970
- Studio: Record Plant, Los Angeles, California
- Genre: Pop-rock
- Length: 33:54
- Label: Blue Thumb
- Producer: Dave Mason, Cass Elliot

Cass Elliot chronology
Mama's Big Ones (1970)	Dave Mason & Cass Elliot (1971)	Cass Elliot (1972)

Dave Mason chronology
Alone Together (1970)	Dave Mason & Cass Elliot (1971)	Headkeeper (1972)

Dave Mason & Cass Elliot is a collaborative album between British musician Dave Mason and American singer Cass Elliot, formerly of Traffic and The Mamas & the Papas respectively. The album was produced by both Mason and Elliot and recorded in 1970. The album was released by Blue Thumb Records, which was Mason's label at the time.

== Conception ==
After being introduced by their mutual friend Gram Parsons, Mason and Elliot hit it off and decided to pursue singing together professionally. Elliot, having released two solo albums at that time, missed the collaborative effort of producing music and Mason, who had just arrived in the U.S. after splitting with Traffic, was interested in a fresh collaboration. Originally Elliot was intended to be co-producer with Mason on an intended solo album by the latter: after Elliot sang background for Mason on some sessions the idea of the album being a Mason/Elliot collaboration emerged.

== Album ==
Despite receiving co-billing with Mason, on several of the songs Elliot's contributions are limited to background vocals, which highlighted a raspy, more raw side of Elliot’s voice. When interviewed by Rolling Stone magazine Elliot stated, "I sing better with David because he's so good. You want to do better. I'm singing notes I never sang with The Mamas & the Papas".

The music falls into the country rock harmony sound of its time, but with a bluesier edge. Mason wrote five of the songs on the album, while Elliot co-wrote two: the single "Something to Make You Happy" and her only solo song on the album, "Here We Go Again". This was the first time that Elliot lent her hand in songwriting since her days with The Big 3 and The Mugwumps, and also the last.

Dave Mason & Cass Elliot was recorded at the Record Plant West in the autumn of 1970 for release by Blue Thumb Records, who had released Mason's debut album Alone Together: Dunhill Records, on whose roster Elliot was, held right of release to any singles from the album Dave Mason & Cass Elliot and also a second collaborative album from the two singers. Two singles were released from the album Dave Mason & Cass Elliot: "Something to Make You Happy" in January 1971, "Too Much Truth, Too Much Love" released the following month.

== Reception ==
Professional ratings
Review scores
Source	Rating
Allmusic	4/5 stars
Encyclopedia of Popular Music	2/5 stars

The album was released in March 1971 and was a moderate success, peaking at No. 49 on the Billboard Top LPs chart. To promote the album, Mason and Elliot both appeared and performed on The Tonight Show and The Andy Williams Show. They also performed two concerts with the first one at the Santa Monica Civic Auditorium and the second at New York’s Fillmore East. Although Mason and Elliot remained close friends and both discussed interest in recording together again, this would be their only collaboration.

It was reissued in 2008 by the British Rev-Ola Records. Cherry Red Records reissued the CD in 2019 as CDMRED737.

== Track listing ==
Side A
No.	Title	Writer(s)	Length
1.	"Walk to the Point"	Dave Mason	4:00
2.	"On and On"	Ned Doheny	3:35
3.	"To Be Free"	Dave Mason	3:34
4.	"Here We Go Again"	Cass Elliot, Bryan Garofalo	2:49
5.	"Pleasing You"	Dave Mason, M. Juster	3:02

Side B
No.	Title	Writer(s)	Length
6.	"Sit and Wonder"	Dave Mason	3:30
7.	"Something to Make You Happy"	Dave Mason, Cass Elliot	2:15
8.	"Too Much Truth, Too Much Love"	Dave Mason	3:49
9.	"Next to You"	Bryan Garofalo	2:31
10.	"Glittering Façade"	Dave Mason	4:45

== Personnel ==
- Dave Mason – guitar, vocals
- Cass Elliot – vocals
- Bryan Garofalo – bass
- Paul Harris – keyboards, strings
- Russ Kunkel – drums, percussion

Technical

- Dave Mason, Cass Elliot – producer
- Gary Kellgren – engineer
