= The Halifax Three =

Canadian folk music band (1963–1964)

- Genre: Folk music
- Years active: 1963–1964
- Label: Epic
- Past members: Pat LaCroix; Denny Doherty; Richard Byrne; Zal Yanovsky

The Halifax Three (or the Halifax III), originally the Colonials, was a folk music band in Canada in the 1960s. The band performed in Toronto and Montreal before becoming part of the New York folk scene and recording an album.

== History ==
Denny Doherty, Pat LaCroix, and Richard Byrne formed the Colonials in 1960 in Halifax, Nova Scotia, where they hosted a CBC TV programme. After performing in Toronto and Montreal, the band changed its name to The Halifax Three in 1963, and, with the addition of Toronto born Zal Yanovsky, toured with the Journeymen and played Carnegie Hall in New York City. The band signed with Epic Records and released two albums.

The band broke up in 1965. Doherty and Yanovsky formed the Mugwumps with Cass Elliot and Jim Hendricks. When that band ended, Yanovsky, with John Sebastian formed the Lovin' Spoonful while Doherty joined the Journeymen's John Phillips and his wife Michelle, to, later, along with Cass Elliot, form the Mamas & the Papas.

LaCroix became a Toronto photographer and jazz vocalist. Byrne returned to Halifax where he formed the short-lived New Halifax III with Scott McCulloch and Michael Stanbury from CBC Television's Singalong Jubilee.

In 2001, music from the Halifax Three was included in the retro compilation album The Magic Circle.

== Discography ==
=== Singles ===
- 1963: "Bull Train" / "Come On By" (Epic Records)
- 1963: "The Man Who Wouldn't Sing Along With Mitch" / "Come Down the Mountain Katie Daly" (Epic Records)
- 1963: "San Francisco Bay" / "All the Good Times" (Epic Records)

=== Albums ===
- 1963: The Halifax Three
- 1963: San Francisco Bay Blues
- 2002: Complete Halifax Three compilation of both albums and the single "All the Good Times"
