= The Coyote Sisters =

American pop-rock band

- Origin: Boston, Massachusetts, U.S.
- Genres: Pop rock; alternative rock; experimental rock; indie rock
- Years active: 1980–2001
- Labels: BBN Music; Geffen Records; Motown (via Morocco Records); Wannadate Records
- Past members: Leah Kunkel; Marty Gwinn Townsend; Renée Armand
- Website: www.coyotesisters.com

The Coyote Sisters were an American pop-rock female trio formed in 1980. Its members were Leah Kunkel, the younger sister of Cass Elliot; Marty Gwinn Townsend; and Renée Armand. Originally signed to Geffen Records until 1982, they were signed to Morocco Records, a subsidiary of Motown and released their self-titled debut LP in 1984. Lead single "Straight from the Heart (Into Your Life)" hit No. 66 on the US Billboard Hot 100 charts and was a bigger hit on the Adult Contemporary radio stations. Subsequent singles and the album were less successful.

The first self-titled album was produced, recorded and mixed at David J. Holman Studio in Laurel Canyon.

In 2001, the group made an unexpected return to the music industry, this time as a duo without Armand, and released the album Women and Other Visions on Wannadate Records. Although Armand was no longer part of the group, she co-wrote one song on the album.

In 2003, they signed a distribution deal with BBN Music in cooperation with Wannadate Records to rerelease all of their previous work on CD and online.

== Discography ==
=== Albums ===
- The Coyote Sisters (1984) #202 Billboard Bubbling Under The Top LPs
- Women and Other Visions (2001)

=== Singles ===
- "Straight from the Heart (Into Your Life)" — number 16, US Billboard Adult Contemporary; number 66, US Billboard Hot 100
- "I've Got a Radio" — number 39, US Billboard Adult Contemporary

== Production ==
- Produced by David J.Holman and co-produced by Roger Paglia
- Recorded and mixed by David J. Holman at his studio in Laurel Canyon
- Mastering: Bernie Grundman

=== Musicians ===
- Drums: Art Wood, Gary Ferguson, Mohamed Nircs
- Bass: Trey Thompson, Roger Paglia
- Guitar: Tony Berg
- Synthesizers: Michael Boddicker, David J. Holman, Tony Berg
- Horns: Jack Mack & The Heart Attack Horns
- Sax solo on "ANYBODY'S ANGEL": Phil Kenzie
