= Cass Elliot (album) =

Studio album by Cass Elliot
- Released: January 24, 1972
- Recorded: 1971
- Studios: RCA's Music Center of the World, Hollywood, California
- Genre: Pop rock
- Label: RCA Victor
- Producers: Lewis Merenstein, Benny Golson

Cass Elliot chronology
Dave Mason & Cass Elliot (1971)	Cass Elliot (1972)	The Road Is No Place for a Lady (1972)

Singles from Cass Elliot
- 1. "Baby I'm Yours" Released: February 1972; 2. "That Song" Released: April 1972

Cass Elliot is the fourth studio album released by Cass Elliot and the first album recorded for RCA Records, being released in January 1972.

Although signed to RCA in July 1970, Elliot did not begin recording her debut album for the label until late 1971, Elliot having in the interim recorded a collaborative album with Dave Mason for A&M's Blue Thumb label, and also reunited with the Mamas & the Papas for a final album release by the group on Dunhill. Recorded at RCA's Music Center of the World in Hollywood, the Cass Elliot album was produced by Lewis Merenstein with Benny Golson, the latter serving as conductor/ arranger.

With RCA granting her artistic freedom, Elliot pursued a more pared down, sophisticated sound for her first album with the label. Most of the songs were performed live in the studio. Elliot chose mostly standards. Elliot saw this album as her opportunity to finally distinguish herself as Cass Elliot and not "Mama Cass."

== Songs ==
"Baby, I’m Yours" was originally released by Barbara Lewis in 1965 and written by Van McCoy. This was the first single released from the album in February 1972 with "Cherries Jubilee" as the B-side.

"Jesus Was a Cross Maker" was originally written, performed and released by Judee Sill just four months prior to the release of this album.

"That Song" was the second single released in April 1972 with "When It Doesn’t Work Out" on the B-side. The song was a particular favorite of Cass’ who at the time who was going through a divorce from her second husband.

"When It Doesn’t Work Out" was written by Elliot's younger sister, Leah Kunkel, at that point married to drummer Russ Kunkel, with whom she raised Elliot's daughter Owen after Elliot's death in 1974.

"I'll Be There" was originally written and recorded by Bobby Darin in 1959.

"Disney Girls" was written by Beach Boy Bruce Johnston and recorded by The Beach Boys on their 1971 album Surf's Up. Johnston, who was a friend of Cass’, along with fellow Beach Boy Carl Wilson both played and sang backing vocals on it.

"I Think It's Going to Rain Today" was written by Randy Newman and released on his 1968 eponymous debut album and recorded by Dusty Springfield that same year. It had previously been covered by a number of artists, including Barbra Streisand, Judy Collins, Dusty Springfield, and Helen Reddy; it would later be covered by Bette Midler.

"All in the Game" was originally written in 1951 by Carl Sigman, based on a 1911 tune by Charles Dawes (US vice-president 1925–29) who had died earlier that year. The song became a hit for Tommy Edwards in 1958 and has since been performed by artists such as Barry Manilow, Van Morrison, Maureen McGovern, Andy Williams, Johnny Mathis, Art Garfunkel, Robert Goulet, Nat King Cole, and Phoebe Snow.

== Artwork ==
The album cover was shot by Hollywood photographer George Hurrell emulating the same style and glamour he used on movie stars such as Greta Garbo, Joan Crawford and Carole Lombard in the 1930s.

== Reception ==
Professional ratings
Review scores
Source	Rating
Allmusic	4/5 stars

Although praised by critics at the time, the album was not a hit. Although many artists would embrace and have success with standards such as Bette Midler, Liza Minnelli and Rod Stewart in years to come, the album was considered out of sync with the current musical trends.

== Reissue ==
The album was reissued by RCA on CD in 1988 and once again by RCA Japan in November 2000. Collector's Choice Music released the album, on August 25, 2009, on a CD featuring Elliot's follow-up album, The Road Is No Place for a Lady, with three bonus tracks. Sony Japan released the album on November 10, 2009, in a paper sleeve replica of the gatefold vinyl album with two bonus tracks. BGO remastered it on a 2-CD set in 2010. RCA released the remastered album to digital retailers in 2011 featuring three bonus tracks, with the album's last proper track retitled as "It's All in the Game." On May 24th, 2024, the album was reissued on silver vinyl, in a gatefold jacket.> This repress, individually numbered, was limited to 1000 copies.

== Track listing ==
Cass Elliot
No.	Title	Writer(s)	Length
1.	"I'll Be Home"	Randy Newman	3:37
2.	"Baby I'm Yours"	Van McCoy	2:32
3.	"Jesus Was a Cross Maker"	Judee Sill	3:04
4.	"That Song"	Bill Dean	2:12
5.	"When It Doesn't Work Out"	Leah Kunkel	4:25
6.	"I'll Be There"	Bobby Darin	2:24
7.	"Disney Girls"	Bruce Johnston	4:07
8.	"I Think It's Going to Rain Today"	Randy Newman	2:43
9.	"Cherries Jubilee"	Marilyn Messina	4:35
10.	"All in the Game"	Carl Sigman, Charles Dawes	3:12

Digital Bonus Tracks
No.	Title	Writer(s)	Length
11.	"East of the Sun (And West of the Moon)"	Brooks Bowman	2:33
12.	"We'll See"	John Sebastian	1:56
13.	"Try It, Baby"	Berry Gordy Jr.	3:24

== Personnel ==
- Cass Elliot – vocals
- William "Cat" Anderson, Gino Bozacco – trumpet
- Dennis Budimir, Larry Carlton, Ed Carter, Al Casey, Louis Shelton – guitar
- Gary Burden – art direction, design
- Clark Burroughs – vocals
- Benny Colson – vocals
- Reggie Colson – percussion
- Mickey Crofford – engineer
- Venetta Fields – vocals, backing vocals
- Carl Fortina – keyboards, musette
- Janice Gassman – vocals, backing vocals
- Benny Golson – arrangements, conductor, backing vocals, string section
- Jules "Stix" Greenberg – backing vocals
- Ed Greene, John Guerin – drums
- George Hurrell – photography
- Bruce Johnston – keyboards, vocals, backing vocals, Fender Rhodes
- Carol Kaye, Joe Osborn – bass guitar
- Clydie King – vocals, backing vocals
- Eddie Kusby, Grover Mitchell, Maurice Spears – trombone
- Mike Lang, Don Randi – piano
- Sherlie Matthews – vocals, backing vocals
- Marilyn Messina – vocals, backing vocals
- Jack Nimitz – baritone saxophone
- Jerome Richardson, Moacir Santos – tenor saxophone
- Maurice Spears – bass trombone
- Trent Strickland – mastering
- Carl Wilson – vocals
