= Don't Call Me Mama Anymore =

Live album by Cass Elliot
- Released: September 1973
- Recorded: July 20 and 22, 1973
- Venues: Mister Kelly's, Chicago
- Genres: Vocal; cabaret
- Label: RCA Victor

Cass Elliot chronology
The Road Is No Place for a Lady (1972)	Don't Call Me Mama Anymore (1973)

Don't Call Me Mama Anymore is a live album recorded by Cass Elliot. It was the third album she released by RCA Records and the last album released before her death.

== Conception ==
After the disappointment with her first two albums for RCA, Elliot felt that it was time for her to make some changes with her musical career. She hired Allan Carr as her manager who at the time managed the careers of Tony Curtis, Ann-Margret and Peter Sellers. Carr felt that Elliot needed to leave pop and rock music altogether and head into the cabaret circuit. So a show was put together that consisted of old standards along with a few new songs written for her by friends. The act included Elliot along with two male singers who served as backing singers and sidekicks during the musical numbers.

The title of the show, Don't Call Me Mama Anymore, was named after one of the songs written by Elliot's friend, Walter Earl Brown. The song was born out of Elliot's frustration with being identified as "Mama Cass".

After the show debuted on February 9, 1973, in Pittsburgh, Elliot felt she was ready to take the show to Las Vegas and premiered at The Flamingo. Elliot received rave reviews and took the place by storm. The Las Vegas Sun wrote, "Cass Elliot, making a strong point that she is no longer Mama Cass, has a good act serving notice that she is here to stay. The audience was with her all the way... no empty seats anywhere." She then followed up her act in casinos and tony nightclubs in cities throughout the country.

With the success of the show, Carr suggested that Elliot record a live album of the show. The idea of recording a live album was not something she was particularly keen on doing having told Chet Dowling, the show's scriptwriter, "I think there's nothing more boring than a live album."

The idea was also hatched to release the album simultaneously with her television special that September.

== Album ==
The album was recorded live over a series of nights at the famed Mister Kelly's in Chicago. The album included "Extraordinary" from the Broadway play Pippin, "My Love" written by Paul McCartney and Elliot's rendition of the classic "I'll Be Seeing You".

Among the other songs introduced by the album was the title song written by her friend Walter Earl Brown along with "I'm Coming to the Best Part of My Life" written by friends Roger Nichols and John Bettis. The song captured Elliot's newfound confidence and was performed for Johnny Carson when she sang it on The Tonight Show on September 27, 1973. Another popular number at the shows was "The Night Before" which for composer Al Kasha was the reason he wrote "The Morning After", his Academy Award winning theme for The Poseidon Adventure.

== Reception ==
Professional ratings
Review scores
Source	Rating
Allmusic	3/5 stars
Creem	D

It turned out to be the last new album Elliot released during her lifetime. Despite the success of the shows, the album, as with Elliot's two previous albums, was not a hit. No singles were released, although a studio version of "I Think A Lot About You" had been released as a single earlier in the year, backed with "Listen To the World".

The album was re-released by BMG in November 2000 with three bonus tracks: "Theme From L'Amour", "I Think A Lot About You (Studio Version)" and "Listen To The World".

Several songs from the album appeared on the 1997 compilation CD Dream a Little Dream: The Cass Elliot Collection and "I'm Coming to the Best Part of My Life" was included on the 2005 compilation CD Dream a Little Dream of Me: The Music of 'Mama' Cass Elliot.

In a review for Creem, Robert Christgau rated the album a D and commented "How about 'Fatso'?"

== Track listing ==
1. "Introduction: Dream a Little Dream of Me/Extraordinary" (Fabian Andre, Gus Kahn, Wilbur Schwandt / Stephen Schwartz) – 2:38
2. "I Think a Lot About You" (Margo Guryan) – 2:12
3. "Audience Rap" (Cass Elliot) – 2:07
4. "Don't Call Me Mama Anymore" (Walter Earl Brown) – 3:10
5. "My Love" (Linda McCartney, Paul McCartney) – 3:24
6. "I'm Coming to the Best Part of My Life" (John Bettis, Roger Nichols) – 3:53
7. "The Torch Song Medley:" (Ahlert, Arlen, Brown, Cromwell, Ellington, Oscar Hammerstein II, Jerome Kern, Ted Koehler, Turk, Warner, Webster-Robbins) – 6:05
  1. "I Came Here to Sing a Torch Song"
  2. "I Gotta Right to Sing the Blues"
  3. "I Got It Bad (and That Ain't Good)"
  4. "Mean to Me"
  5. "Why Was I Born?"
  6. "I Came Here to Sing a Torch Song" (Reprise)
8. "Audience Rap" (Cass Elliot) – 1:29
9. "The Night Before" (Joel Hirschhorn, Al Kasha) – 3:14
10. "I Like What I Like" (Bruce Wheaton) – 4:02
11. "I'll Be Seeing You/Don't Call Me Mama Anymore" (Reprise) (Michael Sklar, Ben Weisman) – 3:08

== Personnel ==
- Cass Elliot – Vocals
- Michael Kraft – Reissue producer
