= Lisa LaCroix =

Canadian actress and fashion model

Lisa LaCroix is a Canadian actress and fashion model who began her career in Toronto, Ontario, Canada. After training as an actor in New York City's Circle in the Square Theatre School, she returned to Toronto, and starred in numerous Canadian and American television shows and movies. In 1996, she moved to Los Angeles to focus on American television acting.

In 2000, LaCroix became interested in the Human Potential Movement, studied to be a business coach, moved to the San Francisco Bay Area and began a private practice training and coaching business people in 2001. She cofounded Paragon Strategies in 2004 with two other trainers from San Francisco, which presently serves various businesses worldwide in optimizing their employee satisfaction and productivity.

Her father is the photographer and jazz musician Pat LaCroix. Her sister is singer/songwriter, Dana LaCroix.

== Filmography ==
- Divided Loyalties (1989)
- E.N.G.
  - The Dancer and the Dance (1990) TV Episode .... Nancy Chou
  - Another Pretty Face (1992) TV Episode .... Kelly Longstreet
- Psychic (1992) .... Susi
- Family Passions (1993) TV Series .... Anita
- Kung Fu: The Legend Continues - Shaman (1993) TV Episode .... Dancing Moon
- Dance Me Outside (1995) .... Illianna
- Rent-a-Kid (1995) (TV) .... Teresa Woolcot
- "The Rez"
  - Episode #1.1 (1996) TV Episode .... Illianna
  - Episode #1.6 (1996) TV Episode .... Illianna
- Ed McBain's 87th Precinct: Ice (1996) (TV) .... Judite
- PSI Factor: Chronicles of the Paranormal (1996) TV Series .... Dr. Natasha Constantine (1996–1999)
- Chicago Hope - Leggo My Ego (1997) TV Episode .... Lily Burroughs
- "Murder, She Wrote: South by Southwest" (1997) (TV) .... Pearl Sunrise
- Fargo (2003) (TV)
