= Alone Together (Dave Mason album) =

Studio album by Dave Mason
- Released: July 1970
- Recorded: 1970
- Studio: Sunset Sound, Hollywood; Elektra Sound, Los Angeles
- Genre: Folk rock; blues rock
- Length: 34:38
- Label: Blue Thumb
- Producer: Dave Mason, Tommy LiPuma

Dave Mason chronology
Alone Together (1970)	Dave Mason & Cass Elliot (1971)

Singles from Alone Together
- 1. "Only You Know and I Know" Released: July 1970

Alone Together is the debut solo album by former Traffic member Dave Mason, released in 1970. Mason was joined on the album by a roster of guest musicians, including Bonnie Bramlett, Leon Russell, Jim Capaldi, Rita Coolidge, Carl Radle and Jim Gordon. The song "Only You Know and I Know" reached number No. 42 on the Billboard charts in the US and was the record's major commercial success.

== Packaging ==
About 30% of the records were produced in so-called marble vinyl, a swirled mix of pink, brown and beige, rather than the usual black vinyl. The original record jacket is a tri-fold with a half-pocket on the inside to hold the record (originally issued without a paper inner sleeve). The top of the tri-fold has a die-cut image of Mason in a top hat and morning dress, collaged behind a rocky outcrop, and there is a small die-cut hole at the top to permit the jacket to be hung on the wall as a poster.

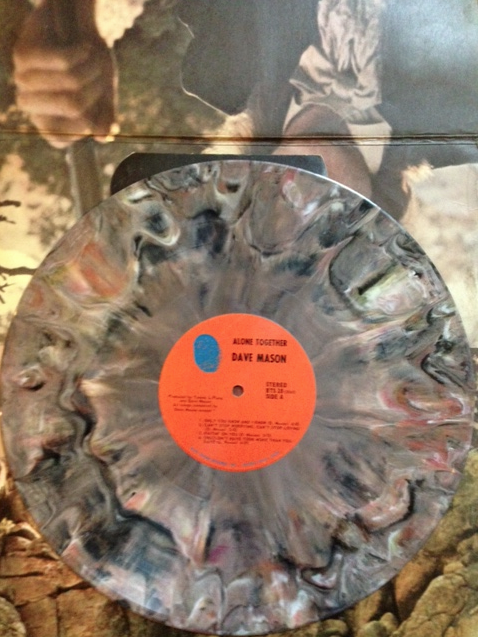
Alone Together album and jacket, featuring "marble vinyl" disc.

== Critical reception ==
Billboard magazine reviewed the album favourably in 1970: "Mason with help from friends Jim Capaldi and Leon Russell proves his mastery of the rock idiom once and for all. The lyric content and music content of every song catches the senses of the listener and creates excitement. There is no doubt about the power of this album, and it should prove a top chart item." Jon Carroll was less enthusiastic in Rolling Stone, finding it technically accomplished but "more potential than realization", featuring often trivial lyrics and never soaring from its "vinyl bonds".

In Christgau's Record Guide: Rock Albums of the Seventies (1981), Robert Christgau found the music "both complex and likable-to-catchy, with a unique light feel that begins with the way Mason doubles on acoustic and electric", but believed Mason lacked the "poetic gift" to put across his evasive lyrics. He gave the album a "B" grade. Jim Newsom from AllMusic was more impressed in a retrospective review, regarding the album as Mason's best work, featuring "an excellent batch of melodically pleasing songs, built on a fat bed of strumming acoustic guitars with tasteful electric guitar accents and leads." He gave it four-and-a-half out of five stars.

== Track listing ==
All tracks are written by Dave Mason, except where indicated

No.	Title	Writer(s)	Length
1.	"Only You Know and I Know"		4:05
2.	"Can't Stop Worrying, Can't Stop Loving"		3:02
3.	"Waitin' on You"		3:05
4.	"Shouldn't Have Took More Than You Gave"		6:00
5.	"World in Changes"		4:30
6.	"Sad and Deep as You"		3:35
7.	"Just a Song"		2:59
8.	"Look at You Look at Me"	Dave Mason, Jim Capaldi	7:22

== Personnel ==
- Dave Mason – guitars, vocals
- Leon Russell — piano
- Larry Knechtel, John Simon — keyboards
- Michael DeTemple, Don Preston — guitars
- Chris Ethridge, Larry Knechtel, Carl Radle — bass
- John Barbata, Jim Capaldi, Jim Gordon, Jim Keltner — drums
- Bonnie Bramlett, Rita Coolidge, Mike Coolidge, Lou Cooper, Claudia Lennear, Bob Norwood, Jack Storti – backing vocals

Production

- Dave Mason, Tommy LiPuma – production
- Bruce Botnick, Douglas Botnick — engineering
- Al Schmitt — mixing
- Barry Feinstein, Tom Wilkes – photography, design
