= Pat LaCroix =

Canadian musician and photographer (born 1938)

- Born: Patrick LaCroix; 1938 (age 87–88)
- Origin: Canada
- Occupations: Musician, photographer
- Website: www.patlacroix.com

Patrick "Pat" LaCroix (born 1938) is a Canadian musician and photographer.

== Early life and education ==
LaCroix attended the Westlake College of Music in Los Angeles.

== Career ==
While at college La Croix was part of The Four Winds vocal quartet with fellow student Gordon Lightfoot. He was a founding member of the folk band The Colonials, with Denny Doherty and Richard Byrne. Guitarist Zal Yanovsky was hired to accompany the group for the "Hootenanny USA" tour in late 1963, which included a performance at Carnegie Hall. Earlier that year the band had been renamed The Halifax III. This group recorded two LP albums for Epic records in New York and performed on several national television show in Canada and the US, including Sing Along With Mitch and The Merv Griffin Show.

In 1965, LaCroix began his commercial photographic career, and musically returned to his first love, singing Jazz.

LaCroix has received more the 60 awards for his photography and in 2008 was awarded The Lifetime Achievement award by the Canadian Association of Photographers and Illustrators in Communication. In 2017, LaCroix and Ted O'Reilly published Toronto Jazz Treasures, a coffee table book of photographic portraits of 100 of Toronto's best-known jazz musicians.

== Personal life ==
He currently lives with his wife Naomi. He is the father of actress Lisa LaCroix and singer/songwriter, Dana LaCroix.

== Discography ==
=== Folk period ===
- Magic Circle
- Halifax III (Album) San Francisco Bay Blues
- The Halifax III (album)
- "The Man Who Wouldn't Sing Along With Mitch" (single)

=== Jazz period ===
- 2002 - This is All I Ask
- 2005 - The Ballad Artistry of Pat LaCroix
