= Fantasy Fair and Magic Mountain Music Festival =

Event held in California

Coordinates: 37.91258°N 122.60844°W

- Festival ad with scheduled performers
- Genre: Pop rock, Psychedelic rock, Soul music, Contemporary folk music
- Dates: June 10–11, 1967
- Locations: Cushing Memorial Amphitheatre in Marin County, California
- Years active: 1967
- Founders: KFRC 610 / Tom Rounds

The KFRC Fantasy Fair and Magic Mountain Music Festival was an event held June 10 and 11, 1967, at the 4,000-seat Sidney B. Cushing Memorial Amphitheatre high on the south face of Mount Tamalpais in Marin County, California. Although 20,000 tickets were reported to have been sold for the event, as many as 40,000 people may have actually attended the two-day concert, which was the first of a series of San Francisco–area cultural events known as the Summer of Love. The Fantasy Fair was influenced by the popular Renaissance Pleasure Faire and became a prototype for large scale multi-act outdoor rock music events now known as rock festivals.

== Description ==
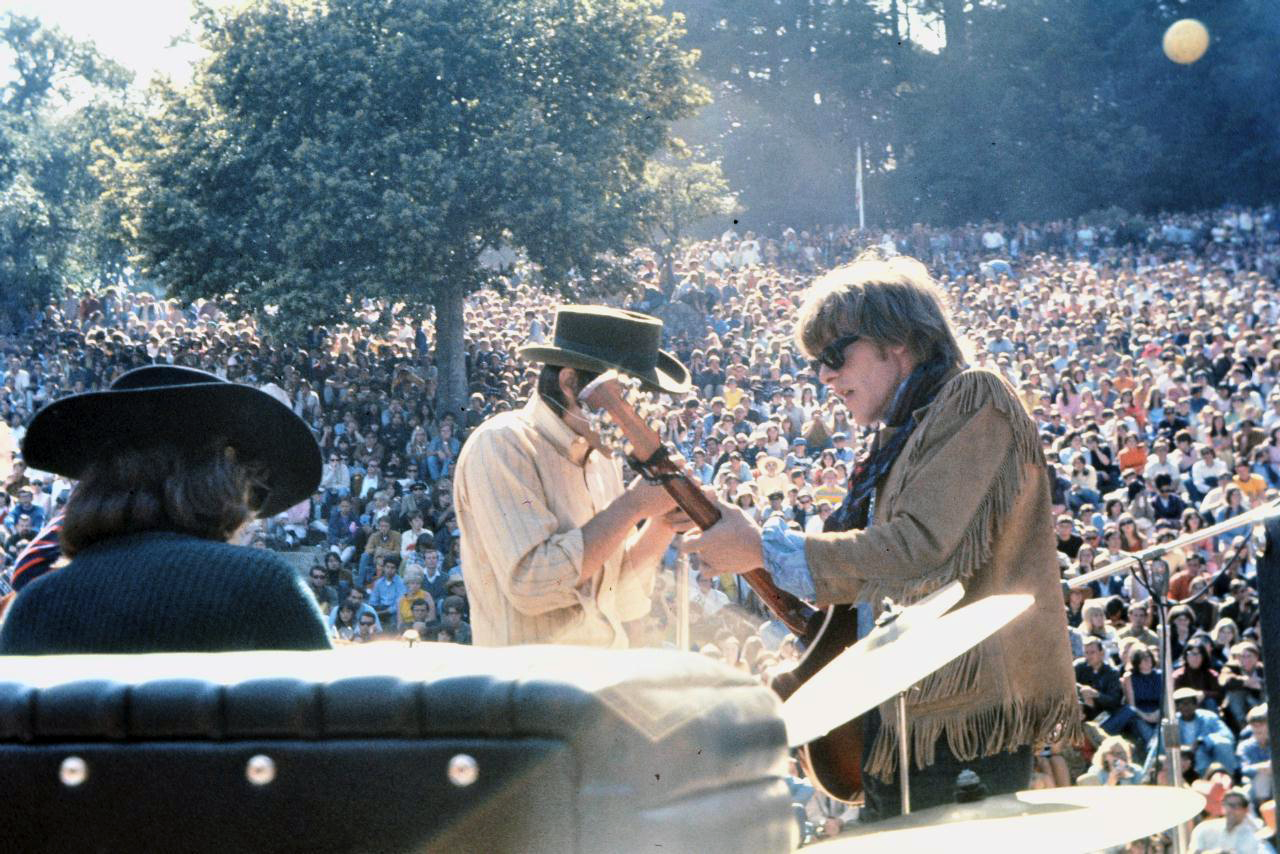
Spencer Dryden, Marty Balin and Paul Kantner of Jefferson Airplane performing at the Fantasy Fair

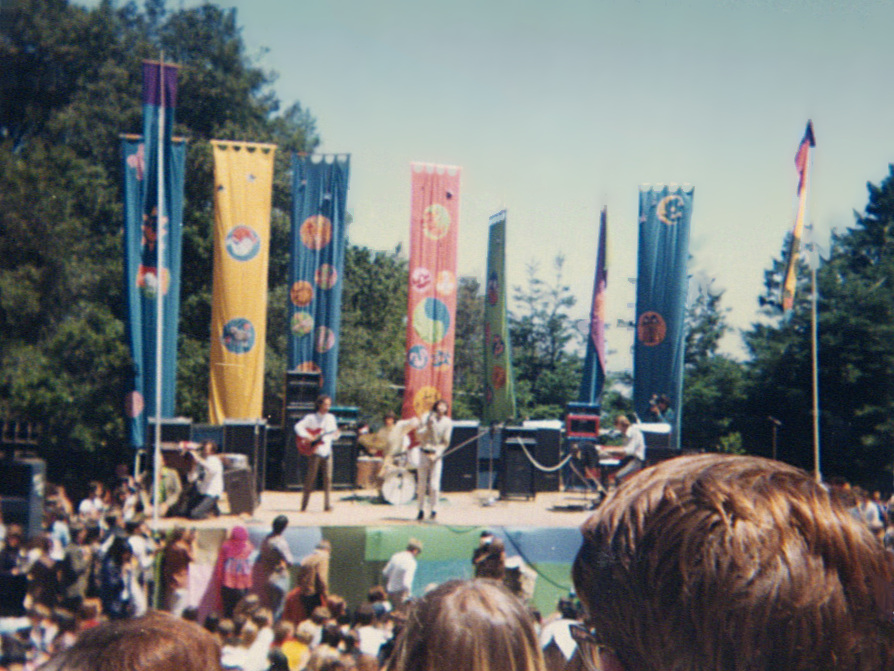
The Doors on the main stage

The organizers chartered school buses to shuttle attendees and musicians up the mountain from Mill Valley, as Panoramic Highway had been closed to traffic. Those who missed the bus could catch a ride on the back of one of the Hells Angels’ Harleys. Admission to the festival was $2.00 and all proceeds were donated to the nearby Hunters Point Child Care Center in San Francisco. The Fantasy Fair was originally scheduled for June 3 and 4 as a benefit for the center, but was delayed one week by inclement weather. Several acts booked for the original dates were unable to perform.

KFRC 610, the RKO Bill Drake "Boss Radio" Top 40 AM station in San Francisco, had significant influence in the music industry among both counterculture and commercial acts. This enabled festival organizer Tom Rounds, KFRC's program director, to present a colorful and eclectic line-up of popular musicians from both in and outside the region. Canned Heat, Dionne Warwick, Every Mother's Son, The Merry-Go-Round, The Mojo Men, P. F. Sloan, The Seeds, Country Joe and the Fish, Captain Beefheart, The Byrds with Hugh Masekela on trumpet, Tim Buckley, The Sparrows, The Grass Roots, The Loading Zone, The 5th Dimension and Jefferson Airplane were among the performers who appeared. The Fantasy Fair was also The Doors' first large show and happened during the rise of the group's first major hit, "Light My Fire", to the top of the charts.

Among posters created for the event was one designed by artist Stanley Mouse, then gaining acclaim for poster-art created for Bill Graham, the Fillmore Auditorium and Grateful Dead.

"we did this bus thing where we parked everybody down in Marin County in various parking lots and bussed them up the mountain."
- Mel Lawrence (Fantasy Fair co-producer, later, Woodstock's operations manager)

"There were school buses going up and down the mountainside. There's nothing like driving down the center line on a motorcycle with a bus going one way and a bus going the other way and a foot of clearance on either side."
- Barry "The Fish" Melton (Country Joe and the Fish)

"I had my guitar in my hand and there was no way to drive up to the stage. So I'm walking and walking and going, "If I planned on going on a hike, I probably would've worn different shoes." I walked all the way up."
- Jorma Kaukonen (Jefferson Airplane)

After waiting hours for a ride up the mountain from embarkation points at the Marin County Civic Center, Mill Valley and other locations, attendees were greeted by a giant Buddha balloon when they arrived at the amphitheater. Transportation was provided by the tongue-in-cheek-named "Trans-Love Bus Lines", a variation of the line "Fly Trans Love Airways, get you there on time" from the lyrics to Donovan's song "Fat Angel". Performances were on a main stage and a smaller second stage. Various art-fair type vendors sold posters, crafts and refreshments from booths scattered in the woods around the amphitheater. The festival included a large geodesic dome of pipes and fittings covered with black plastic that contained a light and sound show.

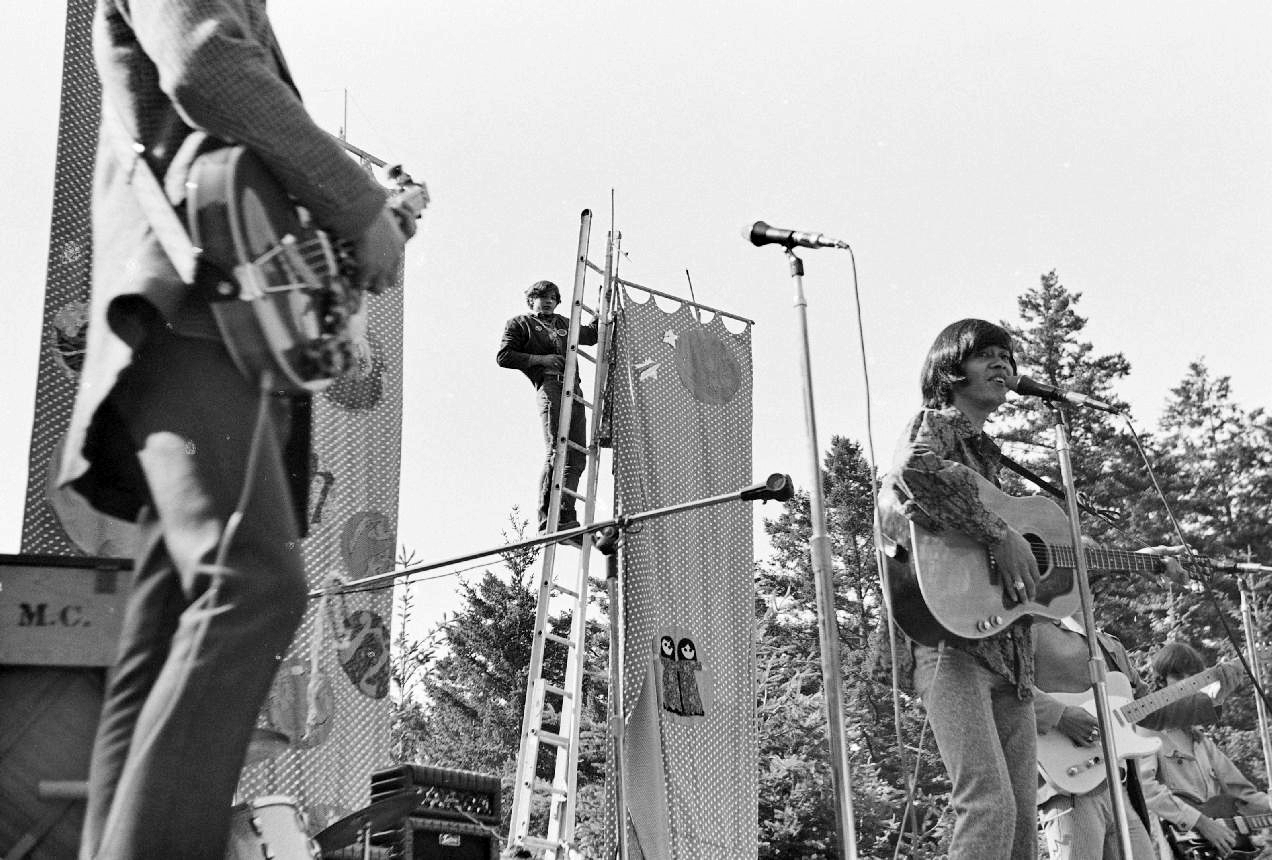
The Lamp of Childhood plays while a stagehand attends to a backdrop banner

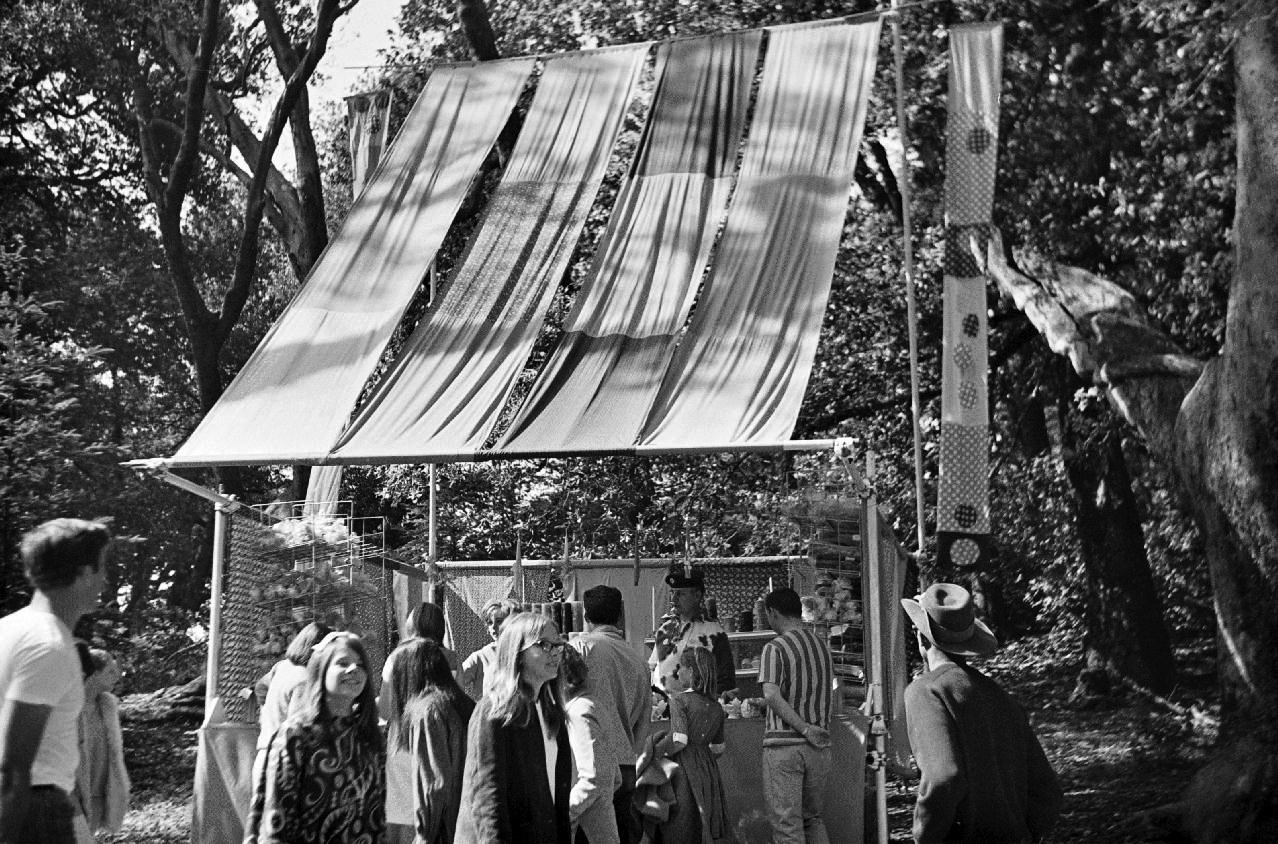
One of the craft booths at the fair

The Magic Mountain Music Festival was favorably reviewed for safety in contemporary press accounts. Fights or disturbances were not an issue, and at the end of the day, trash was placed in or next to the garbage cans provided, and the crowd left Mount Tamalpais as they had found it.

Reminiscent of their role at the Human Be-In the previous January in Golden Gate Park, members of the Hells Angels motorcycle club pitched in peacefully to help find lost children and to ferry musicians and others up and down the mountain's winding road. While they were not officially hired by organizers, the group also acted as de facto security for the event.

== Significance ==
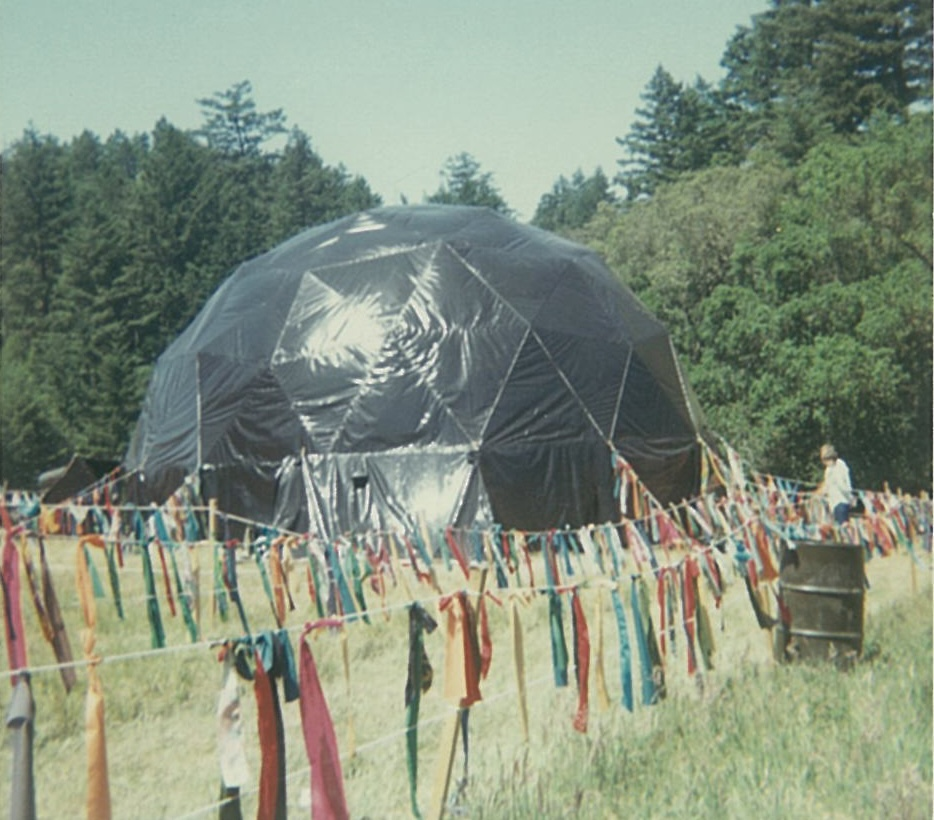
Geodesic dome at the Fantasy Fair

While the highly documented Monterey International Pop Festival continues to be remembered as the seminal event of the 1967 Summer of Love, the KFRC Festival took place one week before Monterey and is considered to have been America's - if not the world's - first rock festival.

To some commentators, the festival represented a sea change in musical preferences among young Bay Area radio listeners as the hippie culture fully arose in mid-1967. Alec Palao and Jud Cost chronicled the San Francisco mid-sixties era music scene in 1991 in their magazine Cream Puff War #1. Writing about the weeks surrounding the Fantasy Fair, Cost noted that "the dichotomy in Bay Area music was never so evident, as the self-proclaimed "adult" scene separated itself from the "teen/pop" scenes." Scram Magazine juxtaposed that view with pioneer rock magazine editor Greg Shaw's recollection that the rift between the tastes of teens and adults didn't form until later, after the freeform radio style then being established by Tom Donahue fully emerged in the fall of 1967. A review of the bands that played indicates that most were groups that played the Fillmore and Avalon ballrooms and were part of the psychedelic rock scene at the time.

== Performances ==
=== Saturday, June 10 ===
- The Charlatans
- Mount Rushmore
- Rodger Collins
- Dionne Warwick
- The Doors
- The Lamp of Childhood
- Canned Heat
- Jim Kweskin Jug Band
- Spanky and Our Gang
- Blackburn & Snow
- The Sparrows
- Every Mother's Son
- Kaleidoscope
- The Chocolate Watchband
- The Mojo Men
- The Merry-Go-Round

=== Sunday, June 11 ===
- Jefferson Airplane
- The Byrds w/ Hugh Masekela
- P. F. Sloan
- Captain Beefheart & the Magic Band
- The Seeds
- The Grass Roots
- The Loading Zone
- Tim Buckley
- Every Mother's Son
- Steve Miller Blues Band
- Country Joe and the Fish
- Sons of Champlin
- The 5th Dimension
- The Lamp of Childhood
- The Mystery Trend
- Penny Nichols
- The Merry-Go-Round
- New Salvation Army Band

== See also ==
- List of historic rock festivals
