= The Mugwumps (band) =

American folk rock band (1964)

- 1967 album cover From left to right: Zal Yanovsky, Jim Hendricks, Cass Elliot and Denny Doherty

Background information
- Origin: New York City, U.S.
- Genres: Rock
- Years active: 1964
- Label: Warner Bros.
- Spinoffs: The Lovin' Spoonful; The Mamas & the Papas
- Spinoff of: The Big Three; The Halifax Three
- Past members: Denny Doherty; Cass Elliot; Jim Hendricks; John Sebastian; Art Stokes; Zal Yanovsky

The Mugwumps was an American rock band formed in New York City in 1964. Signed to Warner Bros., the group released one single before disbanding in late 1964. An album by the band went unreleased until 1967, when some of its former members had become famous in the Mamas and the Papas (Cass Elliot and Denny Doherty) and the Lovin' Spoonful (Zal Yanovsky and John Sebastian).

== History ==
Jim Hendricks and Cass Elliot, alongside Tim Rose, were members of a folk group called the Big 3, which saw some success in New York and landed several television appearances. Denny Doherty and Zal Yanovsky were members of the Halifax Three, and became acquainted with Elliot while on tour. John Sebastian was a session musician who performed in the short-lived Even Dozen Jug Band. By 1964, all three bands had dissolved. Hendricks, Elliot, Doherty, Yanovsky, and Sebastian came together to form the Mugwumps.

The origin of the band's name is unclear. One source says that it was taken from the William S. Burroughs novel The Naked Lunch. The liner notes for the 2007 re-release of The Mugwumps reports Hendricks's claim that the name came from music producer Erik Jacobsen. Denny Doherty claimed that the name came from his Newfoundland grandmother. Historically, "Mugwumps" were dissident American Republicans of 1884, from Algonquian mugquomp, "important person".

The Mugwumps largely played remakes of other artists' material such as “Searchin'”, with some of their own original songs. They recorded one album, which was released after the band had split up.

Arthur Mogull, the head of Warner Bros. Records' Eastern operations, signed the Mugwumps to the label in August 1964. That same month, the group recorded an album-worth of material over two days of sessions. Warner Bros. released only one single from the sessions, "I'll Remember Tonight", which failed to chart. Sebastian joined the group too late to have contributed to the group's recordings. Warner Bros. released the rest of the band's recorded material in 1967, after its former members had become famous.

Cass Elliot and Denny Doherty went on to form the Mamas & the Papas with Michelle and John Phillips (who told the story of the Mugwumps in their song "Creeque Alley"). John Sebastian and Zal Yanovsky, meanwhile, formed the Lovin' Spoonful, who released a number of hit albums and singles, including the chart-topping "Summer in the City". Hendricks later formed the band The Lamp of Childhood, and eventually found more success as a songwriter, writing the Johnny Rivers hit "Summer Rain" and the theme song for the television series Then Came Bronson.

== Discography ==
=== Albums ===
List of studio albums
| Year | Album details |
|---|---|
| 1967 | The Mugwumps: Released: July 1967; Recorded: August 1964; Label: Warner Bros. (W 1697/WS 1697) |

=== Singles ===
List of singles
| Year | Single details |
|---|---|
| 1964 | "I Don't Wanna Know" (Note: Richie Unterberger and Jay Warner each indicate that "I'll Remember Tonight" was the single's A-side, but a contemporary newspaper article writes it was "I Don't Wanna Know".) b/w "I'll Remember Tonight": Released: September 1964; Recorded: August 1964; Label: Warner Bros. (5471) |
| 1967 | "Searchin'" b/w "Here It Is Another Day": Released: 1967; Recorded: August 1964; Label: Warner Bros. (7018) |
