= Leah Kunkel =

American singer (1948–2024)

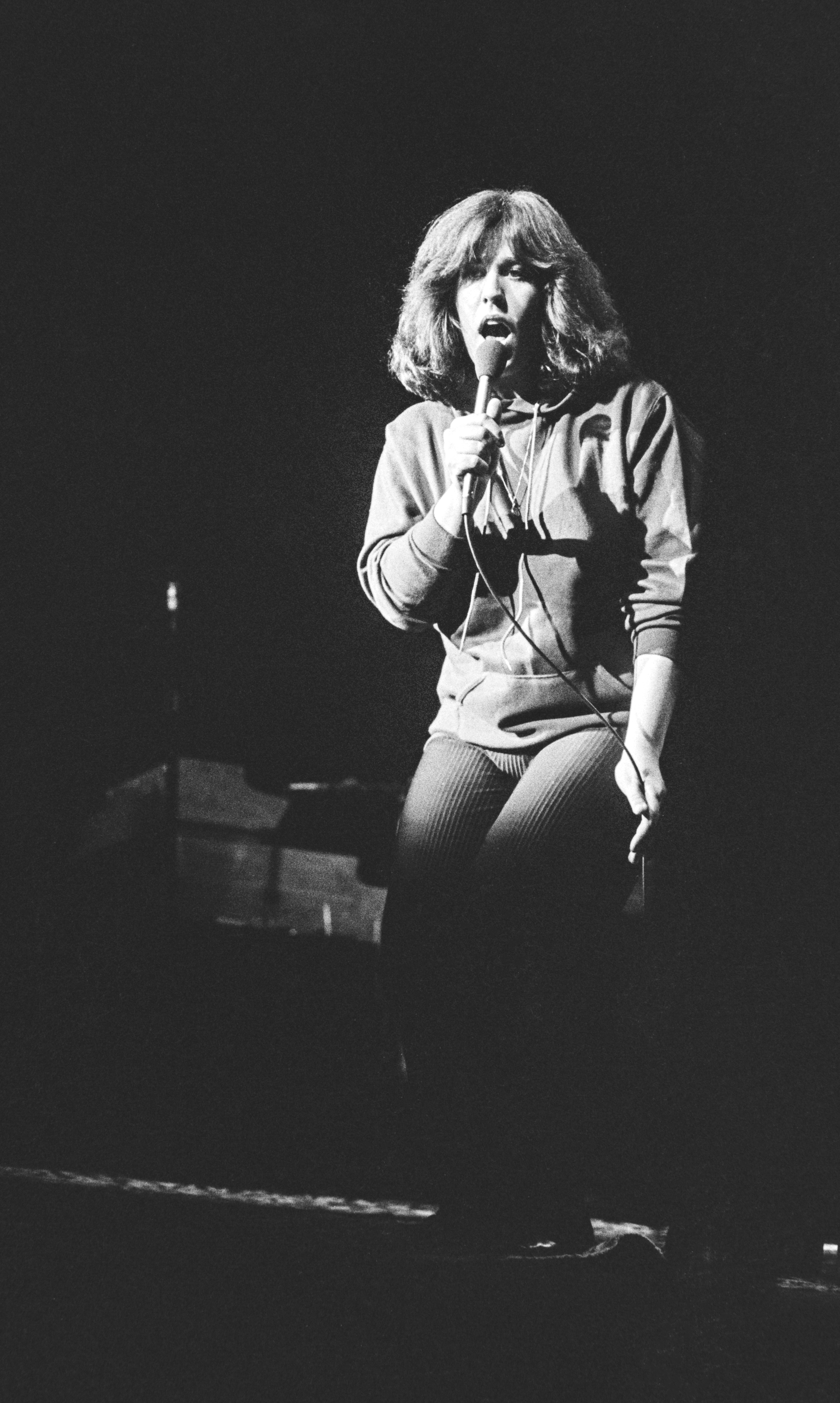
- Kunkel performing in 1980

Background information
- Born: Leah R. Cohen; June 15, 1948; Washington D.C, U.S.
- Died: November 26, 2024 (aged 76) Amherst, Massachusetts, U.S.
- Genres: Popular; folk
- Occupations: Singer; songwriter
- Years active: 1968–2024
- Formerly of: Coyote Sisters
- Website: coyotesisters.com

Leah Kunkel (née Cohen; June 15, 1948 – November 26, 2024) was an American singer and attorney.

She was the younger sister of acclaimed singer Cass Elliot of The Mamas & The Papas.

== Music career ==
Leah Cohen was born on June 15, 1948. She was the younger sister of Cass Elliot, best known as a member of the folk-rock vocal group the Mamas & the Papas.

After being signed to Dunhill Records, Kunkel recorded her first record, Billy, under the name Cotton Candy. She performed with a few bands and continued growing as a singer and songwriter. In 1972, she sang the counter-melody for "From Silver Lake" on Jackson Browne's eponymous debut album. Following additional session work with Stephen Bishop, Carly Simon, and Arlo Guthrie in the early 1970s, Kunkel appeared on James Taylor's 1977 album JT. That same year, she appeared on Art Garfunkel's album Watermark. Garfunkel relied on her vocal harmonies for his subsequent albums Fate for Breakfast (1979), Scissors Cut (1981), and Lefty (1988), and he became something of a mentor to her, helping to get her a recording contract with Columbia Records in 1979.

In 1979, Kunkel released her first album for Columbia Records, which featured several of her own compositions. The self-titled album produced one single, "Step Right Up". The following year, she released her second solo album for Columbia, I Run With Trouble.

In 1980, Kunkel teamed up with Marty Gwinn and Renée Armand to form the Coyote Sisters. In 1984, they released their first album, The Coyote Sisters, on Lorimar Records. A follow-up album (with minimal contributions from Armand), Women and Other Visions, was released in 2001. The Coyote Sisters continued to perform with Kunkel, who also continued to appear as a solo performer.

== Legal career ==
Kunkel attended Smith College, graduating in 1988, and Western New England School of Law. She was in private practice for over 25 years. Licensed in Massachusetts, she concentrated her practice in entertainment law but worked in adolescent law, and served as an adjunct professor at Western New England School of Law. She also worked with the ACLU.

== Personal life and death ==
In 1968, she married American drummer and music producer Russ Kunkel. Following her sister Cass's death in 1974, Kunkel was given custody of Cass's daughter, Owen. She and Russ Kunkel also raised their son Nathaniel, who later became an Emmy Award-winning sound engineer. Leah and Russ Kunkel divorced in the 1980s.

Kunkel died of cancer on November 26, 2024, at the age of 76.

== Discography ==
=== Solo albums ===
- Leah Kunkel (1979) Columbia Records
- I Run With Trouble (1980) Columbia Records

=== With the Coyote Sisters ===
- The Coyote Sisters by the Coyote Sisters (1984)
- Women And Other Visions by the Coyote Sisters (2001)

=== Vocal appearances ===
Kunkel appeared as a guest vocalist on the following albums:

- Dave Mason & Cass Elliot by Dave Mason and Cass Elliot (1971)
- Jackson Browne by Jackson Browne (1972) on "From Silver Lake"
- Another Passenger by Carly Simon (1976) on "In Times When My Head"
- Amigo by Arlo Guthrie (1976)
- JT by James Taylor (1977) on "Handy Man"
- Watermark by Art Garfunkel (1977)
- Craig Fuller & Eric Kaz by Craig Fuller and Eric Kaz (1978)
- Fate for Breakfast by Art Garfunkel (1979)
- An American Dream by The Dirt Band (1979) on "Dance the Night Away" and one other song
- Scissors Cut by Art Garfunkel (1981)
- Angel Heart by Jimmy Webb (1982)
- Lefty by Art Garfunkel (1988)
- Life Is Good by Livingston Taylor (1988)
- Earth by Matthew Sweet {1989)
- Suspending Disbelief by Jimmy Webb (1993)
