= Jim Hendricks (musician) =

American guitarist and folk musician (born 1940)

- Born: James Richard Hendricks; February 10, 1940 (age 86); Atkinson, Nebraska, US
- Occupation: Guitarist
- Years active: 1960s–present
- Known for: Former member of The Mugwumps
- Spouse: Cass Elliot (m. 1963; ann. 1968)

James Richard Hendricks (born February 10, 1940) is an American guitarist and folk musician.

== Biography ==
Born in Atkinson, Nebraska, Hendricks began playing the guitar and lap steel guitar in his youth, and began performing publicly while working as a teacher in Omaha, Nebraska, in the early 1960s. One of his shows was attended by Cass Elliot, who invited Hendricks to join her and Tim Rose in the New York folk group the Big 3. The group was successful playing The Bitter End, touring with comedian Bill Cosby and appearing on The Tonight Show.

Hendricks was married to Elliot in 1963, but the marriage was annulled in 1968. In 1964, Elliot and Hendricks started the folk group the Mugwumps, which included Denny Doherty, and Zal Yanovsky. The group lasted for eight months before Yanovsky formed the Lovin' Spoonful and Doherty and Elliot would become one-half of the Mamas & the Papas. Hendricks moved to Los Angeles and formed the Lamp of Childhood, which released three singles on Dunhill Records in 1966–67 without success. He improved his songwriting while with the band, and after leaving it wrote "Summer Rain", a hit for Johnny Rivers, and "Long Lonesome Highway", theme song of the television series Then Came Bronson.

In the 1970s, Hendricks moved to Nashville, Tennessee, and began touring with family and writing contemporary Christian music. Hendricks plays guitar, mandolin, dobro, and autoharp, and has recorded more than 50 albums spanning a variety of styles, mainly Americana, country and contemporary Christian, including several instrumental albums for Benson Records and later Maple Street Music, a label he co-founded in 1996.
