= Regent Theatre (Picton, Ontario) =

Coordinates: 44.00748°N 77.14052°W

- Interactive map of Regent Theatre (Picton, Ontario)
- Address: Picton, Ontario; Canada
- Owner: Regent Theatre Foundation
- Type: Edwardian opera house,
- Current use: Professional and amateur theatre

Construction
- Opened: 1918
- Years active: 1918-present
- Architect: Warrington and Page

Website
- http://www.theregenttheatre.org/index.html The Regent Theatre

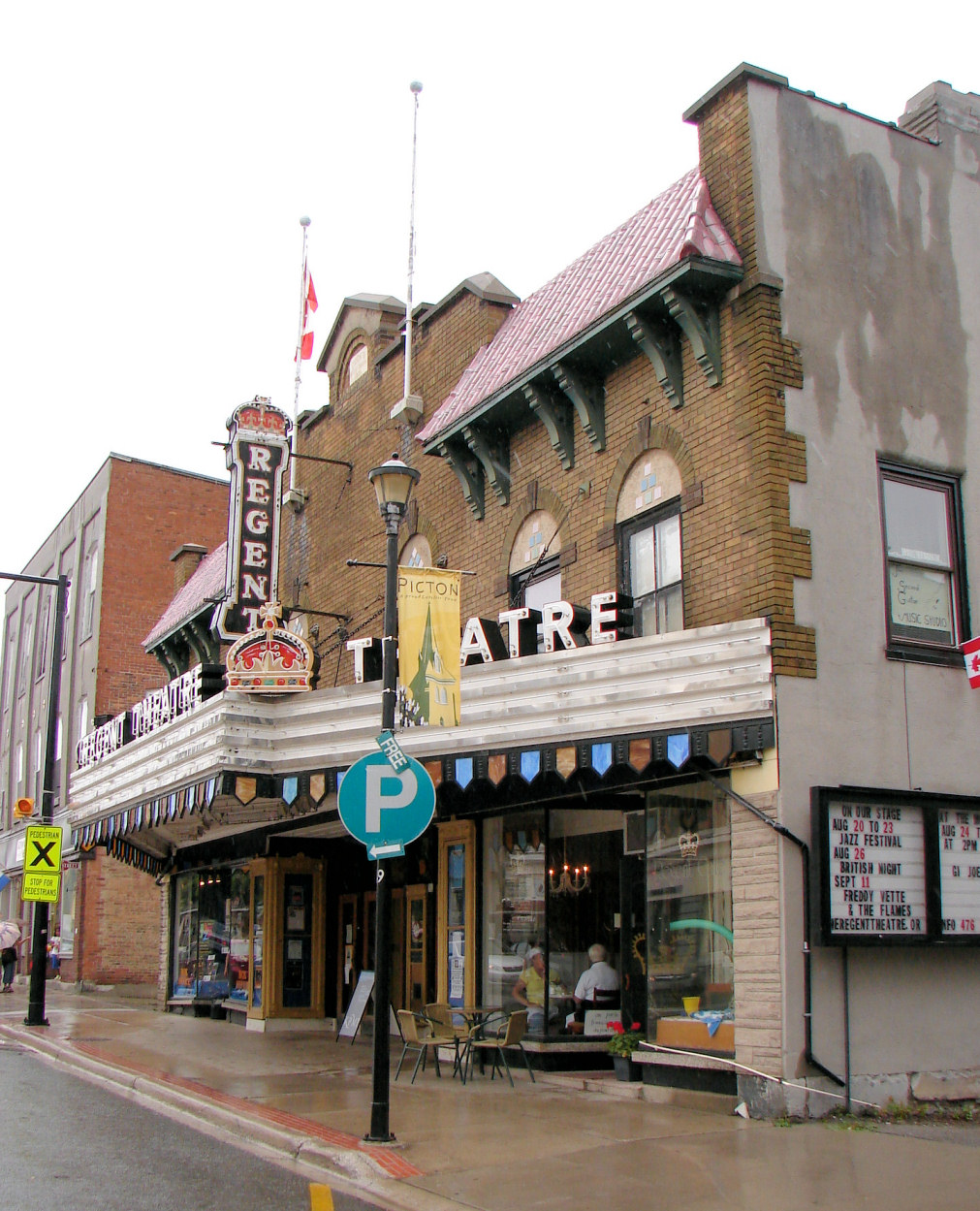
Image of the Regent Theatre (Picton, Ontario)

The Regent Theatre is a theatre located at 224 Main Street in Picton, Ontario. It opened in 1918 and has presented both film and live shows through the years.

Some have referred to the opening of the theatre to be in 1922 but that is when the theatre went through a major renovation where the roof was replaced.

The Regent is a rare example of an Edwardian opera house, with a stage that is as large as that of the Royal Alexandra Theatre in Toronto. It was designed by architects Warrington and Page for George and Ellen Cook, who presented both vaudeville shows and motion pictures there.

The Cooks' daughter, Louise, sold the theatre to the Regent Theatre Foundation in 1994.
