= The Big 3 (folk group) =

American folk trio (1962–1964)

- Origin: Washington, DC, U.S.
- Genres: Folk
- Years active: 1962–1964
- Label: FM
- Past members: Cass Elliot; Tim Rose; Jim Hendricks

The Big 3 was an American folk trio consisting of singer Cass Elliot (1941–1974), singer-songwriter-banjo player Tim Rose (1940–2002), and singer-guitarist Jim Hendricks (b. 1940).

== Career ==
In 1962, Tim Rose and John Brown met Cass Elliot in Georgetown, DC: "After trying a few songs together, they went on the road as The Triumvirate. In Omaha, Nebraska, they recruited James Hendricks before heading for New York City as The Big Three." Brown appears to have been left behind. In New York, the reconfigured trio played coffee houses and folk clubs, including The Bitter End, with sufficient effect to secure spots on national television programs such as The Tonight Show Starring Johnny Carson (1962), Hootenanny (1963), and The Danny Kaye Show (1963). They made twenty-six television appearances in all. Meanwhile, Elliot had married Hendricks to help him avoid the draft; it is said that the union was never consummated. The trio released two albums and two singles before personal and musical differences led to its demise. Rose went solo, and Elliot and Hendricks co-founded The Mugwumps. Later, Elliot went on the join the influential pop group The Mamas and the Papas, then moved to a solo career.

== Discography ==
=== Albums ===
The Big 3 (FM Records, 1963)

1. Rider – 2:30
2. (It Makes) A Long Time Man Feel Bad – 3:28
3. Nora's Dove (Dink's Song) – 1:56
4. Young Girls Lament – 4:13
5. Sing Hallelujah – 2:06
6. Come Along – 1:52
7. Dark As a Dungeon – 3:10
8. The Banjo Song – 1:55
9. Winken, Blinken and Nod – 3:27
10. Ho Honey Oh – 1:29

Live at the Recording Studio (FM Records, 1964)

1. I May Be Right – 2:24
2. Anna Fia (Feher) – 2:44
3. Tony and Delia – 2:30
4. Grandfather's Clock – 1:50
5. Silkie – 3:20
6. Ringo – 2:13
7. Down in the Valley – 2:08
8. Wild Women – 3:01
9. All The Pretty Little Horses – 2:40
10. Glory, Glory – 2:14
11. Come Away Melinda – 3:10

=== Compilations ===
In 1995, Sequel reissued both albums on one CD called The Big 3 Featuring Mama Cass. There are two other compilations with the same name. The first, with eleven tracks, was released by Roulette in 1967 and reissued in 1979; the second, with eighteen tracks, was released by Collectables in 2000.

Essential Folk Masters (Classic Music International, 2011), which is credited to "Mama Cass & The Big Tree" (sic) on the cover, contains the same eighteen tracks as the Collectables compilation in a different order. This is doubly confusing given that after Rose left, Cass, Hendricks and their new bandmates briefly called themselves Mama Cass and the Big 3 before settling on The Mugwumps.

=== Singles ===
- 1963: "The Banjo Song" ("Oh! Susanna") / "Winken, Blinken and Nod" (FM Records)
- 1963: "Come Away Melinda" / "Rider" (FM Records)

Roulette released "Nora's Dove (Dink's Song)" / "Grandfather's Clock" as a single in 1968 to promote its compilation The Big 3 Featuring Mama Cass.
