= Tim Rose =

American musician (1940–2002)

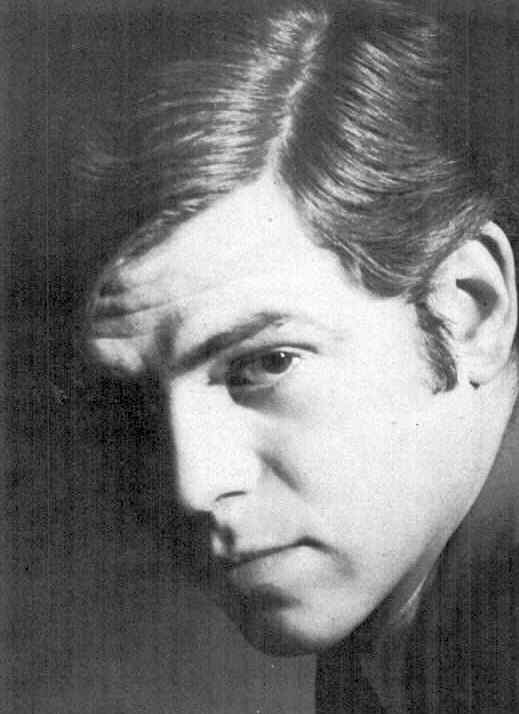
- Rose, c. 1966

Background information
- Born: Timothy Alan Patrick Rose; September 23, 1940; Washington, D.C., U.S.
- Origin: Greenwich Village, New York, U.S.
- Died: September 24, 2002 (aged 62) London, England
- Genres: Rock, folk, blues
- Occupation: Singer-songwriter
- Instruments: Guitar, banjo, vocals
- Years active: 1960s–1978, 1986–2002
- Labels: Columbia, FM, Capitol, Dawn/Playboy, Tiger Lily, Atlantic, Phonogram, President, See for Miles, Best Dressed, Mystic, Love Label, Cherry Red, Market Square

Timothy Alan Patrick Rose (September 23, 1940 – September 24, 2002) was an American singer and songwriter who spent much of his life in London, England, and had more success in Europe than in his native country.

== Biography ==
=== Early years ===
Rose was born in Washington, D.C., and raised by his mother Mary, who worked for the Army Corps of Engineers, his aunt, and his grandmother in an area known as South Fairlington Historic District, in Arlington, Virginia, where he eventually met Scott McKenzie, who lived nearby. Rose learned to play the banjo and guitar, and won the top music award in high school. Rose graduated from Gonzaga College Prep School, a noted Jesuit institution in DC, class of 1958. From there he joined the United States Air Force (in the Strategic Air Command), in the pre-Vietnam era, and was stationed in Kansas. He later worked as a merchant seaman on the S.S. Atlantic and in a bank, before becoming involved in the music industry.

His first band was The Singing Strings, which included his friend McKenzie, who later joined with John Phillips (eventually of The Mamas & the Papas) in a local group called The Abstracts, later The Smoothies and eventually The Journeymen. Other members of the Strings were Buck Hunnicutt, Speery Romig and Alan Stubbs. In 1962, Rose teamed up with ex-Smoothie Michael Boran as Michael and Timothy. Jake Holmes, Rich Husson and Rose formed a group called The Feldmans, later known as Tim Rose and the Thorns.

=== The Big 3 ===
In 1962 Rose met singer Cass Elliot (also eventually of The Mamas & the Papas) at a party in Georgetown and formed a folk trio with her and singer John Brown called The Triumvirate. Later, after Brown was replaced by James (Jim) Hendricks, they changed the name to The Big 3. They soon landed a job at The Bitter End, a folk club in New York City's Greenwich Village.

Their success grew, with appearances on national television programs, and they recorded two albums: The Big 3 (1963) and The Big 3 Live at the Recording Studio (1964). Songs included "Grandfather's Clock", and an anti-war dirge written by Fred Hellerman and Fran Minkoff, "Come Away Melinda", a re-recorded version of which was one of Rose's most successful solo singles several years later, and Rose's composition "The Banjo Song," which sets the lyrics of "Oh! Susanna" to a completely new melody. Rose's melody was then used for Shocking Blue's 1969 hit "Venus". Neil Young and Crazy Horse covered Rose's version on their 2012 album Americana.

Rose and Elliot had musical differences – both were inclined to want things done their way – and the band fell apart after Elliot and Hendricks secretly married. They had appeared on a number of national television programs, including Hootenanny (1963), The Danny Kaye Show (1963), and The Tonight Show Starring Johnny Carson (1962).

=== Solo career ===
After The Big 3, Rose went solo, and by 1966, his prospects had improved. In November of that year, he played two gigs at the Fillmore Auditorium in San Francisco; headlining were the Grateful Dead and Jefferson Airplane. CBS Records signed Rose to a multi-album record deal; the first album, Tim Rose, came out in 1967. It featured a new version of "Come Away Melinda" and "Long Time Man" (a version of the traditional "It Makes a Long Time Man Feel Bad", which was also previously recorded with The Big 3) as well as his versions of two songs that would become standards: Billy Roberts' "Hey Joe" and Bonnie Dobson's "Morning Dew". Both were released as singles, and would be further covered by many artists, from the Grateful Dead to Clannad. Backed up by a trio that included William Lewis Wexler on keyboards and flute, he played at such clubs as Basin Street West in San Francisco and Le Hibou in Ottawa, Ontario. He also played on numerous recording sessions, including backing up, with William Lewis Wexler (on Keyboard), Eric Weissberg.

==== "Hey Joe" ====
In 1966, he was getting a lot of airplay with his version of "Hey Joe". It was written and had been copyrighted in 1962 by singer Billy Roberts, but Rose claimed he heard it sung as a child in Florida, and as of 2009, Rose's official website still claims the song is "traditional". As of 2009 no documentary evidence from US archives or elsewhere has been provided to support the claim that the song is "traditional" (though Country singer Carl Smith did have a hit in 1953 with a song of the same title written by Boudleaux Bryant). Prior to Rose's recording, The Leaves, The Surfaris, Love and The Byrds had all recorded fast-paced versions of the song. Rose's version (crediting himself as author), unlike the others, was a slow, angry ballad, which received US radio airplay and became a regional hit in the San Francisco area in 1966, as well as upstate New York cities like Buffalo and Albany. Jimi Hendrix had seen Rose performing at Cafe Wha? in New York City, and released a similarly slow version in 1966 which became a huge hit, first in the UK, then worldwide. It was Linda Keith, Keith Richards' girlfriend at the time, who played Rose's recording of "Hey Joe" to Chas Chandler (Hendrix's manager and former bass player for The Animals).

Rose re-recorded "Hey Joe" in the 1990s, re-titling it "Blue Steel .44", again claiming songwriting credit.

==== "Morning Dew" ====
"Morning Dew" was written and first recorded by Canadian folk singer Bonnie Dobson. Rose heard Fred Neil's version, then recorded the song with a harder, rock feel and improperly added his name to the song-writing credit. Rose took advantage of a legal loophole to trick Dobson out of the full credit. Legal action in 1998 resulted in the full song-writing credit returning to Dobson. When Fred Neil recorded it, Jac Holzman of Elektra contacted Dobson for permission, knowing she had written it, and that was how it came to be published by Nina Music, the music publishing company set up by Holzman's wife Nina. A roadie introduced Fred Neil's version of the song to Jerry Garcia of the Grateful Dead, who electrified it, recorded it on their debut album in 1967, and played it live many times over nearly three decades, beginning with their performance at the Human Be-In in San Francisco on January 14, 1967. It later became a rock standard.

=== Follow-up works ===
Another CBS album, Through Rose Colored Glasses, followed in 1969. It met with critical disappointment and did not sell well. Love: A Kind of Hate Story was recorded at Island Studios in London and released in 1970. In addition to his musical career, by now Rose had moved to London and would spend much of his life there. Other albums followed in the decade: Another, different album titled Tim Rose (1972), The Musician (1975), and the bootleg Unfinished Song (1976).

In 1968, while his song "Roanoke" was getting some airplay in the UK, Rose was considered while replacements were being selected for Brian Jones's place in The Rolling Stones.

Rose worked in the late 1960s and 1970s with sidemen Bob Bowers, Felix Pappalardi, Alan Seidler, Tina Charles, Pierre Tubbs, B. J. Cole, Colin Winston-Fletcher, Micky Wynne, John Bonham, Les Podraza, Aynsley Dunbar, Alex Damovsky, John McVie, Andy Summers, Eric Weissberg, Russ Kunkel, Randall Elliot, Pete Sears.

In the late 1960s, Shel Talmy worked with Rose, producing his album Love – A Kind of Hate Story.

In 1972, he put together his short-lived LA band featuring: Michael 'Papabax' Baxter on keyboards, Shelly Scott on drums, Bob Zinner on guitar and Larry "Fuzzy" Knight on bass, to play the 'California concert halls and 'nite' spots'.

He appeared on bills with Traffic, The Staple Singers, Stevie Wonder, Simon and Garfunkel, The Doors, Uriah Heep, Johnny Mathis, Frank Zappa, Jimi Hendrix, Jeff Beck, Rod Stewart, Procol Harum, the Grateful Dead, Jimmy Page, Robert Plant, The Band of Joy, and Tim Hardin.

=== The lost years ===
By the mid-1970s, his career had stalled. In an attempted comeback Los Angeles music publisher/songwriter Richard D. Kaye, acting as Rose's manager in 1976, arranged studio time for Rose to record the album Unfinished Song featuring seven new Rose compositions and the title track "Unfinished Song" written by Kaye. He recorded The Gambler in 1977, with a group that included guitarist Andy Summers, only to find that the record company refused to release it. He returned to New York for a number of years, living in Hell's Kitchen on Restaurant Row, and then much later Lincoln Square near Central Park. Having lost his contacts in the music industry, he was forced to work as a construction laborer until an opportunity arose to sing jingles for TV commercials in early 1980. Rose sang on many jingles, including Big Red gum and Wrangler Jeans, and voiced ads for the Big Apple Circus. This work funded his much-delayed college education, which he began at the age of 40. Rose graduated in 1984 from Fordham University at Lincoln Center in Manhattan, with a degree in history. He became a Wall Street stockbroker and a teacher, got married, and eventually divorced. While working on Wall Street, he met Dennis Lepri, former lead guitarist for the folk rock group, Gunhill Road. They became friends and together collaborated on new material, performing in clubs throughout New York. After the 1987 stock market crash, the two parted ways and Rose got out of the stockbroking business. He continued writing and performing at select venues, such as The Bitter End.

=== Return ===
By the late 1980s, Rose had reached the lowest point in his career. After his marriage broke up, he gave up drinking. In 1986, Nick Cave included "Long Time Man", a version very close to Rose's, on the album Your Funeral, My Trial. Cave went on to assist Rose in recovering his career, and encouraged him to play live shows again.

In 1991, The Gambler was finally released. In 1996, encouraged by Cave and by Dutch film makers Suzan IJzermans and Jacques Laureys, he returned to Europe. Rose performed at the Guildford, and Glastonbury Festivals. He went on to perform at the Royal Albert Hall opening for Cave, and at the Shepherds Bush Empire and Queen Elizabeth Hall in London with co-writer and guitarist Mickey Wynne. A new album, Haunted, was released with recordings from these performances as well new studio material produced by Cave. He also appeared on the BBC Television show Later with Jools Holland, and performed with Robert Plant's folk-rock band, Priory of Brion. By the late 1990s to early 2000s, most of his back catalog had been re-released (some as double albums), and were available both in record stores and from Rose's own web site, Tim-Rose.co.uk.

In April 2001, the Tim Rose Band was the opening act at the Bergen Blues and Jazz Festival in Norway. Jacques Laurey's biographical film about Rose, Where Was I?, was premiered at the Rotterdam Film Festival in the same year. His final solo album, American Son, was released in February 2002.

Not Goin' Anywhere by Norwegian band Headwaiter, featuring four songs with lyrics by Rose and a duet with the lead singer Per Jorgenson, was released in Norway in September 2002.

=== Death ===
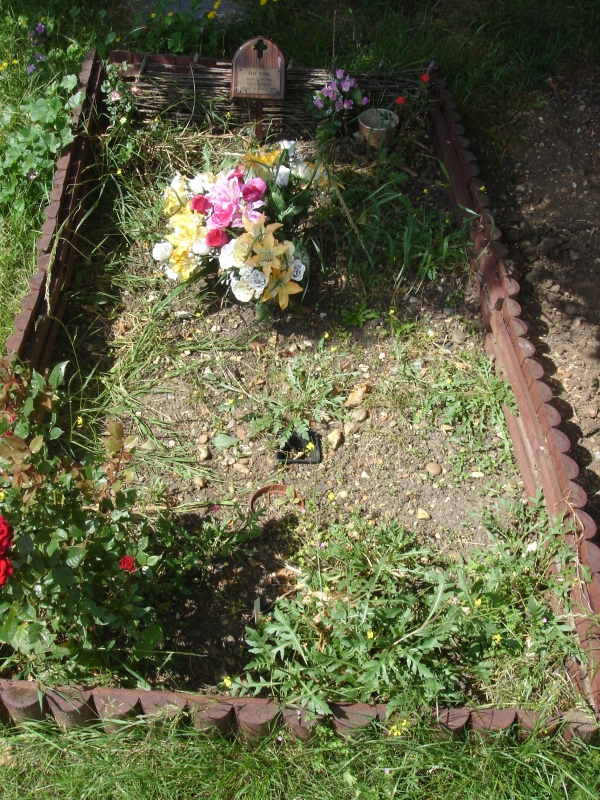
Funerary monument, Brompton Cemetery, London

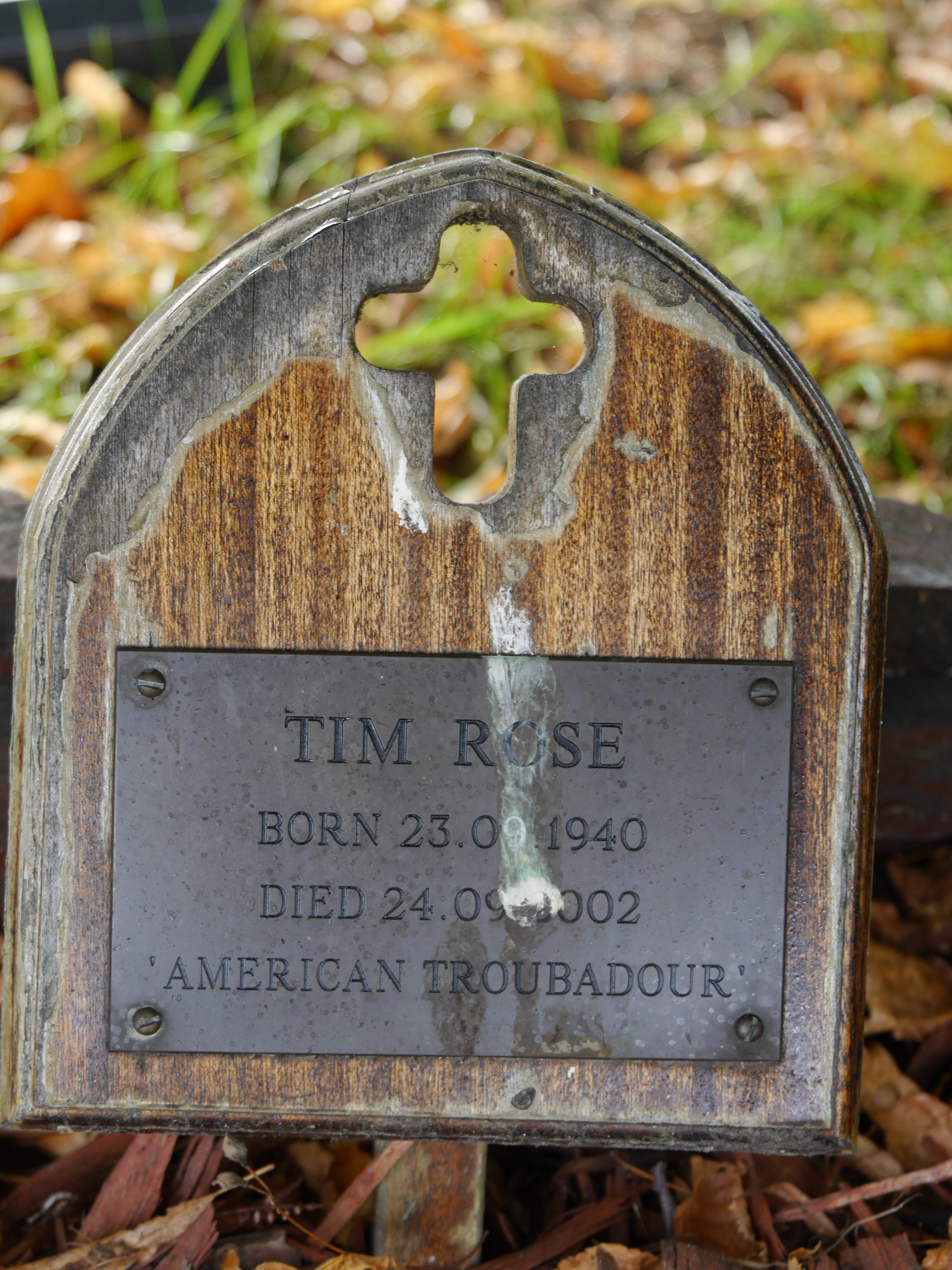
Detail

In 2002, Rose had completed a successful tour of Ireland with co-writer and guitarist Mickey Wynne and had a number of gigs planned around the UK. He died the day after his 62nd birthday at Middlesex Hospital, London of a heart attack during a second operation for a lower bowel problem on September 24, 2002. He is buried in Brompton Cemetery, London.

He had no children. A number of posthumous recordings featuring Rose have since been released.

He was the subject of BBC programme Heir Hunters in November 2011, where investigators look for descendants of deceased people who did not leave a will.

== Discography ==
=== Albums ===
- The Big 3, 1963 – with The Big 3
- The Big 3 Live at the Recording Studio, 1964 – with The Big 3
- Tim Rose, 1967
- Through Rose Colored Glasses, 1969
- Love – A Kind of Hate Story, 1970 (Produced by Shel Talmy)
- Tim Rose, 1972
- The Musician, 1975
- Unfinished Song, 1976
- The Gambler, 1991
- I've Got to Get a Message to You, 1987
- Haunted, 1997
- American Son, 2002
- Not Goin' Anywhere, 2002 – with Headwaiter
- Snowed In (The Last Recordings), 2003
- The London Sessions 1978 – 1998, 2004
- Mirage, 2004

=== Singles ===
- 1966 – "I'm Bringing It Home" / "Mother, Father, Where are You?"
- 1966 – "Hey Joe" / "King Lonely the Blue"
- 1966 – "I Gotta Do Things My Way" / "Where Was I?"
- 1966 – "I'm Gonna Be Strong" / "I Got a Loneliness"
- 1967 – "Morning Dew" / "You're Slipping Away from Me"
- 1967 – "Long Time Man" / "I Got a Loneliness"
- 1967 – "Come Away Melinda" / "Long Time Man"
- 1968 – "Long Haired Boy" / "Looking at My Baby"
- 1968 – "I Guess it's Over" / "Hello Sunshine"
- 1969 – "Roanoke" / "Baby You Turn Me On"
- 1970 – "I Gotta Get a Message to You" / "Ode to an Old Ball"
- 1972 – "You've Got to Hide Your Love Away" / "If I Were a Carpenter"
- 1973 – "You've Got to Hide Your Love Away" / "It Takes a Little Longer"
- 1975 – "The Musician" / "7:30 Song"
- 1975 – "The Musician" / "It's Not My Life That's Been Changin'"
- 1975 – "Morning Dew" / "7:30 Song"
- 1979 - Rose guested on the single "Boys on the Dole" by Neville Wanker and the Punters
