= Cass Elliot =

American singer (1941–1974)

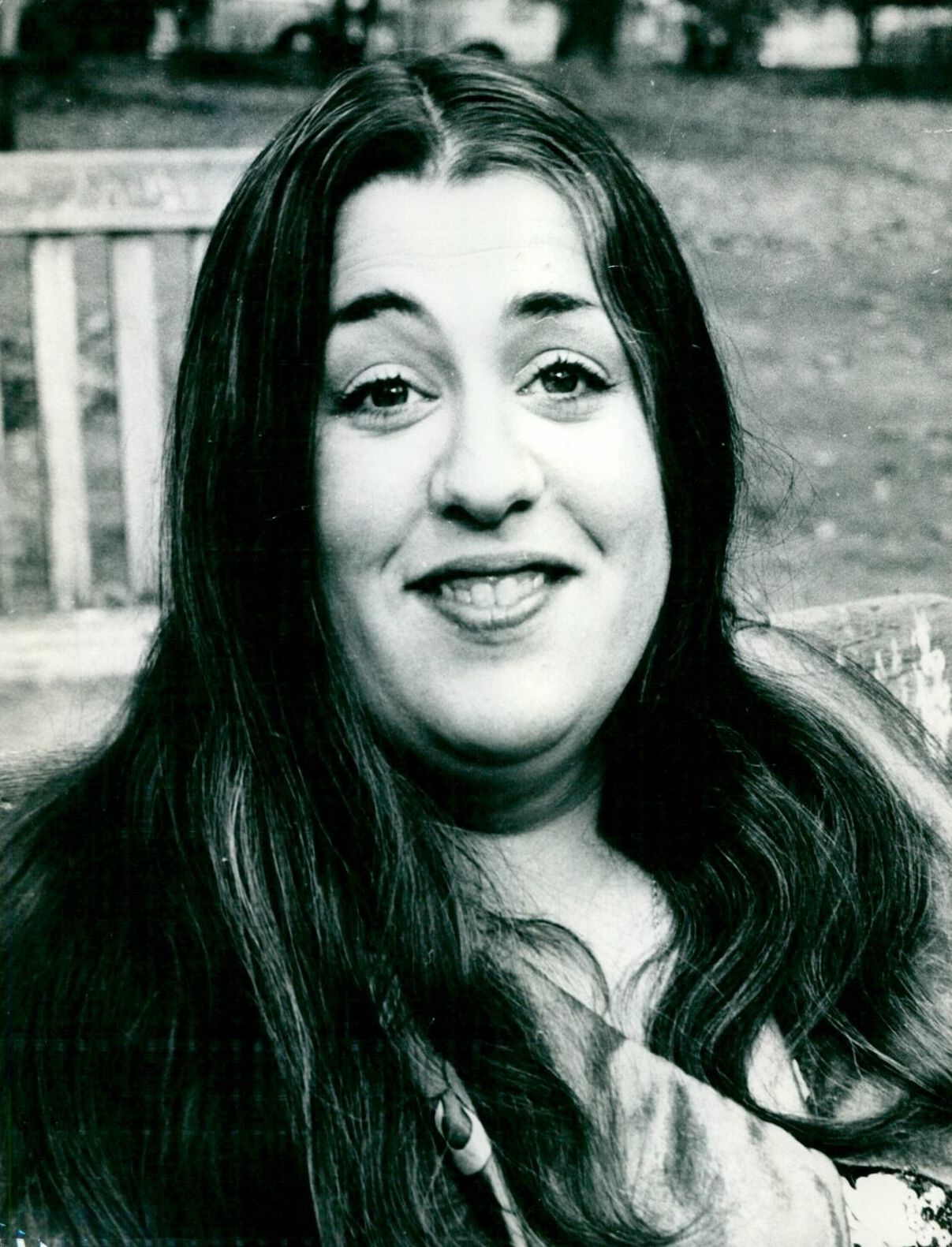
- Elliot in 1973
- Born: Ellen Naomi Cohen; September 19, 1941; Baltimore, Maryland, U.S.
- Died: July 29, 1974 (aged 32); Mayfair, London, England
- Resting place: Mount Sinai Memorial Park
- Other names: Mama Cass, the Queen of Laurel Canyon
- Education: American University
- Occupations: Singer; actress; comedian
- Title: Baroness von Wiedenman (1971)
- Spouses: James Hendricks (m. 1963; ann. 1968); Donald von Wiedenman (m. 1971; div. 1971)
- Children: 1
- Relatives: Leah Kunkel (sister)
- Musical career
- Genres: Folk rock; sunshine pop
- Instrument: Vocals
- Years active: 1959–1974
- Labels: FM; Dunhill; RCA
- Formerly of: The Triumvirate; the Big 3; the Mamas & the Papas; the Mugwumps
- Website: casselliot.com

Ellen Naomi Cohen (September 19, 1941 – July 29, 1974), known professionally as Cass Elliot, was an American singer-songwriter, actress, comedian, and television personality. A member of the singing group The Mamas & the Papas (1965–1968), she was also known as "Mama Cass", a name she stated she disliked. After the group broke up, Elliot released five solo albums. She received the Grammy Award for Best Contemporary (R&R) Performance for "Monday, Monday" (1967). In 1998, she was posthumously inducted into the Rock and Roll Hall of Fame for her work with The Mamas & the Papas.

== Early life and education ==
Ellen Naomi Cohen was born on September 19, 1941 in Baltimore, Maryland, the daughter of Philip Cohen (1916–1962) and Bess Cohen (née Levine; 1915–1994). She was Jewish with all four of her grandparents being Russian-Jewish immigrants. Her family was subject to significant financial stresses and uncertainties during her childhood years. Her father, involved in several business ventures, ultimately succeeded with the development of a lunch wagon in Baltimore that provided meals to construction workers. Her mother was a trained nurse. Elliot had a brother, Joseph, and a younger sister, Leah, who also became a singer and recording artist. Elliot's early life was spent with her family in Alexandria, Virginia, and when she was 15, the family moved back to Baltimore, where they had briefly lived at the time of Elliot's birth.

Elliot adopted the name "Cass" in high school, possibly borrowing it from actress Peggy Cass, according to Denny Doherty. She assumed the surname "Elliot" some time later, in memory of a friend who had died. While in Alexandria, she attended George Washington High School. When Elliot's family returned to Baltimore, she attended Forest Park High School. While attending Forest Park High School, Elliot became interested in acting. She won a small part in the play The Boy Friend, a summer stock production at the Hilltop Theatre in Owings Mills, Maryland. She left high school shortly before graduation and moved to New York City to further her acting career (as recounted in the lyrics to "Creeque Alley").

== Career ==
=== 1962–1964: Early career ===
After leaving high school to pursue an entertainment career in New York, Elliot toured in the musical The Music Man in 1962 under the name Cass Elliot, but lost the part of Miss Marmelstein in I Can Get It for You Wholesale to Barbra Streisand. Elliot sometimes sang while working as a cloakroom attendant at The Showplace in Greenwich Village, but she did not pursue a singing career until she moved to the Washington, DC, area to attend American University (not Swarthmore College as mentioned in the biographical song "Creeque Alley").

America's folk music scene was on the rise when Elliot met banjoist and singer Tim Rose and singer John Brown, and the three began performing as the Triumvirate. In 1963, James Hendricks replaced Brown, and the trio was renamed the Big 3. Elliot's first recording with the Big 3 was "Winken, Blinken, and Nod", released by FM Records in 1963. In 1964, the group appeared on an "open mic" night at The Bitter End in Greenwich Village, billed as Cass Elliot and the Big 3, followed onstage by folk singer Jim Fosso and bluegrass banjoist Eric Weissberg.

Tim Rose left the Big 3 in 1964, and Elliot and Hendricks teamed with Canadians Zal Yanovsky and Denny Doherty to form the Mugwumps. This group lasted eight months, after which Cass performed as a solo act for a while. In the meantime, Yanovsky and John Sebastian co-founded the Lovin' Spoonful, while Doherty joined the New Journeymen, a group that also included John Phillips and his wife Michelle Phillips. In 1965, Doherty persuaded John Phillips that Elliot should join the group, which she did while the group members and she were vacationing in the Virgin Islands.

A popular legend about Elliot is that her vocal range was improved by three notes after she was hit on the head by some copper tubing while walking through a construction site behind the bar where the New Journeymen were playing in the Virgin Islands. Elliot confirmed the story in a 1968 interview with Rolling Stone, saying:

It's true, I did get hit on the head by a pipe that fell down and my range was increased by three notes. They were tearing this club apart in the islands, revamping it, putting in a dance floor. Workmen dropped a thin metal plumbing pipe and it hit me on the head and knocked me to the ground. I had a concussion and went to the hospital. I had a bad headache for about two weeks and all of a sudden I was singing higher. It's true. Honest to God.

=== 1965–1968: The Mamas & the Papas ===
With two female members, the New Journeymen needed a new name. According to Doherty, Elliot came up with the name The Mamas & the Papas. Elliot was known for her sense of humor and optimism, and was considered by many to be the most charismatic member of the group. Her powerful, distinctive voice was a major factor in their string of hits, including "California Dreamin'", "Monday, Monday", and "Words of Love". She also performed the solo "Dream a Little Dream of Me" (Note: Credited as "Featuring Mama Cass with the Mamas and the Papas"), which the group recorded in 1968 after learning about the death of Fabian Andre, one of the men who co-wrote it. Elliot's version is noteworthy for its contemplative pace, whereas many earlier recordings of "Dream a Little Dream of Me" (including one by Nat King Cole and another by Ozzie Nelson) had been up-tempo versions—the song having been written in 1931 as a dance tune. The Mamas & the Papas lasted from 1965 to 1968, with a brief reunion in 1971.

=== 1968–1973: Solo career ===
After the breakup of The Mamas and & Papas, Elliot embarked on a solo singing career. Her most successful recording during this period was 1968's "Dream a Little Dream of Me" from her solo album of the same name, released by Dunhill Records, though it had originally been released earlier that year on the album The Papas & The Mamas.

==== Las Vegas show ====
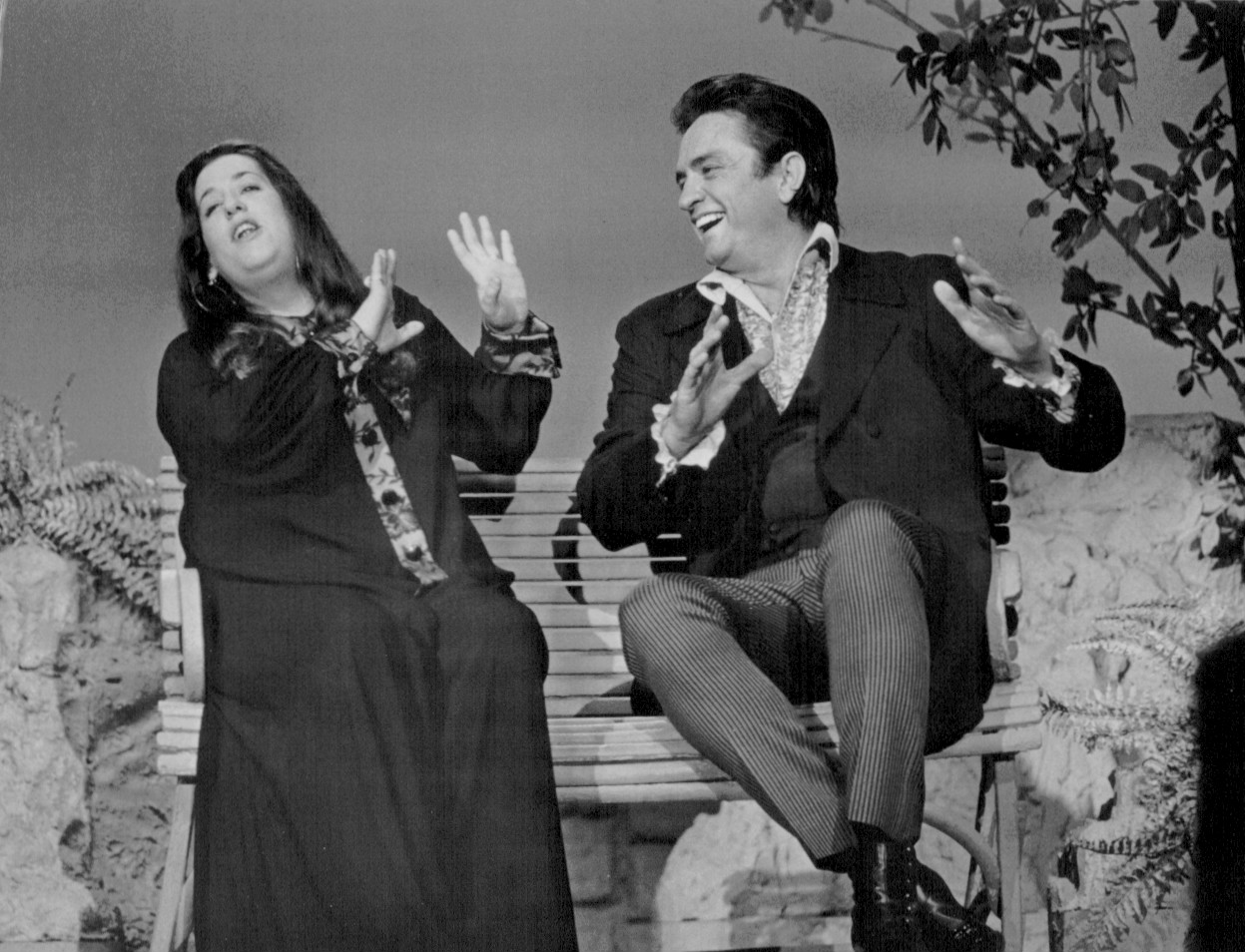
Elliot with Johnny Cash in 1969

In October 1968, Elliot made her live solo debut headlining in Las Vegas at Caesars Palace, scheduled for a three-week engagement at $40,000 per week with two shows per night. According to Elliot, she went on a six-month crash diet before the show, losing 100 of her 300 pounds. However, she attributed a stomach ulcer and throat problems to her severe regimen, which she treated by drinking milk and cream—rapidly regaining 50 pounds in the process.

She was confined to her bed for three weeks before the first performance while the musical director, band, and production supervisor attempted to put together a show in her absence. She was scheduled to rehearse for a full three days before the show opened, but she managed to get through only part of one run-through with the band before saying that she was losing her voice. She skipped the remainder of rehearsals and drank tea and lemon, hoping to recover and pull herself together for opening night.

An audience of 950 people filled the Circus Maximus theater at Caesar's Palace on the evening of Wednesday, October 16, including Sammy Davis Jr., Peter Lawford, Jimi Hendrix, Joan Baez, Liza Minnelli, and Mia Farrow, who had sent flowers to Elliot's dressing room, but backstage she had developed a raging fever. Friends urged her manager to cancel the show, but she felt that it was too important and insisted on performing. Sick and having barely rehearsed, she began to fall apart during the course of her first performance; her voice was weak and barely audible, and the large crowd was unsympathetic, despite the celebrity well-wishers. At the end of the show, Elliot returned to the stage to apologize to the audience; "This is the first night, and it will get better", she said. She then sang "Dream a Little Dream of Me" and left the stage as the audience applauded half-heartedly. She returned later that night to perform the second show, but her voice was worse, and many of the audience noisily walked out.

Reviews were harsh. Esquire magazine called the show "Sink Along with Cass" and "a disaster" that was "heroic in proportion, epic in scope". The Los Angeles Free Press called it "an embarrassing drag", while Newsweek compared it to the Titanic disaster: "Like some great ocean liner embarking on an ill-fated maiden voyage, Mama Cass slid down the waves and sank to the bottom". The show closed after only one night, and Elliot flew back to Los Angeles for what was described as "a tonsillectomy".

Within hours of the end of Elliot's Las Vegas concert, rumors began to spread that she had been taking drugs during the weeks leading up to it. Eddi Fiegel wrote in the biography Dream a Little Dream of Me that Elliot later admitted to a boyfriend that she had injected heroin immediately before going on stage. Embarrassed by the debacle, Elliot plunged into a deep depression.

==== Later work ====
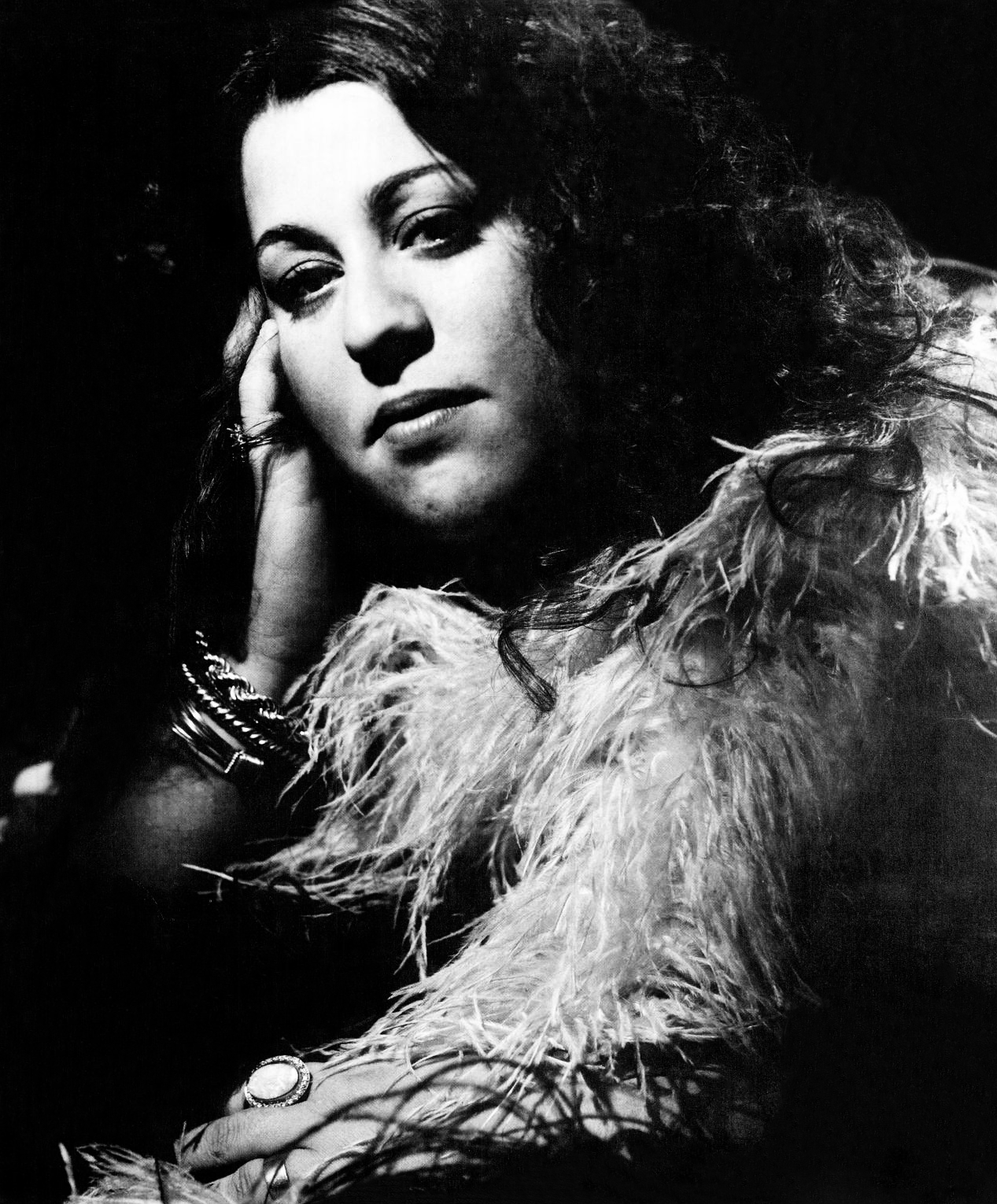
Elliot in 1972, for her album Cass Elliot

Elliot appeared in two television variety specials: The Mama Cass Television Program (ABC, 1969) and Don't Call Me Mama Anymore (CBS, 1973). She was a regular guest on TV talk shows and variety shows in the early 1970s, including The Mike Douglas Show, The Andy Williams Show, Hollywood Squares, The Johnny Cash Show, The Ray Stevens Show, The Smothers Brothers Comedy Hour, and The Carol Burnett Show, and was a guest panelist for a week on the game show Match Game '73. She guest-hosted for Johnny Carson on The Tonight Show and appeared as a guest on the show 13 other times. She also appeared on and co-hosted The Music Scene on ABC and was featured on the first The Midnight Special on NBC.

Elliot performed the title song "The Good Times Are Comin'" during the opening sequence of the 1970 film Monte Walsh, starring Lee Marvin and Jack Palance. In 1970, Elliot was signed to RCA Records; her first album for RCA, Cass Elliot, was issued in January, 1972. Also in 1972, she made three appearances on the variety series The Julie Andrews Hour. Her final appearance on the show was the Christmas installment that aired on Wednesday, December 20, 1972. In December 1978, four years after Elliot's death, the episode was rebroadcast on syndicated stations as a Christmas special titled Merry Christmas with Love, Julie. However, all of Elliot's solos were deleted from the syndicated edit. In 2009, a complete videotape of The Julie Andrews Hour Christmas Show was donated to The Paley Center For Media in New York, with all of Elliot's numbers intact.

In 1973, Elliot performed in Saga of Sonora, a TV music-comedy-Western special with Jill St. John, Vince Edwards, Zero Mostel, and Lesley Ann Warren. She also sang the jingle "Hurry on down to Hardee's, where the burgers are charco-broiled" for Hardee's advertisements. Throughout the early 1970s, Elliot continued her acting career, as well. She had a featured role in the movie Pufnstuf (1970) and made guest appearances on TV's The New Scooby-Doo Movies; Young Dr. Kildare; Love, American Style; and The Red Skelton Show; among others.

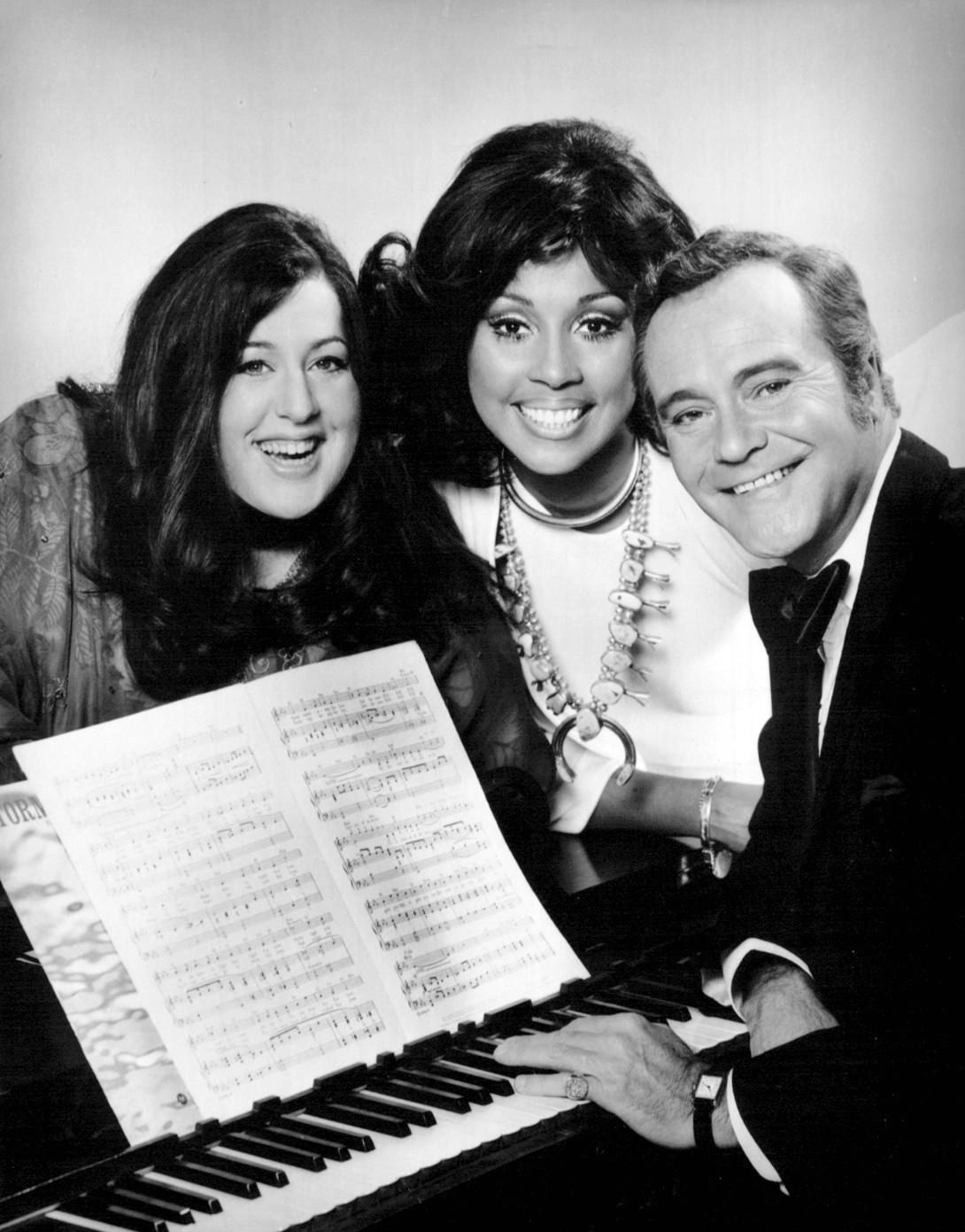
From left to right: Elliot, Diahann Carroll and Jack Lemmon in 1973

In 1973, Elliot hired as her manager Allan Carr, who was also managing the careers of Tony Curtis, Ann-Margret, and Peter Sellers. Carr felt Elliot needed to leave pop and rock music and head into the cabaret circuit, so a show was put together comprising old standards along with a few new songs written for her by friends. The act included Elliot and two male singers who served as backup singers and sidekicks during the musical numbers. The title of the show was Don't Call Me Mama Anymore, named after one of the songs written by Elliot's friend Earle Brown. The song was born out of Elliot's frustration with being identified as "Mama Cass". The show debuted in Pittsburgh on February 9, 1973. Elliot felt ready to tackle Las Vegas once again and premiered at the Flamingo. This time, she received rave reviews. The Las Vegas Sun wrote, "Cass Elliot, making a strong point that she is no longer Mama Cass, has a good act serving notice that she is here to stay. The audience was with her all the way ... no empty seats anywhere." She then took her act to higher-echelon casinos and swankier nightclubs in cities throughout the country.

Elliot provided the voice for her appearance on the 1973 episode of The New Scooby-Doo Movies, "The Haunted Candy Factory". Decades after her death, her character reappeared in Scooby-Doo! Mystery Incorporated in cameo form, in the episodes "The Secret Serum", "Pawn of Shadows", and "Dance of the Undead" as a Crystal Cove citizen.

The city of Baltimore dedicated August 15, 1973, as "Cass Elliot Day" in her honor for her homecoming.

== Final performances, death, and funeral ==
On April 22, 1974, Elliot collapsed in the California television studio of The Tonight Show Starring Johnny Carson immediately before her scheduled appearance on the show. She was treated at a hospital and released, then dismissed the incident as simple exhaustion in interviews and during her May 7 conversation with Carson at his show’s studio.

Soon after Elliot videotaped an appearance on the syndicated Mike Douglas Show, which originated from Philadelphia, she began two weeks of solo concerts at the London Palladium. She felt elated by the standing ovation she received on the last night of the engagement, which was Saturday night, July 27. She made an international phone call to Michelle Phillips, during which Elliot cried from happiness over her success at the Palladium, as Phillips has stated in numerous interviews. Elliot began a 24-hour celebration. She first attended the 31st birthday party of Mick Jagger at his home on Tite Street in Chelsea, London. After the party, Elliot went to a brunch in her honor presented by Georgia Brown. While there, according to biographer Eddi Fiegel, Elliot was blowing her nose frequently, coughing and having trouble breathing. Next, she attended a cocktail party hosted by American entertainment journalist Jack Martin. She seemed in high spirits but also appeared physically exhausted and sick. Elliot left that party at 8:00 p.m. on Sunday, July 28, saying she was tired and needed to get some sleep.

Elliot retired to an apartment at Flat 12, 9 Curzon Place (later Curzon Square) in the Mayfair district of Central London, owned by singer-songwriter Harry Nilsson, who allowed her to stay there. Later that night, Elliot died in her sleep at age 32. According to Keith Simpson, who conducted her autopsy, she died of a heart attack, and there were no drugs in her system. Four years later, Keith Moon, drummer for the Who, died in the same bedroom, also aged 32 years.

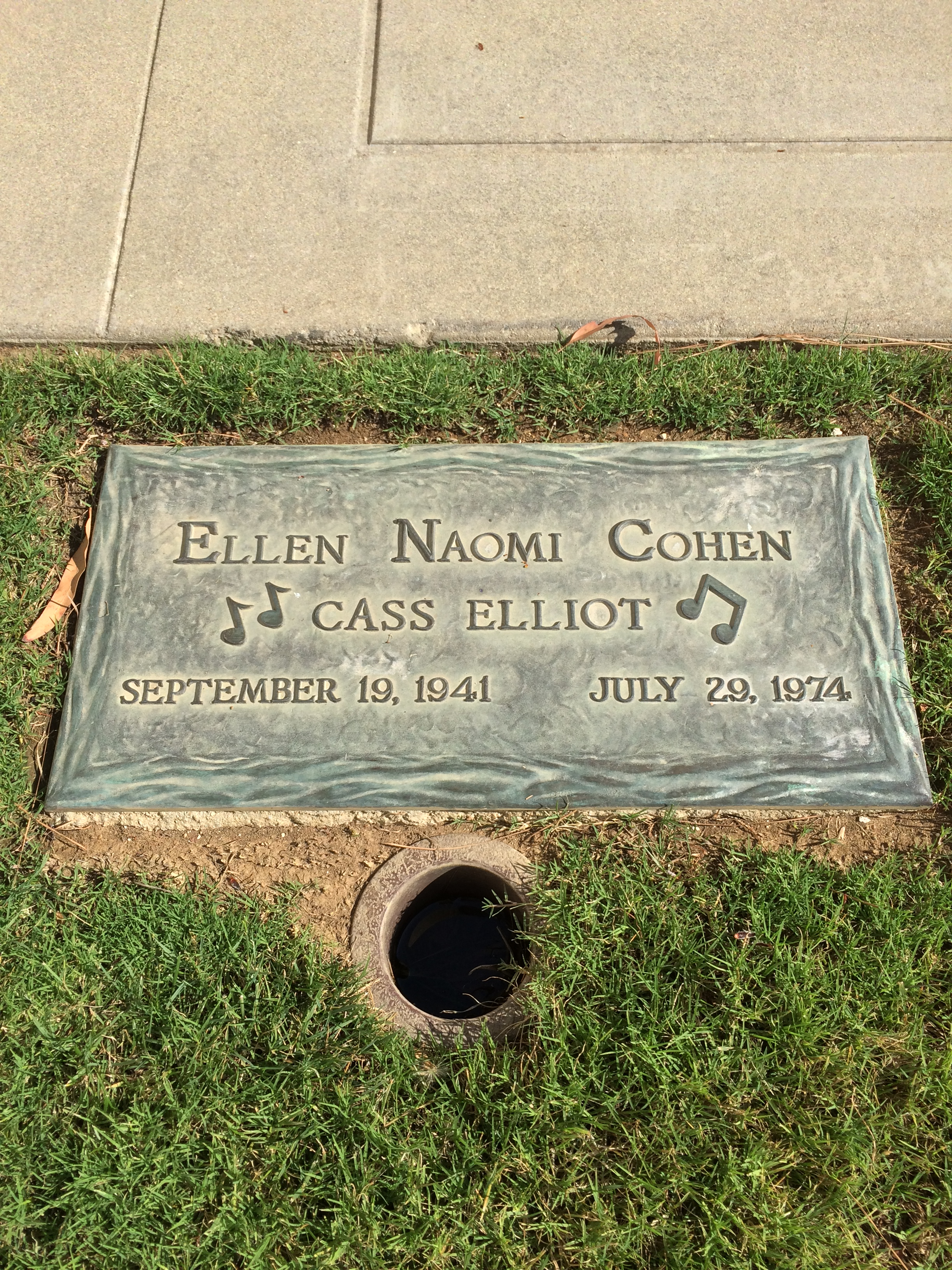
Cass Elliot's grave in Mount Sinai Memorial Park Cemetery in Los Angeles

Early news reports, which included quotes from her personal physician, indicated that she most likely choked on a ham sandwich. Elliot did not die from choking on a ham sandwich, as has been alleged. According to Lindsay Zoladz writing in The New York Times in 2024, this "cartoonish rumor ... cast a tawdry light over Elliot's legacy and still threatens to overshadow her mighty, underappreciated talent." In 2020, a journalist and friend of Elliot's, Sue Cameron, publicly admitted that she promulgated the false ham sandwich story by writing it into Elliot's obituary for The Hollywood Reporter. She claimed she was asked to print the lie by Elliot's manager Allan Carr, who decided that the humiliating falsehood was preferable to any implication that Elliot's death was associated with substance abuse. However she did have fatty degeneration of the heart, possibly caused by a combination of obesity, crash dieting, and drug use.

Elliot's body was cremated at the Hollywood Forever Cemetery in Los Angeles, California. Her ashes were later buried in Mount Sinai Memorial Park Cemetery in Los Angeles.

== Personal life ==
=== Marriages and family ===
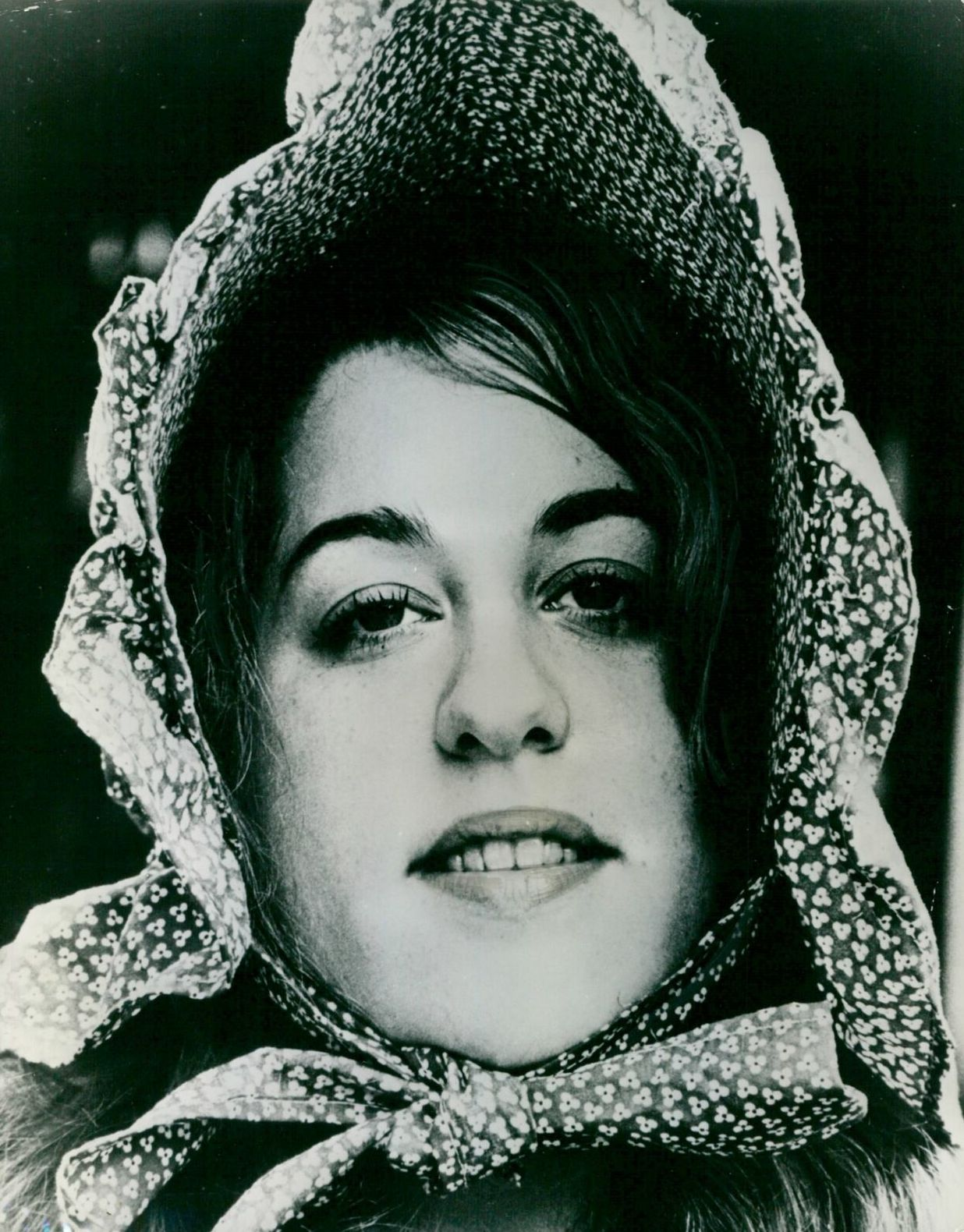
Elliot in 1969

Elliot was married twice, the first time in 1963 to Jim Hendricks, her groupmate in the Big 3 and the Mugwumps. It was a marriage of convenience to assist him in avoiding being drafted during the Vietnam War; the marriage was never consummated and was annulled in 1968. In 1971, Elliot married journalist Donald von Wiedenman, heir to a Bavarian barony.

Elliot gave birth to a daughter on April 26, 1967. Cass Elliot never publicly identified the father but many years later, Michelle Phillips helped the daughter locate her biological father, Chuck Day. His paternity was not publicly revealed until his 2008 death. After Elliot's death, her younger sister, Leah Kunkel (then married to Los Angeles–based session drummer Russ Kunkel), was awarded custody of the seven-year-old child and raised her.

=== Drug use ===
David Crosby published a memoir in 1988 saying he used opiates and cocaine with Elliot, preferring heroin in London because of its availability in pharmacies there.

=== 1967 legal issue ===
In 1967, while staying in London, Elliot was prosecuted for stealing bed linen from a hotel where she and her bandmates had stayed on an earlier visit. She denied responsibility, and the case was brought before the West London magistrates' court, where the charges against her were dismissed in the absence of any evidence. The Mamas & the Papas were forced to cancel their upcoming British concerts as a result of the incident, and the band broke up the following year. On a return visit to London, Elliot admitted to the audience at the London Palladium that she had taken two sheets, saying "I liked 'em so I took 'em". She said she had kept quiet because of the way she had been treated in police custody.

== Awards and nominations ==
Year	Award	Category	Project	Result	Ref.
1967	Grammy Award	Record of the Year	Monday, Monday	Nominated	
1967	Grammy Award	Best Performance By A Vocal Group	Monday, Monday	Nominated	
1967	Grammy Award	Best Contemporary (R&R) Recording	Monday, Monday	Nominated	
1967	Grammy Award	Best Contemporary (R&R) Group Performance, Vocal Or Instrumental	Monday, Monday	Won	

== Commemoration ==
Elliot received the 2,735th star on the Hollywood Walk of Fame on October 3, 2022.

The British play and film Beautiful Thing feature her recordings, and one character reflects on her memories of Elliot. Elliot was the subject of a 2004 stage production in Dublin, The Songs of Mama Cass, with Kristin Kapelli performing main vocals. Elliot was portrayed by Shannon Lee in the Bruce Lee biopic Dragon: The Bruce Lee Story. She was portrayed by Rachel Redleaf in the 2019 film Once Upon a Time in Hollywood.

The Crosby, Stills & Nash Daylight Again video released in 1982 was dedicated to Cass Elliot as was the Crosby, Stills & Nash Greatest Hits album released in 2005.

Elliot's recording of "Make Your Own Kind of Music" is featured prominently in several episodes of seasons two and three of Lost as well as season eight, episodes two and nine of Dexter (the later one also uses the title as the episode's title). It was also featured in ABC's The Middle when Sue Heck graduates from high school and in Netflix's Sex Education when Aimee smashes up an abandoned car. Her recording of "It's Getting Better" is featured in a season-four episode of Lost.

In February 2026 it was announced that a movie based on Elliot’s life was in production. The movie will be titled “My Mama, Cass” sharing the same name as the book written by Elliot’s daughter, Owen Vanessa Elliot. English actress Jessica Gunning is set to portray Elliot.

== Discography ==
=== Albums ===
The Big 3

- 1963: The Big 3
- 1964: Live at the Recording Studio

The Mugwumps

- 1967: The Mugwumps

The Mamas & the Papas

Solo

Year	Album	Peak positions		Notes
Year	Album	US 200	US CB	Notes
1968	Dream a Little Dream	87	46	
1969	Bubblegum, Lemonade, and... Something for Mama	91	82	
1969	Make Your Own Kind of Music	169	90	Reissue of Bubblegum, Lemonade - with the hit title song added.
1970	Mama's Big Ones	194	—	
1971	Dave Mason & Cass Elliot	49	—	with Dave Mason
1972	Cass Elliot	—	—	
1972	The Road Is No Place for a Lady	—	—	
1973	Don't Call Me Mama Anymore	—	—	Recorded Live
"—" indicates the album did not chart

"-" indicates the album did not chart or was not released in that territory.

Soundtracks

- 1970: Pufnstuf (soundtrack with Mama Cass)
- 1971: "The Costume Ball" from Doctor's Wives
- 1996: Beautiful Thing (soundtrack with Mama Cass and The Mamas & the Papas)

Compilations

==== Vinyl ====
- 1967: The Big Three Featuring Mama Cass (Roulette)
- 1974: Dream a Little Dream of Me (Pickwick)
- 1975: Mama Cass (Pickwick)

==== Cassette ====
- 1985: Dream a Little Dream of Me (MCA)
- 1985: The Best of Mama Cass (MCA)

==== CD ====
- 1995: The Big 3 Featuring Mama Cass Elliot (Sequel)
- 1997: Dream a Little Dream: The Cass Elliot Collection (MCA)
- 2000: The Big 3 Featuring Mama Cass (Collectables)
- 2002: Dedicated to the One I Love (Universal)
- 2005: Dream a Little Dream of Me: The Music of Mama Cass Elliot (Universal)
- 2005: The Solo Collection 1968-71 (Hip-O Select)
- 2009: Cass Elliot / The Road Is No Place For a Lady (Sony)
- 2010: Cass Elliot / The Road Is No Place For a Lady / Don't Call Me Mama Anymore (BGO)

Videos

==== DVD ====
- 2009: The Mama Cass Television Program (Infinity)
- 2016: The Cass Elliot Specials (TJL/Treasury Collection)

==== Music video ====
- 2023: Make Your Own Kind of Music

=== Singles ===
Year	Single	Chart Positions								Certifications	Album
Year	Single	US	US AC	CAN	CAN AC	UK	IRE	AUS	US CB	Certifications	Album
1968	"Dream a Little Dream of Me" b/w "Midnight Voyage"; Listed as "Mama Cass with the Mamas & the Papas"	12	2	7	-	11	13	1	10		A & B: The Papas & The Mamas; A: Dream a Little Dream
1968	"California Earthquake" b/w "Talkin' to Your Toothbrush"	67	-	51	-	-	-	94	74		Dream a Little Dream
1969	"Move in a Little Closer, Baby" b/w "All for Me" (non-album track)	58	32	55	19	-	-	34	59		Bubblegum, Lemonade, and... Something for Mama
1969	"It's Getting Better" b/w "Who's to Blame"	30	13	31	7	8	3	53	35		Bubblegum, Lemonade, and... Something for Mama
1969	"Make Your Own Kind of Music" b/w "Lady Love"	36	6	20	7	-	-	72	25	BPI: Silver	Make Your Own Kind of Music
1970	"New World Coming" b/w "Blow Me a Kiss" (from Make Your Own Kind of Music)	42	4	22	4	-	-	-	30		Mama's Big Ones
1970	"A Song That Never Comes" b/w "I Can Dream, Can't I" (from Make Your Own Kind Of Music)	99	25	-	-	-	-	71	-		Mama's Big Ones
1970	"The Good Times Are Coming" b/w "Welcome to the World" (from Make Your Own Kind Of Music)	104	19	-	8	-	-	-	-		Mama's Big Ones
1970	"Don't Let the Good Life Pass You By" b/w "A Song That Never Comes"	110	34	-	-	-	-	-	-		Mama's Big Ones
1971	"Something to Make You Happy" b/w "Next to You"; Both sides with Dave Mason	-	-	-	-	-	-	-	-		Dave Mason & Cass Elliot
1971	"Too Much Truth, Too Much Love" b/w "Walk to the Point"; Both sides with Dave Mason	-	-	-	-	-	-	-	-		Dave Mason & Cass Elliot
1972	"Baby I'm Yours" b/w "Cherries Jubilee"	-	-	-	18	-	-	-	-		Cass Elliot
1972	"That Song" b/w "When It Doesn't Work Out"	-	-	-	-	-	-	-	-		Cass Elliot
1972	"(If You're Gonna) Break Another Heart" b/w "Disney Girls" (from Cass Elliot)	-	-	-	-	54	-	-	-		The Road Is No Place for a Lady
1972	"Does Anybody Love You" b/w "The Road Is No Place for a Lady"	-	-	-	-	-	-	-	-		The Road Is No Place for a Lady
1973	"I Think a Lot About You" b/w "Listen to the World" (non-album track)	-	-	-	-	-	-	-	-		Don't Call Me Mama Anymore
