= Oklahoma! (original Broadway cast recording) =

Cast recording by members of the original New York production
- Released: 1943
- Genre: Show tunes
- Label: Decca

Professional ratings
Review scores
Source	Rating
AllMusic	4.5/5 stars

Oklahoma! / Show Boat – Original Casts (1996 CD)
Review scores
Source	Rating
AllMusic	4/5 stars

Selections from the Theatre Guild musical play "Oklahoma!" featuring members of the original New York production, or simply Oklahoma!, is an album containing the original studio cast recording of the 1943 Broadway musical Oklahoma!. It was released by Decca Records on December 1, 1943.

The album was commercially successful and paved the way for future "original cast albums" of musicals.

== Release ==
The album was originally issued as a set of six 10-inch 78-rpm phonograph records (cat. no. A-359). It contained 12 songs across 12 sides.

In 1949, the album was made available on LP (cat. no. DL 8000).

== Reception ==
William Ruhlmann (AllMusic) credits this album with "establishing the popularity of original cast albums". He explains that "although there had been a tradition of recording music from stage works in their original form with the stage performers in Great Britain, such recordings were only occasional in the U.S." Therefore, "the idea of putting together an album of several 78-rpm records containing a show's major songs as performed on-stage was relatively new." According to him, the album's huge commercial success "forever changed the record business" and laid the foundation for the future "domination of record sales by the cast and soundtrack albums" that lasted 20 years.

The album was added to the National Recording Registry as being "culturally or historically significant".

== Track listing ==
Album of six 10-inch 78-rpm phonograph records (Decca A-359)

All lyrics are written by Richard Rodgers; all music is composed by Oscar Hammerstein II.

Side 1
No.	Title	Artist(s)	Length
1.	"Oklahoma overture" (1) "The Farmer and the Cow Man" (2) "Pore Jud Is Daid" (3) "Many a New Day" (4) "People Will Say We're in Love" (5) "Oklahoma"	Oklahoma orchestra

Side 2
No.	Title	Artist(s)	Length
1.	"Oh, What a Beautiful Morning" (Act 1—Scene 1)	Alfred Drake with Oklahoma orchestra

Side 3
No.	Title	Artist(s)	Length
1.	"The Surrey with the Fringe on Top" (Act 1—Scene 1)	Alfred Drake with Oklahoma orchestra

Side 4
No.	Title	Artist(s)	Length
1.	"Kansas City" (Act 1—Scene 1)	Lee Dixon with Oklahoma male chorus and orchestra

Side 5
No.	Title	Artist(s)	Length
1.	"I Cain't Say No" (Act 1—Scene 1)	Celeste Holm with Oklahoma orchestra

Side 6
No.	Title	Artist(s)	Length
1.	"Many a New Day" (Act 1—Scene 1)	Joan Roberts with Oklahoma girl chorus and orchestra

Side 7
No.	Title	Artist(s)	Length
1.	"People Will Say We're in Love" (Act 1—Scene 1)	Alfred Drake and Joan Roberts with Oklahoma orchestra

Side 8
No.	Title	Artist(s)	Length
1.	"Pore Jud Is Daid" (Act 1—Scene 2)	Alfred Drake and Howard Da Silva with Oklahoma orchestra

Side 9
No.	Title	Artist(s)	Length
1.	"Out of My Dreams" (Act 1—Scene 3)	Joan Roberts with Oklahoma girl chorus and orchestra

Side 10
No.	Title	Artist(s)	Length
1.	"All 'er Nothin'" (Act 2—Scene 1)	Celeste Holm and Lee Dixon with Oklahoma orchestra

Side 11
No.	Title	Artist(s)	Length
1.	"Oklahoma" (Act 2—Scene 2)	Alfred Drake with Oklahoma chorus & orchestra

Side 12
No.	Title	Artist(s)	Length
1.	"Finale" (1) "Oh, What a Beautiful Mornin'" (2) "People Will Say We're in Love""	Alfred Drake and Joan Roberts with Oklahoma chorus & orchestra
