= Oklahoma! (soundtrack) =

Soundtrack album by cast
- Released: August 1, 1955
- Recorded: May 11, 1955
- Genre: Soundtrack
- Label: Angel
- Producers: Andy McKaie, Ron OBrien

Professional ratings
Review scores
Source	Rating
Allmusic	4.5/5 stars

Oklahoma! is the original soundtrack album of the 1955 film Oklahoma!, an adaptation of the musical Broadway play of the same name. The soundtrack charted No. 1 on the Billboard Pop Album Chart in 1956 and has been in continual print. On July 8, 1958, it became the first album to be certified "gold" by the RIAA, and was later certified "2x multi-platinum" on April 1, 1992.

It was originally released as a 42-minute album on the Capitol Records label, but only in mono at first. However, as with the 1956 film soundtracks of Carousel and The King and I (also issued by Capitol on LP), because the film's soundtrack had been recorded in then state-of-the-art stereo, it was possible for Capitol to issue a stereo version of the album in 1959. And again as with Carousel because of a difference between mono and stereo grooves, it was necessary to cut a very brief section of the music on the stereo release.

The album is ranked number 985 in All-Time Top 1000 Albums (3rd. edition, 2000).

In 1956, less than a year after the first mono Capitol soundtrack LP was released, Goddard Lieberson of rival Columbia Records produced a studio cast LP of Oklahoma! featuring Nelson Eddy and a supporting cast, with the chorus and orchestra directed by Lehman Engel, and using the original orchestrations. The Columbia LP Nelson Eddy in Oklahoma (CL 828) was promoted as the "complete score" because it included the song "Lonely Room" and a track, "Entrance of Ensemble", which had not previously been released from the score.

== Todd-AO vs. Cinemascope ==
A notable difference between the mono and stereo versions of the Capitol album is that the Cinemascope version of the film was used in the making of the mono version, while the Todd-AO version was used for the stereophonic release. Although the singing is the same in both, different inflections are noticeable in the brief spoken dialogue retained on the album, for instance, in the spoken portion of the song "Pore Jud Is Daid".

== Named performers ==
By order of appearance on soundtrack.

- Gordon MacRae – Curly McLain
- Shirley Jones – Laurey Williams
- Charlotte Greenwood – Aunt Eller Murphy
- Gene Nelson – Will Parker
- Gloria Grahame – Ado Annie Carnes
- Rod Steiger – Jud Fry
- Jay C. Flippen – Ike Skidmore
- James Whitmore – Andrew Carnes

== Track listing for the LP version ==
All songs composed by Oscar Hammerstein II and Richard Rodgers.

1. "Overture" (Instrumental) – 4:52
2. "Oh, What a Beautiful Mornin'" one verse 'all the cattle are standing like statues' etc. is heard on the soundtrack album but is cut in the final print of the film. (performed by Gordon MacRae) – 2:36
3. "The Surrey with the Fringe on Top" (performed by MacRae, Shirley Jones, Charlotte Greenwood) – 4:53
4. "Kansas City" (performed by Gene Nelson, Greenwood, The Men's Chorus) – 2:36
5. "I Cain't Say No" (performed by Gloria Grahame) – 3:10
6. "Many a New Day" (performed by Jones and Girls' Chorus) – 3:09
7. "People Will Say We're in Love" (performed by MacRae and Jones) – 4:21
8. "Pore Jud is Daid" (performed by MacRae and Rod Steiger) – 4:16
9. "Out of My Dreams" (performed by Jones) – 2:25
10. "The Farmer and the Cowman" (performed by MacRae, Greenwood, Nelson, Jay C. Flippen, James Whitmore, Grahame, Mixed Chorus) – 2:58
11. "All Er Nuthin'" (Grahame, Nelson) – 2:59
12. "Oklahoma" (MacRae, Greenwood, Whitmore, Jones, Flippen, Mixed Chorus) – 3:18

== CD Reissue ==
The film soundtrack album of Oklahoma! was later issued on CD, again by Capitol in a version identical to the stereo LP, then on Broadway Angel on CD in the Broadway Classics series, and finally on Angel in a much expanded CD edition containing virtually all the music. It is the best-known recording of Oklahoma! ever made, even eclipsing the fame of the pioneering 1943 original Broadway cast album of the show.

The latest CD expanded edition contained more than twice the amount of music listed here, and runs nearly 80 minutes, with only a very brief reprise of "I Cain't Say No" and the numbers actually left out of the film omitted. Even the ballet music was included.

One notable difference between the original version of the film soundtrack album and the expanded edition is that the original album contains a new overture specifically created for the recording, and not the overture and opening credits music as heard in the actual film. The expanded edition of the soundtrack, issued in 2001, contains both the overture that was heard before the opening credits in the original roadshow theatrical release of the film, plus the opening credits music exactly as heard in the Todd-AO release of the film.

== Chart positions ==
Chart	Year	Peak position
UK Albums Chart	1956	1
UK Albums Chart	1957	1

== Certifications ==
Region	Certification	Certified units/sales
United States (RIAA)	2× Platinum	2,000,000^{^}
^{^} Shipments figures based on certification alone.
