= Lonely Room =

Song
- Published: 1943
- Songwriter(s): Oscar Hammerstein II
- Composer(s): Richard Rodgers

"Lonely Room" is a tune from Rodgers and Hammerstein's 1943 musical Oklahoma!, sung not too long after "Pore Jud Is Daid.”

"Lonely Room" is Jud Fry's declaration that he will get out of his smokehouse and get Laurey Williams to be his own. He states how tired he is of the dirtiness of his smokehouse and how he longs for a girl of his own. Rodgers’ ability to describe character through music is highlighted by the chromatic sound and the adventurous dissonant intervals.

Sung by Howard Da Silva in the original Broadway production, the song was omitted from the 1955 film adaptation, though an instrumental version is heard briefly during the dream ballet. It was restored for the 1980 and 1998 Broadway and London revivals.

== In popular media ==
Lonely Room is performed by Jesse Plemons during the closing scene of the 2020 film I'm Thinking of Ending Things.
