= Dream ballet =

All-dance, no-singing production number in musical theater

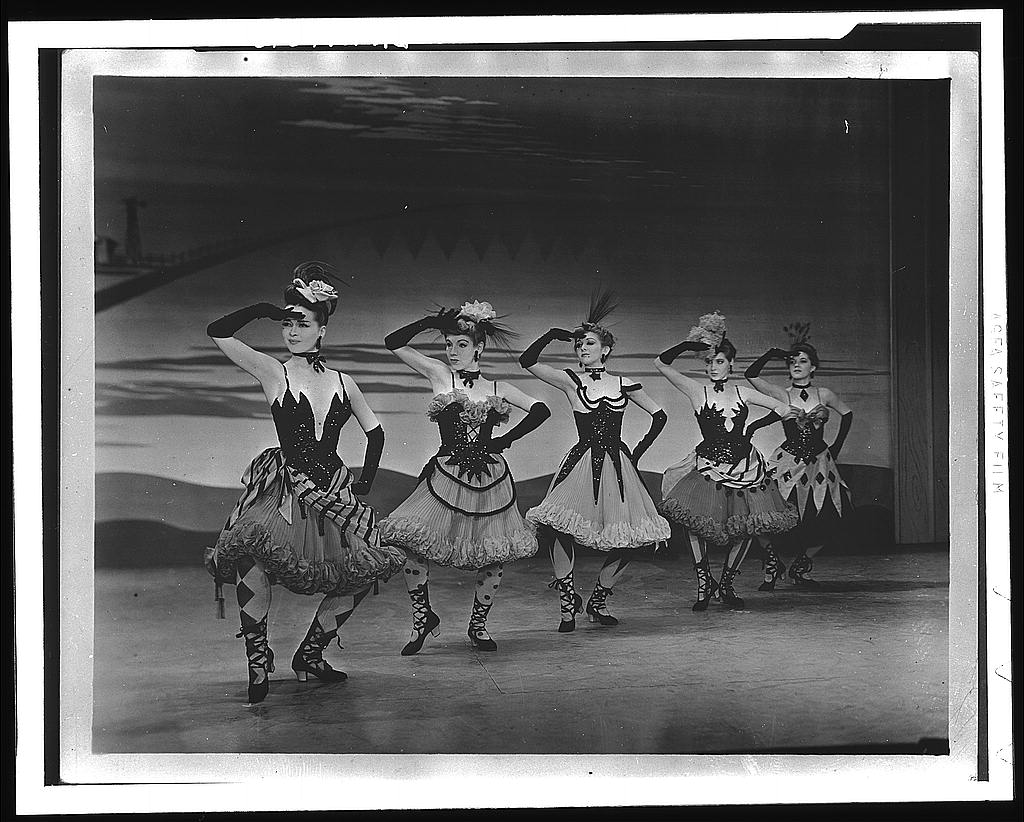
Scene from Oklahoma's dream ballet. Theatre Guild, NYC. 1943. Choreographed by Agnes de Mille.

A dream ballet, in musical theater, is an all-dance, no-singing production number that reflects the themes of the production. The plot, themes, and characters are typically the same—although the people playing the characters may be different, as the roles of the dream ballet are usually filled by well-trained dancers rather than actual actors.

Dream ballet sequences exist mainly for clarification, foreshadowing, and symbolism, and occur outside the continuity of the production. They also advance the plot of the story through dance. Dream ballets also provide the opportunity to impress the audience with advanced dancing techniques and elaborate staging that would otherwise be impossible or dramatically inappropriate.

The dream ballet is thought to have originated in Rodgers and Hammerstein's 1943 musical Oklahoma!, which includes an 18-minute first-act dream ballet finale choreographed by Agnes de Mille, but dream ballets were devices of music-theatrical productions well before 1943. The technique has since become a routine (although by no means universal) theatrical practice.

== Elements of a dream ballet ==
A dream ballet is a moment in a musical, where the dialogue stops and the plot may (though does not always) continue through movement. In Oklahoma!, the first time we see Laurey and Curly have a romantic moment is in the dream ballet. Likewise, what happens in the dream ballet, affects Laurey after she reawakens. This plot device makes the dream ballet unique in the world of musical theater. Dream ballets are not to be confused with dance breaks, though they share some properties. A dream ballet is a dedicated instrumental dance number, whereas dance breaks usually occur in the middle of songs. For example, the dance break in the middle of "Too Darn Hot" from Kiss Me, Kate! would not be considered a dream ballet because it is in the middle of a song with words. Also, it is there with the express purpose of dancing, not to move the plot forward (though some do). Dream ballets, do however, provide opportunities for choreographers to write flashy and extravagant dance numbers that would otherwise be difficult because of how hard it is for actors to sing and dance simultaneously.

It is difficult to say how or why dream ballets, as agents of plot development or as devices of theatrical artifice, became so widespread in the twentieth century, but its appeal had a lot to do with opportunities it provided writers to forgo the laws of reality and creative imaginative and dream-like plot arcs that would otherwise be unrealistic or impossible. They sometimes create a time warp, where large periods of time are expressed or summarized in a montage-like sequence (Rodgers and Hammerstein's Carousel is one such example.). They also provide insight into a character's emotional or psychological state (such as "Laurey Makes Up Her Mind" in Oklahoma!).

== Musicals featuring dream ballets ==
Musicals featuring Dream ballets
Title of Musical	Title of dream ballet	Original Choreographer	Year
Oklahoma!	"Laurey Makes Up Her Mind"	Agnes de Mille	1943
One Touch of Venus	"Venus in Ozone Heights," "Bacchanal"	Agnes de Mille	1943
On The Town	"Presentation of Miss Turnstiles," "Imaginary Coney Island," "Times Square Ballet," "Lonely Town Ballet"	Jerome Robbins	1944
Carousel	"Billy Goes on a Journey"	Agnes de Mille	1945
Brigadoon	"Ballet"	Agnes de Mille	1947
Guys and Dolls	"Crapshooters Ballet"	Michael Kidd	1950
Wonderful Town	"Ballet at the Village Vortex"	Donald Saddler	1953
The Pajama Game	"I'll Never Be Jealous Again Ballet"	Bob Fosse	1954
West Side Story	"Somewhere Ballet"	Jerome Robbins	1957
Bye Bye Birdie	"How to Kill a Man"	Gower Champion	1960
Fiddler on the Roof	"Chaveleh"	Jerome Robbins	1964
The Wiz	"Tornado"	George Faison	1974
Cats	"The Jellicle Ball"	Gillian Lynne	1981
Song and Dance	"Variations"	Anthony van Laast	1982
The Wild Party	"Jackie's Last Dance"	Mark Dendy	2000
An American in Paris	"An American in Paris"	Christopher Wheeldon	2015
Tuck Everlasting	"The Story of Winnie Foster"	Casey Nicholaw	2016

== Dream ballets in film ==
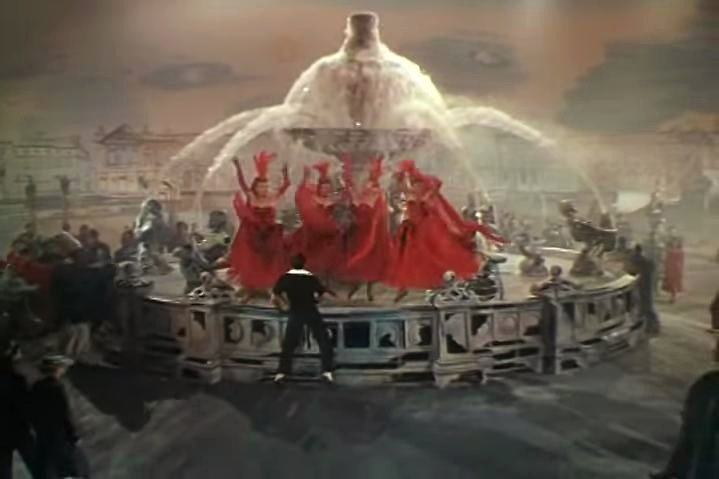
A moment from An American in Paris' dream ballet.

After Oklahoma! debuted onstage, some movie musicals began to incorporate dream ballets into their creations. One notable example is An American in Paris (1951). Directed by Vincente Minnelli and choreographed by both Minnelli and Gene Kelly to George Gershwin's composition, the last twenty minutes of the movie is a dream ballet where Kelly's character Jerry Mulligan examines his relationship with Lise Bouvier, played by Leslie Caron. The dream ballet is supposed to stylistically move from painter to painter as Jerry thinks about his relationship in terms of different painters from Paris.

Another Vincente Minnelli film to feature a dream ballet is The Band Wagon (1953) starring classic film dancers Fred Astaire and Cyd Charisse. Based on the musical of the same name, the dream ballet number "Dancing in the Dark" featured choreography by Michael Kidd. In 1954, Stanley Donen directed Seven Brides for Seven Brothers which featured a "Barn Dance" where the seven sisters are fought over by the seven brothers and their rivals. As he was popular at this time, the choreography was by Michael Kidd.

Oklahoma! debuted as a film in 1955, keeping Agnes DeMille's choreography for the dream ballet intact. Many additional musicals made the transformation from stage to the big screen including Brigadoon (1954), Guys and Dolls (1955), Carousel (1956), West Side Story (1961), and The Wiz (1978). These film versions tended to have big names as stars such as Gene Kelly, Marlon Brando, Frank Sinatra, Rita Moreno, and Diana Ross.

Since then other films have used the concept of a dream ballet including the Coen Brothers' The Hudsucker Proxy (1994) which has an unexpected dream ballet number choreographed by Wesley Fata and performed by Tim Robbins and Pamela Everett, The Big Lebowski (1998) featuring Jeff Bridges, and I'm Thinking of Ending Things (2020). An episode of television series Crazy Ex-Girlfriend (2015) also features a dream ballet entitled "Triceratops Ballet." In an episode of the musical television show Schmigadoon!, when a character senses a dream ballet is about to begin, she immediately halts it, as she believes "nobody likes them and they slow everything down." Pearl is a rare example of a horror film with a dream ballet sequence. In Barbie, "I'm Just Ken" is regarded as "part battle sequence and part dream ballet."

== Notable choreographers of dream ballets ==
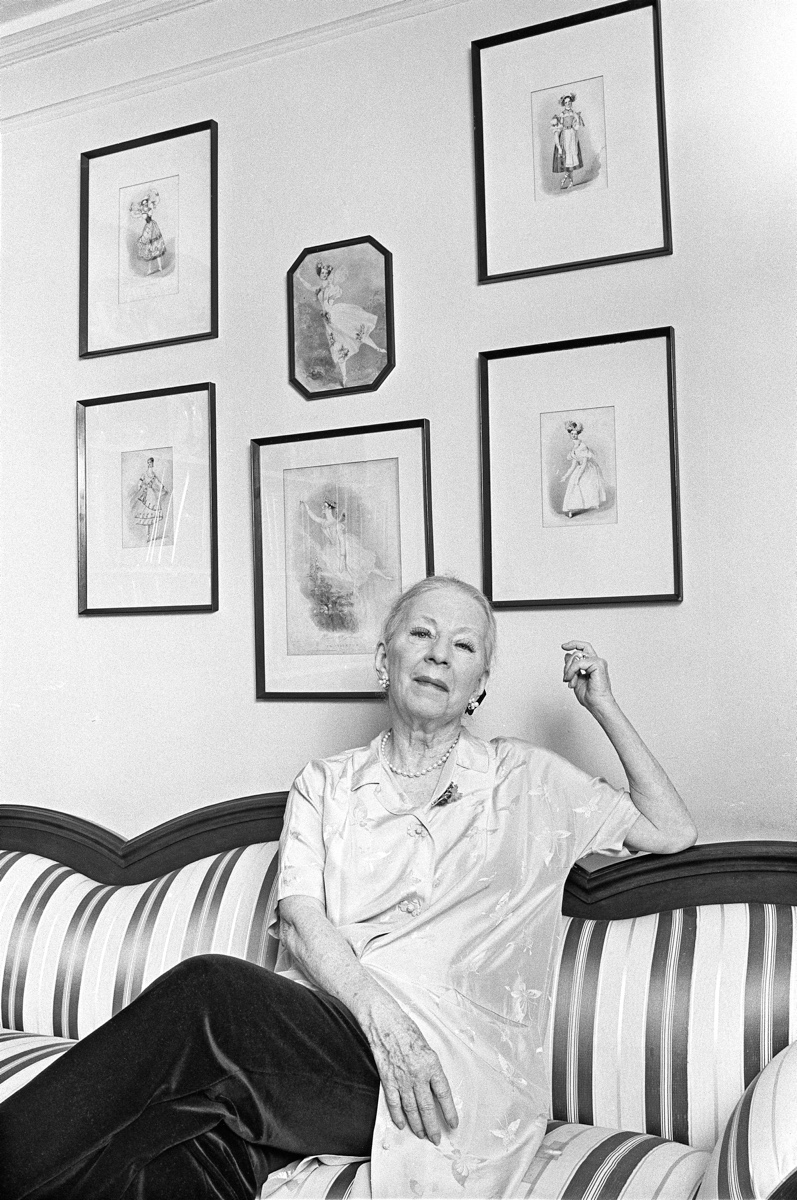
Agnes de Mille in her apartment, as photographed by Lynn Gilbert, 1978, New York City.

=== Agnes de Mille ===
Agnes de Mille had roots in the theater community with her father, William de Mille a Broadway playwright and a Hollywood screenwriter. Her uncle was Cecil B. DeMille, famous for his success as a Hollywood film director. Her family pressured her to pursue a playwriting career for herself, but she wanted to become a ballet dancer. This didn't pan out as she would have liked, in spite of great efforts. She ended up attending UCLA for English and graduated with honors. However, she returned to the stage after moving to New York. She used solo dance recitals as a way to perform, refine her choreographic style, and garnered the interest of fellow theater makers. Agnes de Mille continued on this venture in London for an additional 5 years. In 1940 she helped found American Ballet Theatre back in the United States and choreographed some of their early work. Her big breakthrough, however, came when she choreographed and danced the lead role for "Rodeo" for Ballet Russe de Monte Carlo in 1942. She soon became an in-demand Broadway choreographer after that, working on musicals for stage and film for the next thirty years.

=== Michael Kidd ===
Michael Kidd grew up in New York City in the early 1900s. He started dancing in high school and while he started to pursue a college career in chemical engineering, he soon decided to become a ballet dancer instead. He joined American Ballet Theatre in 1937 and choreographed his first piece, On Stage!, in 1945. After getting a taste for choreography, he soon moved to Broadway and after gaining accolades in the form of Tonys for his choreography in Finian's Rainbow and Guys and Dolls, he became a popular Hollywood choreographer as well. Eventually Kidd added "Broadway director" to his list of accomplishments. His achievements include five Tonys for choreography and an Honorary Academy Award, which he received in 1997.
