= Rodgers and Hammerstein =

20th-century American songwriting team

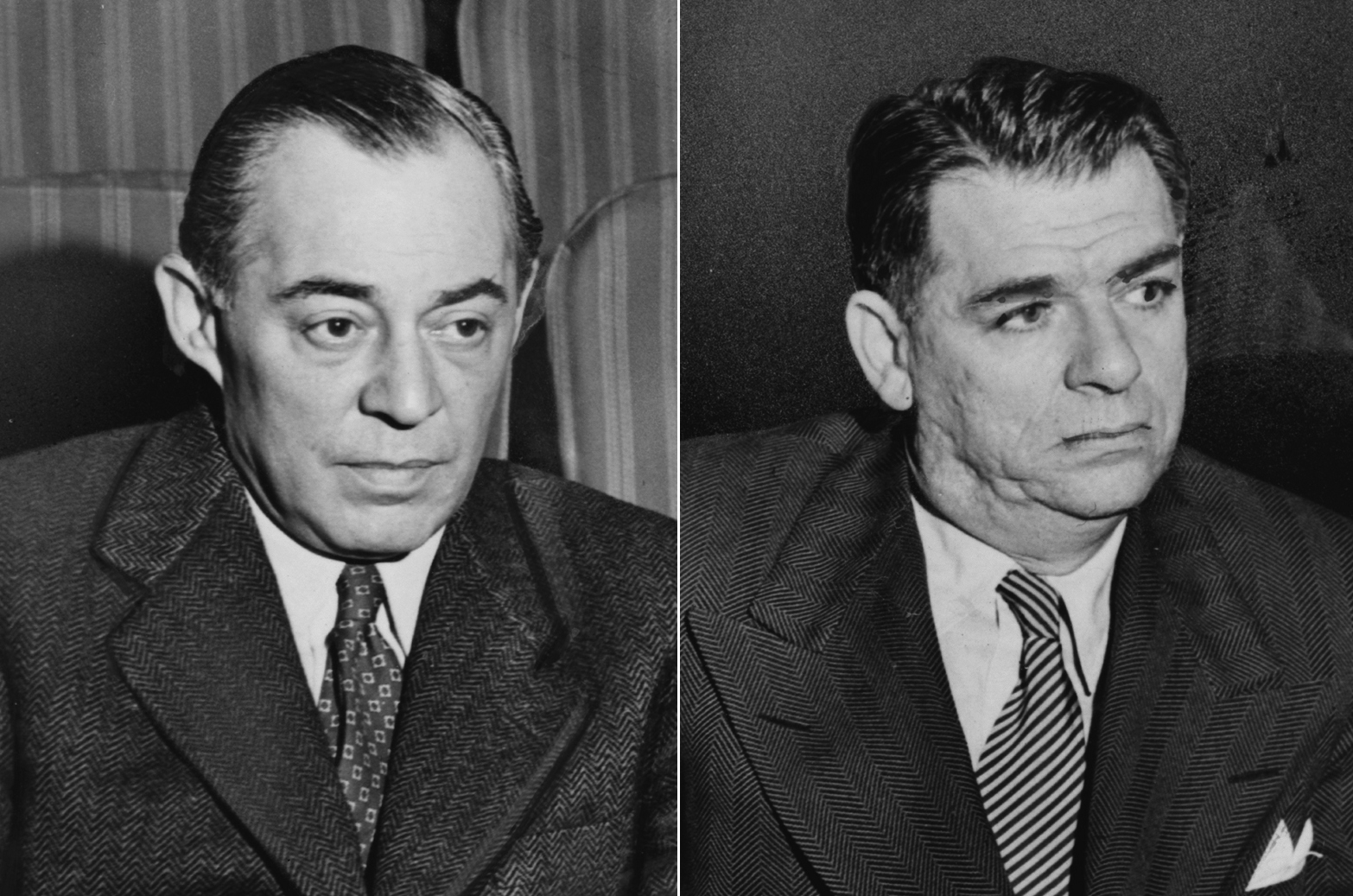
Rodgers (left) and Hammerstein (right) watching auditions at the St. James Theatre on Broadway in 1948

Rodgers and Hammerstein was an American theater-writing team of composer Richard Rodgers (1902–1979) and lyricist-dramatist Oscar Hammerstein II (1895–1960), who together created a series of innovative and influential American musicals. Their musical theater writing partnership has been called the greatest of the 20th century.

Their popular Broadway productions in the 1940s and 1950s initiated what is considered the "golden age" of musical theater. Five of their Broadway shows, Oklahoma!, Carousel, South Pacific, The King and I and The Sound of Music, were outstanding successes, as was the television broadcast of Cinderella (1957). Of the other four shows the pair produced on Broadway during their lifetimes, Flower Drum Song was well-received, and none was a critical or commercial flop. Most of their shows have received frequent revivals around the world, both professional and amateur. Among the many accolades their shows (and film versions of them) garnered were 34 Tony Awards, fifteen Academy Awards, two Pulitzer Prizes (for Oklahoma!, 1944, and South Pacific, 1950) and two Grammy Awards.

== Previous work and partnerships ==
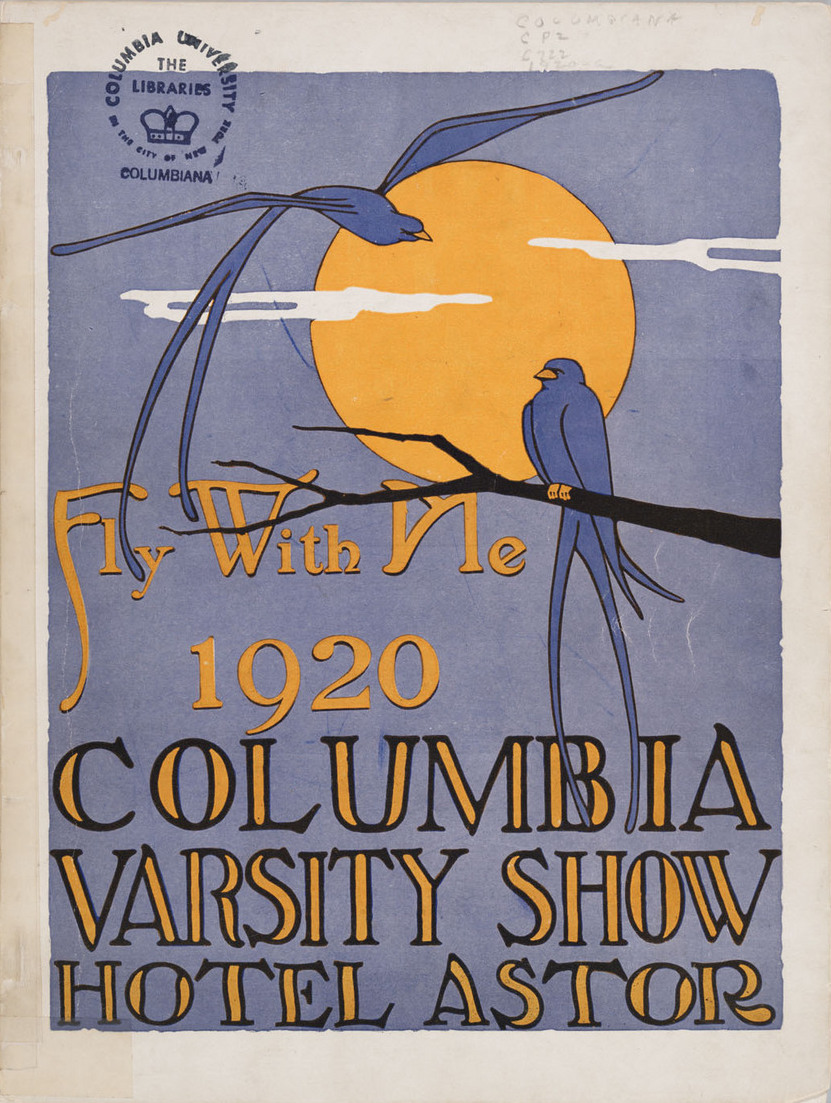
Program for Fly With Me, 1920

At Columbia University, Rodgers and Hammerstein collaborated on the 1920 Varsity Show, Fly With Me. The songs for the show were originally written by Rodgers (a freshman) and Lorenz Hart. Hammerstein, who was on the judging committee, added two songs in the revising stage. The three men collaborated again on the 1921 Varsity Show, You'll Never Know, with Hammerstein as "Director of Production". Although Rodgers did not work with Hammerstein again until Oklahoma!, they achieved success independently from each other. Rodgers continued to collaborate for more than two decades with Hart. Among their many Broadway hits were the shows A Connecticut Yankee (1927), Babes in Arms (1937), The Boys from Syracuse (1938), Pal Joey (1940), and By Jupiter (1942), as well as many successful film projects.

Hammerstein, a co-writer of the popular Rudolf Friml 1924 operetta Rose-Marie, and Sigmund Romberg operettas The Desert Song (1926) and The New Moon (1928), began a successful collaboration with composer Jerome Kern on Sunny (1925), which was a hit. Their 1927 musical Show Boat is considered to be one of the masterpieces of the American musical theater. Other Hammerstein/Kern collaborations include Sweet Adeline (1929) and Very Warm for May (1939). Although the last of these was panned by critics, it contains one of Kern and Hammerstein's best-loved songs, "All the Things You Are".

By the early 1940s, Hart had sunk deeper into alcoholism and emotional turmoil, and he became unreliable, prompting Rodgers to approach Hammerstein to ask if he would consider working with him.

== Early work ==
=== Oklahoma! ===
Independent of each other, Rodgers and Hammerstein had been attracted to making a musical based on Lynn Riggs' stage play Green Grow the Lilacs. When Jerome Kern declined Hammerstein's offer to work on such a project and Hart refused Rodgers' offer to do the same, Rodgers and Hammerstein began their first collaboration. The result, Oklahoma! (1943), marked a revolution in musical drama. Although not the first musical to tell a story of emotional depth and psychological complexity, Oklahoma! introduced a number of new storytelling elements and techniques. These included its use of song and dance to convey and advance both plot and character, rather than act as a diversion from the story, and the firm integration of every song into the plot-line.

Oklahoma! was originally called Away We Go! and opened at the Shubert Theatre in New Haven on March 11, 1943. Only a few changes were made before it opened on Broadway, but three would prove significant: the addition of a show-stopping number, "Oklahoma!"; the deletion of the musical number "Boys and Girls Like You and Me", which was soon replaced with a reprise of "People Will Say We're in Love"; and the decision to re-title the musical after the song.

The original Broadway production opened on March 31, 1943, at the St. James Theatre. Although the typical musical of the time was usually written around the talents of a specific performer, such as Ethel Merman or Fred Astaire, no stars were used in the production. Ultimately the original cast included Alfred Drake (Curly), Joan Roberts (Laurey), Celeste Holm (Ado Annie), Howard Da Silva (Jud Fry), Betty Garde (Aunt Eller), Lee Dixon (Will Parker) and Joseph Bulloff (Ali Hakim). Marc Platt danced the role of "Dream Curly", and Katharine Sergava danced the part of "Dream Laurey". In Oklahoma!, the story and the songs were considered more important than sheer star power. Nevertheless, the production ran for a then-unprecedented 2,212 performances, finally closing on May 29, 1948. Many enduring musical standards come from this show, among them "Oh, What a Beautiful Mornin'", "The Surrey with the Fringe on Top", "I Cain't Say No", the aforementioned "People Will Say We're in Love", and "Oklahoma!". The popularity of these songs prompted Decca Records to have the original cast record the music from the show with the original orchestrations. This became the first musical to have an original cast recording, which is now a standard practice.

In 1955, it was made into an Academy Award-winning musical film, the first feature shot with the Todd-AO 70 mm widescreen process. The film starred Gordon MacRae and Shirley Jones, and its soundtrack was No. 1 on the 1956 album charts.

After their initial success with Oklahoma!, the pair took a break from working together and Hammerstein concentrated on the musical Carmen Jones, a stage version of Bizet's Carmen with the characters changed to African Americans in the contemporary South, for which he wrote the book and lyrics. The musical was adapted to the screen in 1954, and scored a Best Actress Oscar nomination for leading lady Dorothy Dandridge. Rodgers and Hammerstein also received a special Pulitzer Prize in 1944 for Oklahoma!.

=== Carousel ===
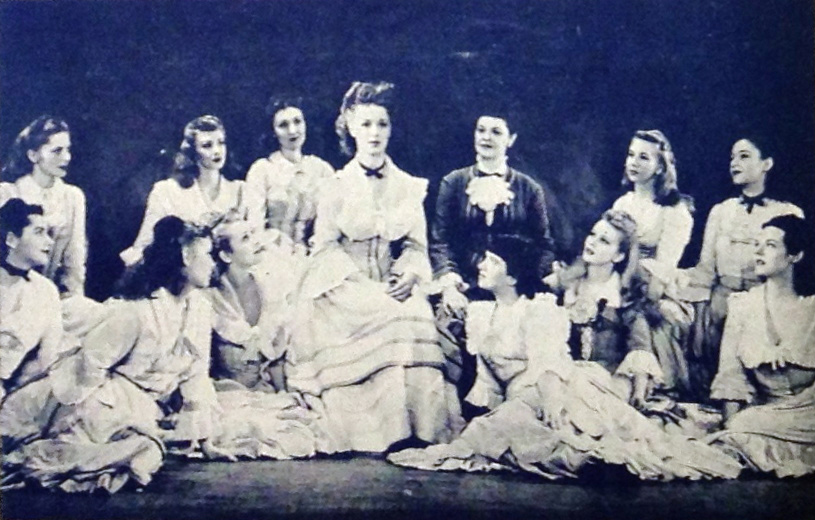
"What's the Use of Wond'rin' " from Carousel (1947)

The original production of Carousel was directed by Rouben Mamoulian and opened at Broadway's Majestic Theatre on April 19, 1945, running for 890 performances and closing on May 24, 1947. The cast included John Raitt, Jan Clayton, Jean Darling, Christine Johnson and Bambi Linn. From this show came the hit musical numbers "The Carousel Waltz" (an instrumental), "If I Loved You", "June Is Bustin' Out All Over", and "You'll Never Walk Alone".

Carousel was also revolutionary for its time – adapted from Ferenc Molnár's play Liliom, it was one of the first musicals to contain a tragic plot about an antihero; it also contained an extended ballet that was crucial to the plot, and several extended musical scenes containing both sung and spoken material, as well as dance. The 1956 film version of Carousel, made in CinemaScope 55, again starred Gordon MacRae and Shirley Jones, the same leads as the film version of Oklahoma!

Carousel is also unique among the Rodgers and Hammerstein musicals for not having an overture; both the stage and film versions began with the familiar Carousel Waltz. This music was included in John Mauceri's Philips Records CD of the complete overtures of Rodgers and Hammerstein with the Hollywood Bowl Orchestra. It was also included in Rodgers' rare 1954 album for Columbia Records with the composer conducting the New York Philharmonic Orchestra.

=== State Fair ===
In 1945, a Technicolor musical film version of Phil Stong's novel State Fair, with songs and script by Rodgers and Hammerstein, was released. The film, a remake of a 1933 non-musical Will Rogers film of the same name, starred Jeanne Crain, Dana Andrews, Dick Haymes, and Vivian Blaine. This was the only time the pair ever wrote a score directly for film. It was a great success, winning Rodgers and Hammerstein their lone Oscar together, for the song "It Might as Well Be Spring", but it was also unadventurous material for them, compared with several of their Broadway shows. In 1962, an unsuccessful remake of the musical film was released.

In 1969, the St. Louis Municipal Opera presented the world stage premiere of State Fair starring Ozzie and Harriet Nelson. The production was directed by James Hammerstein, supervised by Richard Rodgers and choreographed by Tommy Tune. State Fair finally arrived on Broadway on March 27, 1996, with Donna McKechnie and Andrea McArdle, produced by David Merrick, and received five Tony Award nominations.

== South Pacific and important subsequent works ==
=== South Pacific ===
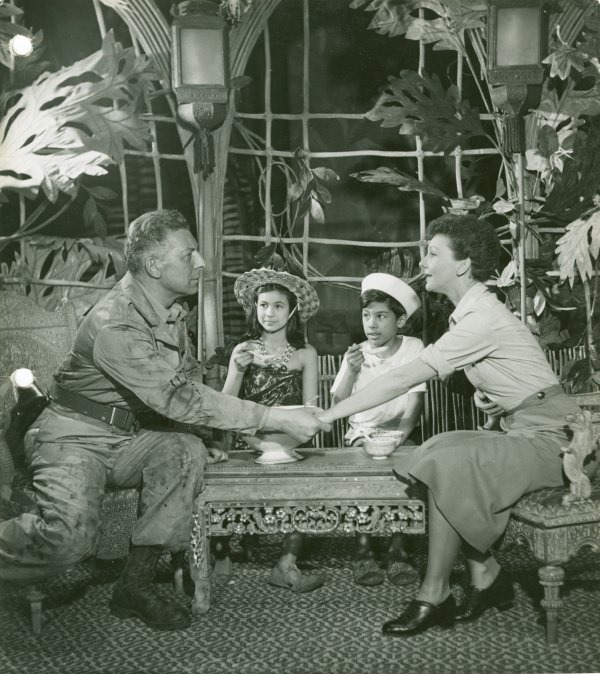
The final tableau in South Pacific (1949)

South Pacific opened on Broadway on April 7, 1949, and ran for over five years. Its songs "Bali Ha'i", "Younger Than Springtime", and "Some Enchanted Evening" have become standards. The play is based upon two short stories by James A. Michener from his book Tales of the South Pacific, which itself was the winner of the Pulitzer Prize for Fiction in 1948. For their adaptation, Rodgers and Hammerstein, along with co-writer Joshua Logan, won the Pulitzer Prize for Drama in 1950. The song "You've Got to Be Carefully Taught" was controversial due to its support of interracial marriage. Rodgers and Hammerstein refused to remove it from the show, even if it meant the show failing. When the show was touring in Atlanta, Georgia, it offended some Georgian lawmakers, who proposed a bill to outlaw any entertainment they deemed to be inspired by Moscow.

In the original production, Mary Martin starred as the heroine Nellie Forbush, and opera star Ezio Pinza starred as Emile de Becque, the French plantation owner. Also in the cast were Juanita Hall, Myron McCormick and Betta St. John. The 1958 film version, also directed by Logan, starred Mitzi Gaynor, Rossano Brazzi, John Kerr, Ray Walston, and Juanita Hall. Brazzi, Kerr, and Hall had their singing dubbed by others.

=== The King and I ===
Based on Margaret Landon's Anna and the King of Siam—the story of Anna Leonowens, governess to the children of King Mongkut of Siam in the early 1860s—Rodgers and Hammerstein's musical The King and I opened at the St. James Theatre on Broadway on March 29, 1951, starring Gertrude Lawrence as Anna and the mostly unknown Yul Brynner as the king. This musical featured the hit songs "I Whistle a Happy Tune", "Hello, Young Lovers", "Getting to Know You", "We Kiss in a Shadow", "Something Wonderful", "I Have Dreamed", and "Shall We Dance?"

The King and I was followed by Me and Juliet, which opened at the Majestic Theatre on May 28, 1953. When Oklahoma! returned to Broadway on August 31, 1953, with The King and I, Me and Juliet and South Pacific all still playing, Rodgers and Hammerstein had four shows appearing on Broadway at once.

The King and I was adapted for film in 1956 with Brynner re-creating his role opposite Deborah Kerr (whose singing was largely dubbed by Marni Nixon). Brynner won an Oscar as Best Actor for his portrayal, and Kerr was nominated as Best Actress. Brynner reprised the role twice on Broadway in 1977 and 1985 and in a short-lived TV sitcom in 1972, Anna and the King.

=== Cinderella ===
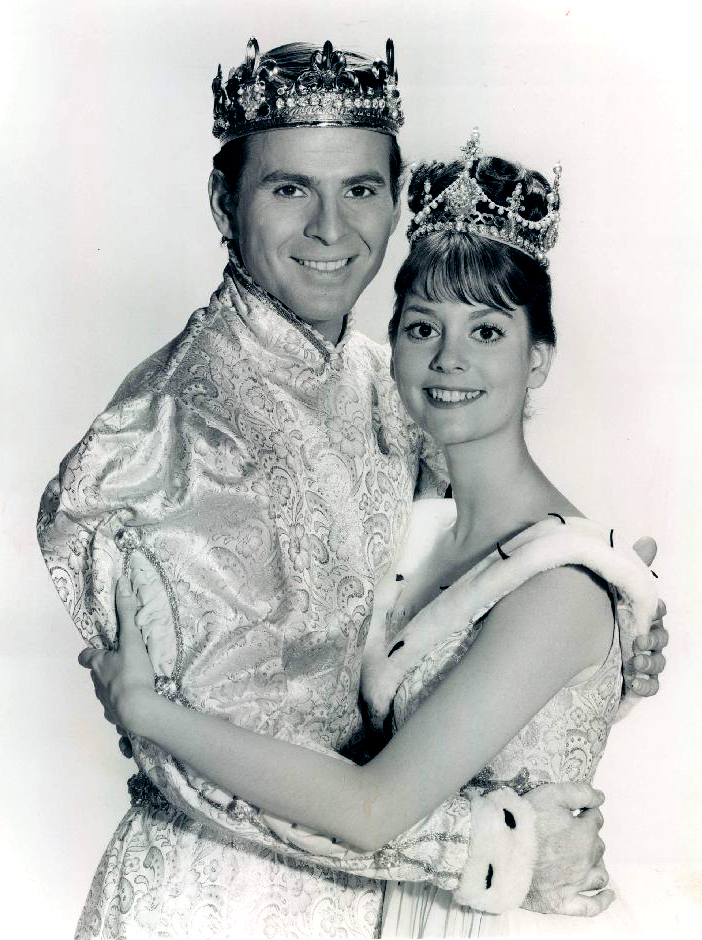
Stuart Damon, as the Prince, and Lesley Ann Warren, as Cinderella.

Based on the fairytale character and story of Cinderella, Rodgers and Hammerstein created their only collaborative effort written for television. Cinderella aired on March 31, 1957, on CBS. More than 107 million viewers saw the broadcast, and Julie Andrews was nominated for an Emmy Award for her performance in the title role. Rodgers and Hammerstein originally signed to work with NBC, but CBS approached them, offering the chance to work with Julie Andrews, and the two quickly agreed. Rodgers stated, "What won us over was the chance to work with Julie". Andrews played Cinderella, with Edith Adams as the Fairy Godmother, Kaye Ballard and Alice Ghostley as stepsisters Joy and Portia, and Jon Cypher as Prince Christopher. Though it was broadcast in color, and the major networks all had the new (B&W) videotape recorders from Ampex, a black and white kinescope is all that remains. It featured songs still treasured today, "In My Own Little Corner", "Ten Minutes Ago" and "Impossible: It's Possible". After the success of the 1957 production, another version was presented in 1965 and shown annually on CBS, starring Lesley Ann Warren, Stuart Damon, Celeste Holm and Walter Pidgeon. Yet another television version first aired in 1997 on ABC, produced by Walt Disney Television, starring Brandy, Whitney Houston, Bernadette Peters, and Whoopi Goldberg. Stage versions were also presented in London and elsewhere, and the musical was finally given a Broadway production, with a revised book by Douglas Carter Beane, and incorporating four songs from the Rodgers and Hammerstein catalog, in 2013.

=== Flower Drum Song ===
Based on a 1957 novel by C. Y. Lee, Flower Drum Song takes place in San Francisco's Chinatown in the late 1950s. The original 1958 production was directed by dancer/singer/actor Gene Kelly. The story deals with a young Chinese woman who illegally comes to America in hopes of marrying a wealthy young Chinese-American man, who is already in love with a Chinatown nightclub dancer. The young man's parents are traditional Chinese and want him to marry the new Chinese immigrant, but he is hesitant until he falls in love with her. Though this musical did not achieve the popularity of the team's five most famous musicals, it was nevertheless a success and broke new ground by using a mostly Asian cast. The 1961 film adaptation was a lavish, but much criticized, Ross Hunter production released by Universal Studios. A Broadway revival in 2002 starring Lea Salonga had a rewritten plot by playwright David Henry Hwang but retained the inter-generational and immigrant themes as well as most of the original songs.

=== The Sound of Music ===
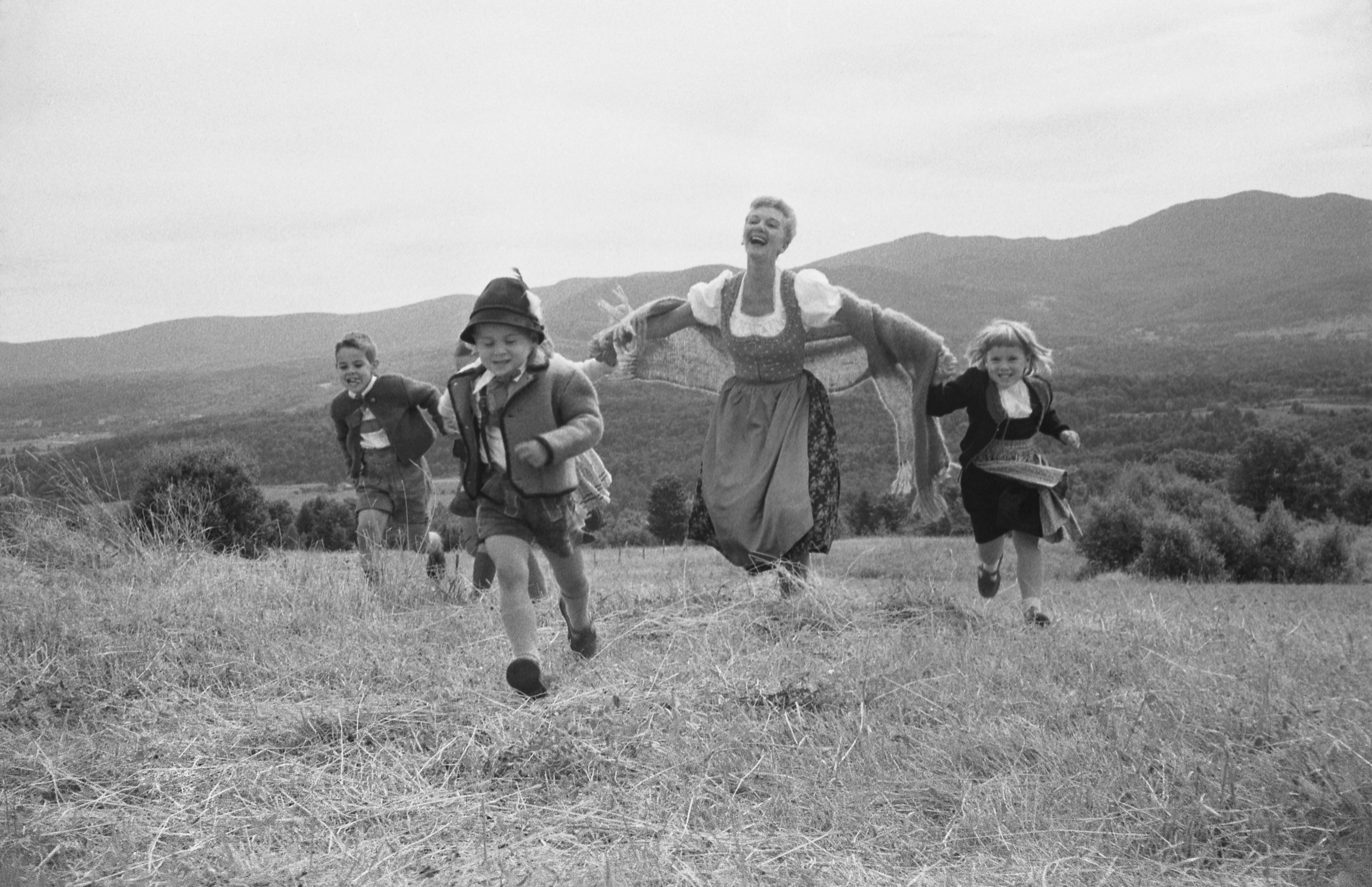
Mary Martin and children in a publicity photo (1959)

The Sound of Music, Rodgers and Hammerstein's last work together, is based on the story of the Austrian Von Trapp Family. Starring Mary Martin as Maria and Theodore Bikel as Captain von Trapp, it opened on Broadway at the Lunt-Fontanne Theatre on November 16, 1959, garnering much praise and numerous awards. It has been frequently revived ever since. The show was made into a film in 1965 starring Julie Andrews as Maria and Christopher Plummer as the Captain. It won five Oscars, including Best Picture and Best Director, Robert Wise. Hammerstein died in August 1960, before the film was made, so when Rodgers was asked to create two new songs for the film ("I Have Confidence" and "Something Good"), he wrote the lyrics as well as the music. The Sound of Music contains more hit songs than any other Rodgers and Hammerstein musical, and the film version was the most financially successful film adaptation of a Broadway musical ever made. The most enduring of these include the title song, "Do-Re-Mi", "My Favorite Things", "Climb Ev'ry Mountain", "So Long, Farewell" and "Sixteen Going on Seventeen". "Edelweiss" was the last song that Rodgers and Hammerstein wrote together.

== Legacy ==
Rodgers and Hammerstein re-worked the musical theater genre. Early 20th-century musicals, except for the Princess Theatre musicals and a few important examples like Hammerstein and Jerome Kern's Show Boat, were usually whimsical or farcical, and typically built around a star. Because the efforts of Rodgers and Hammerstein were so successful, many musicals that followed contained thought-provoking plots with mature themes, and in which all the aspects of the play, dance, song, and drama were combined in an integrated whole. Stephen Sondheim has cited Rodgers and Hammerstein as having had a crucial influence on his work.

Rodgers and Hammerstein also use the technique of what some call the "formula musical". While some hail this approach, others criticize it for its predictability. The term "formula musical" may refer to a musical with a predictable plot, but it also refers to the casting requirements of Rodgers & Hammerstein characters. Typically, any musical from this team will have the casting of a strong baritone lead, a dainty and light soprano lead, a supporting tenor lead, and a supporting alto lead. Although there are exceptions to this generalization, it simplifies the audition process and gives audiences an idea of what to expect vocally from a Rodgers and Hammerstein musical. However, this formula had been used in Viennese operetta, such as The Merry Widow.

William A. Everett and Paul R. Laird wrote that Oklahoma!, "like Show Boat, became a milestone, so that later historians writing about important moments in twentieth-century theatre would begin to identify eras according to their relationship to Oklahoma!" In The Complete Book of Light Opera, Mark Lubbock adds, "After Oklahoma!, Rodgers and Hammerstein were the most important contributors to the musical-play form – with such masterworks as Carousel, The King and I and South Pacific. The examples they set in creating vital plays, often rich with social thought, provided the necessary encouragement for other gifted writers to create musical plays of their own."

In 1950, the team of Rodgers and Hammerstein received The Hundred Year Association of New York's Gold Medal Award "in recognition of outstanding contributions to the City of New York". They were also honored in 1999 with a United States Postal Service stamp commemorating their partnership. The Richard Rodgers Theatre in New York City is named after Rodgers. Forbes named Rodgers and Hammerstein second on its list of top-earning dead celebrities in 2009 at $235 million. In 2010, the original film arrangements of the team's music were restored and performed at the Proms concerts in London's Royal Albert Hall by the John Wilson Orchestra.

A revue of Rodgers and Hammerstein's songs, A Grand Night for Singing, played on Broadway in 1993.

== On television and film ==
Rodgers and Hammerstein appeared on live telecasts several times. They were guests on the very first broadcast of Toast of the Town, the original name of The Ed Sullivan Show, when it debuted on CBS in June 1948. In 1954, they appeared on a memorable TV musical special, General Foods 25th Anniversary Show: A Salute to Rodgers and Hammerstein. They were the mystery guests on episode number 298 of What's My Line, which first aired on February 19, 1956; blindfolded panelist Arlene Francis was able to correctly identify them.

The pair made a rare feature film appearance in MGM's 1953 production Main Street to Broadway, in which Rodgers played the piano and Hammerstein sang a song they had written. They also appeared in the trailer for the film version of South Pacific in 1958.

== Social issues ==
While Rodgers and Hammerstein's work contains cheerful and often uplifting songs, they departed from the comic and sentimental tone of early 20th-century musicals by seriously addressing issues such as racism, sexism and classism in many of their works. For example, Carousel concerns domestic violence, while South Pacific addresses racism. Based on the true story of the von Trapp family, The Sound of Music explores the views of Austrians on the Anschluss, the takeover of Austria by Nazi Germany in March 1938.

== Works ==
- 1943 Oklahoma!
  - 1955 film version
- 1945 Carousel
  - 1956 film version
  - 1967 TV version
- 1945 State Fair (film)
  - 1962 remake
  - 1996 Broadway version
- 1947 Allegro
- 1949 South Pacific
  - 1958 film version
  - 2001 TV version
- 1951 The King and I
  - 1956 film version
  - 1999 animation
- 1953 Me and Juliet
- 1955 Pipe Dream
- 1957 Cinderella (television)
  - 1958 West End version (pantomime-style adaptation)
  - 1965 TV remake
  - 1997 TV remake
  - 2013 Broadway version (rewritten book with added songs)
- 1958 Flower Drum Song
  - 1961 film version
  - 2002 revival (rewritten book with one new song)
- 1959 The Sound of Music
  - 1965 film version
  - 2013 live television version
  - 2015 live television version (UK)

== See also ==
- Rodgers and Hart
- Concord Music, owner of the Rodgers and Hammerstein copyrights
- List of songwriter collaborations

== Sources ==
- Everett, William A.; Laird, Paul (2002). The Cambridge Companion to the Musical. Cambridge University Press. ISBN 0-521-79639-3.
- Hischak, Thomas (2007). The Rodgers and Hammerstein Encyclopedia. Greenwood Publishing Group. ISBN 978-0-313-34140-3.
- Hyland, William G. (1998). Richard Rodgers. New Haven, Conn.: Yale University Press. ISBN 978-0-300-07115-3.
