= It's a Scandal! It's a Outrage! =

Song
- Published: 1943
- Songwriter(s): Oscar Hammerstein II
- Composer(s): Richard Rodgers

It's a Scandal! It's a Outrage! is a song from the 1943 musical Oklahoma!. It was first performed on Broadway by Joseph Buloff.

Traveling salesman Ali Hakim has just been pushed into marrying Ado Annie Carnes by her father, Andrew Carnes. Hakim's character is described as Persian, but is based on a Syrian peddler character in Lynn Riggs's 1930 play Green Grow the Lilacs, and was commonly perceived by audiences as an Ashkenazi Jewish character due to the stereotypes he embodies.

In the musical, Hakim is the type of character who would flirt with forty women, but would prefer marriage only over being shot. Feeling trapped, he sings with the men of Oklahoma of how tricky and dirty girls are in getting husbands, using their fathers (with their guns) as backups. The song ends with the men declaring a revolution and then having their plans thwarted by women, who come in and drag them away.

During the song, he compares humans to chickens ("A rooster in a chicken coop is better off'n men, he ain't the special property of just one hen!") and tells of the dangers of being caught flirting ("If you make one mistake when the moon is bright, then they tie you to a contract so you make it every night!").

Hakim only sings two lines of the song; the rest is spoken. The name of the song contains a grammatical error ("a Outrage," instead of "an Outrage") deliberately as Hammerstein wrote his scripts phonetically to indicate dialect.

This song from the original stage musical was not included in the 1955 film version, but is used briefly as underscoring for Ali's appearance.
