= Ridge Bond =

American actor and singer

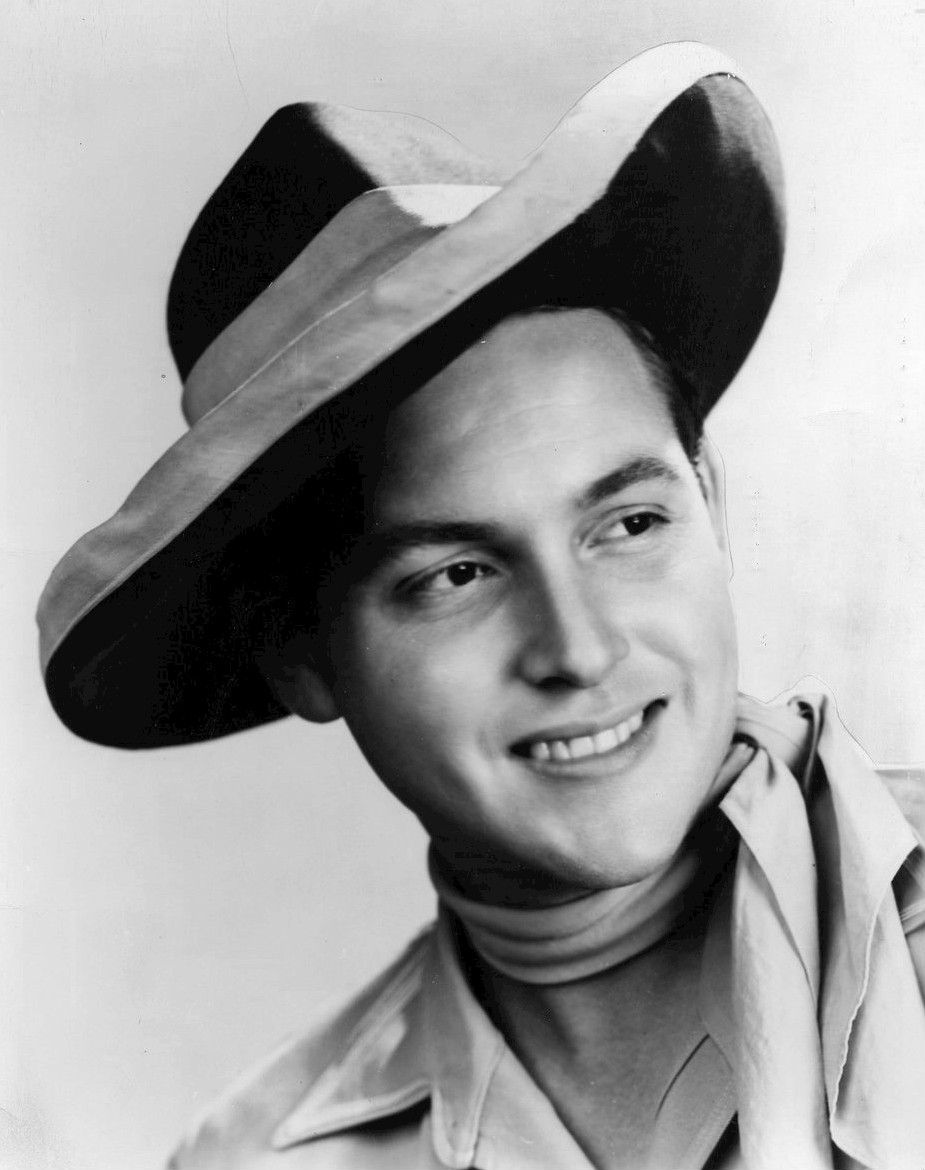
Ridge Bond as Curly in 1949

Ridgely McClure "Ridge" Bond (July 12, 1922 – May 6, 1997) was an American actor, singer and businessman, who is best known for playing the role of Curly in the musical Oklahoma! on Broadway and on tour. He retired from acting when the musical closed in 1954, and entered the insurance business.

== Life and career ==
Bond was born in McAlester, Oklahoma. He attended the University of Tulsa, where he played a leading role in the play Green Grow the Lilacs, which was later adapted as Oklahoma!. He served in the U.S. Navy in World War II. After his discharge, he joined the Broadway cast of Oklahoma! in 1946, soon taking over as Curly for Howard Keel, and, according to Deseret News, he played the role of Curly for the longest period of any actor during the original Broadway production. He then toured with the show and played the role in the 1951 and 1953 Broadway revivals. He reportedly performed this role 2,600 times during his career. He was also the only Oklahoma native to play the role.

In 1953, Bond was instrumental in assisting Oklahoma state representative (and later Governor) George Nigh to promote the show's title song in becoming the Oklahoma state song. After Oklahoma! closed in 1954, Bond retired from acting and joined American Family Life Insurance Co. as a district coordinator in its Tulsa office. He continued in the insurance business.

== Honors ==
In 1991, Bond was the recipient of the Lynn Riggs Award, presented by Rogers State University. (Note: Lynn Riggs, a native of Oklahoma, was the author of "Green Grow the Lilacs.) In 1993, the Oklahoma Heritage Association named Bond an Ambassador of Goodwill.

Bond's likeness, in character as Curly (along with Laurie), was featured on the U.S. postage stamp commemorating the 50th anniversary of Oklahoma! Also in 1993, Bond was inducted into the Oklahoma Hall of Fame.

== Family life ==
Bond married restoration artist Maxine Vincent (1921–2008) on September 25, 1943. They were married for 54 years, and had two children, musician and sound engineer Geoffrey Bond and Pamela Bond-Simmons.

He died in Tulsa, Oklahoma, in 1997, aged 74. He and his wife are buried at Woodlawn Cemetery in Claremore, Oklahoma.
