= Bedside =

1934 film directed by Robert Florey

- Film poster
- Directed by: Robert Florey
- Written by: Lillie Hayward; James Wharton; Rian James (additional dialogue)
- Story by: Mauel Seff; Harvey F. Thew
- Produced by: Samuel Bischoff (uncredited)
- Starring: Warren William; Jean Muir; Allen Jenkins
- Cinematography: Sidney Hickox
- Edited by: Harold McLernon
- Music by: Bernhard Kaun
- Production company: First National Pictures
- Distributed by: First National Pictures; The Vitaphone Corporation
- Release date: January 27, 1934
- Running time: 63-66 minutes
- Country: United States
- Language: English

Bedside is a 1934 American pre-Code drama film starring Warren William, Jean Muir and Allen Jenkins.

== Plot ==
A man passes himself off as a doctor.

== Cast ==
- Warren William as Bob Brown
- Jean Muir as Caroline Grant
- Allen Jenkins as Sam Sparks
- David Landau as Smith
- Katharine Sergava (Kathryn Sergava) as Mimi Maritza
- Henry O'Neill as Dr. William Chester
- Donald Meek as Dr. George Wiley
- Renee Whitney as Mme. Varsova
- Walter Walker as Dr. Michaels
- Marjorie Lytell as Patient with Sprained Ankle
- Frederick Burton as Hospital Superintendent
- Philip Faversham as Intern Attending Caroline (as Phillip Faversham)
- Louise Beavers as Pansy
- Earle Foxe as Joe

== Reception ==
The New York Times critic wrote that "the story of 'Bedside' is not quite as predictable a thing as it sounds, but its deviations from the formula are too wild-eyed to be classed as dramatic virtues."
