= Many a New Day =

Song
- Published: 1943
- Songwriter(s): Oscar Hammerstein II
- Composer(s): Richard Rodgers

"Many a New Day" is a song from the 1943 musical Oklahoma!, written by Richard Rodgers and Oscar Hammerstein II. It was introduced by Joan Roberts in the original Broadway production. In the 1955 film, the song is performed by Shirley Jones and appears on the soundtrack album.

"Many a New Day" is sung by Laurey immediately after Curly McLain leaves the scene with Gertie Cummings. Laurey ostensibly does not care that Curly is with a new girl, though it is obvious she is hurt, especially as shown by the slow restatement of the final lines at the end.

The song, like many of its era and like many others by Rodgers and Hammerstein, follows some variant of the Verse + AABA structure, a traditional song layout from the Tin Pan Alley era. Also true to form, the economically constructed melody spans only a ninth. The sequence-driven B section ("Never have I wept into my tea," etc.) is exemplary of Rodgers' writing, and similar progressions can be found in songs such as "I Cain't Say No”.

In the intro verse, Laurey sings about what she does after a romance, to prove that she is not upset.

"I'll snap my fingers to show I don't care,
I'll buy me a brand-new dress to wear.
I'll scrub my neck and I'll brush my hair,
And start all over again."
