= Oklahoma! (film) =

1955 American musical film directed by Fred Zinnemann

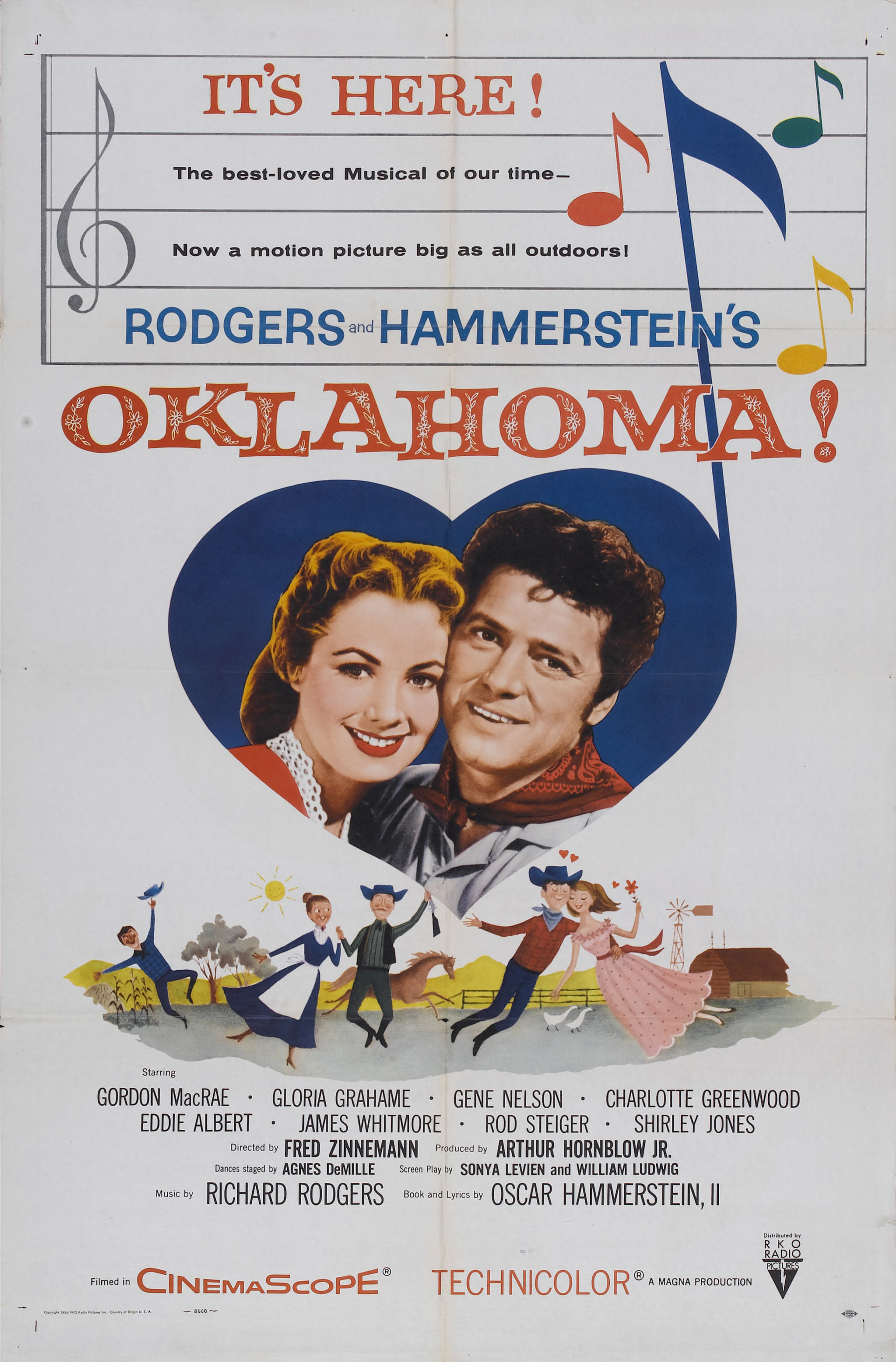
- Theatrical release poster
- Directed by: Fred Zinnemann
- Screenplay by: Sonya Levien; William Ludwig
- Based on: Oklahoma! (1943 musical) by Rodgers and Hammerstein; Green Grow the Lilacs (1930 play) by Lynn Riggs
- Produced by: Arthur Hornblow Jr.
- Starring: Gordon MacRae; Gloria Grahame; Gene Nelson; Charlotte Greenwood; Eddie Albert; James Whitmore; Rod Steiger; Shirley Jones
- Cinematography: Robert Surtees
- Edited by: George Boemler; Gene Ruggiero
- Music by: Richard Rodgers; Adaptation: Robert Russell Bennett; Jay Blackton; Adolph Deutsch
- Distributed by: Magna Theatre Corporation (70mm); RKO Radio Pictures (35mm)
- Release date: October 11, 1955 (Rivoli Theatre)
- Running time: 148 minutes (Todd-AO Roadshow release version); 140 minutes (CinemaScope General release version)
- Country: United States
- Language: English
- Budget: $5.9 million
- Box office: $7.1 million (est. US/ Canada rentals)

Oklahoma! is a 1955 American musical film directed by Fred Zinnemann, based on the 1943 stage musical by Rodgers and Hammerstein, in turn based on the 1931 play Green Grow the Lilacs by Lynn Riggs. It stars Gordon MacRae, Shirley Jones (in her film debut), Rod Steiger, Charlotte Greenwood, Gloria Grahame, Gene Nelson, James Whitmore, and Eddie Albert.

Set in Oklahoma Territory shortly after the turn of the 20th century, it tells the story of farm girl Laurey Williams (Jones) and her courtship by two rival suitors, cowboy Curly McLain (MacRae) and the sinister and frightening farmhand Jud Fry (Steiger). A secondary romance concerns Laurey's friend, Ado Annie (Grahame), and cowboy Will Parker (Nelson), who also has an unwilling rival. A background theme is the territory's aspiration for statehood, and the local conflict between cattlemen and farmers.

Oklahoma! was the first feature film photographed in the Todd-AO 70 mm widescreen process (and was simultaneously filmed in CinemaScope 35mm). It was the only musical directed by veteran filmmaker Zinnemann.

The film was a critical and commercial success, and won three Oscars at the 28th Academy Awards, including Best Scoring of a Musical Picture. In 2007, Oklahoma! was selected for preservation in the United States National Film Registry by the Library of Congress as being "culturally, historically, or aesthetically significant".

== Plot ==
Good-natured cowboy Curly McLain admires the beautiful morning while riding his horse to the farm of Laurey Williams, his secret love, and her aunt, Aunt Eller. At the farm he invites Laurey to a box social being held that night to raise money for a new schoolhouse. Frustrated that he waited so long to ask her, Laurey refuses his invitation. Curly tempts her by describing the surrey he plans to drive her in, then tells her he made the story up to get back at her for refusing him. Laurey gets her own revenge by agreeing to go with their menacing field hand, Jud Fry.

Cowboy Will Parker arrives by train from a trip to Kansas City and seeks out his sweetheart, Ado Annie, who, in Will's absence, has become smitten with itinerant peddler Ali Hakim. Will tells Annie that he has earned the $50 her father, a farmer who does not like cowboys, told him he had to earn before he would allow him to marry Annie, but he spent it all on presents for her. Annie tries to resist Will, but eventually gives in, leaving her torn between Will and Ali.

The townspeople gather at Aunt Eller's farm to refresh themselves before the box social. Gertie, a flirtatious woman with a loud, annoying laugh, flirts with Curly and upsets Laurey, despite her promises to not let his games bother her, and Curly flirts back to make Laurey jealous. Curly asks Laurey again if she will go to the social with him, but Laurey, fearful of Jud, refuses again. Curly angrily confronts Jud in the smokehouse, leading to each man firing his gun. Curly stalks off and Jud again threatens Laurey if she changes her mind. Uncertain what to do, Laurey uses a bottle of smelling salts she bought earlier from Ali, hoping to find her answer in a dream. She dreams that she marries Curly, but Jud eventually kills him.

As Jud drives Laurey to the box social, he tells her he is in love with her and tries to kiss her. She whips the horses, causing them to bolt. Once Jud gets them under control, Laurey leaves Jud behind and drives to the social alone.

At the social, despite the host's encouraging everyone to get along, Ado Annie's father belittles the cowboys, causing a fight to break out which Aunt Eller breaks up. Will makes his $50 back by selling his presents to Ali Hakim, who pays Will more than each gift is worth to get Annie back together with Will. When the auction of ladies' picnic baskets begins, Ali Hakim outbids Will to get Annie's basket so Will won't lose the $50 he needs to marry Annie. Curly and Jud get into a bidding war over Laurey's basket. Curly sells his saddle, horse, and gun to raise enough money to beat Jud's highest bid and win. Laurey fires Jud after he confronts her, and Jud sneers that she will never be rid of him. When Laurey tells Curly what happened, he offers to stay the night at their farm for protection, then goes further and proposes marriage, which Laurey accepts. Meanwhile, Will tells Ado Annie she must stop flirting with other men, despite not being willing to stop flirting with other women. Ali Hakim tells Annie she is better off marrying Will and then resumes his travels.

Weeks later, Curly and Laurey are married. After the ceremony, Jud appears and tries to kill Curly and Laurey by burning them alive atop a haystack. However, Curly leaps down onto Jud, causing Jud to fall on his own knife, killing him. The townspeople hold an impromptu trial in Aunt Eller's kitchen where Curly is found not guilty. He and Laurey leave for their honeymoon, admiring the beautiful morning.

== Cast ==
- Gordon MacRae as Curly McLain
  - James Mitchell as dream Curly (dancer)
- Shirley Jones as Laurey Williams
  - Bambi Linn as dream Laurey (dancer)
- Gene Nelson as Will Parker
- Gloria Grahame as Ado Annie Carnes
- Charlotte Greenwood as Aunt Eller
- Rod Steiger as Jud Fry
- Eddie Albert as Ali Hakim, the Peddler
- James Whitmore as Andrew Carnes
- Barbara Lawrence as Gertie Cummings
- Jay C. Flippen as Skidmore
- Roy Barcroft as Marshal

== Production ==
Interest in a film version of Oklahoma! dates as far back as 1943, when the musical first opened on Broadway. United Artists, Columbia Pictures, 20th Century Fox, and MGM were among the many Hollywood studios interested in the project. Ultimately, the film rights were bought by the Magna Theatre Corporation, a company founded by George Skouras, Joseph Schenck, and Michael Todd for a record $1,000,000 in 1953 (equivalent to approximately $12 million in 2025). Magna was initially founded in order to develop a new widescreen process Todd created, called "Todd-AO", and ended up financing the film independently after a deal with Fox fell through. Including the cost of developing the new process, Magna invested $11 million in the film (equivalent to approximately $132 million in 2025).

Although the film was initially to have been shot on location in the title state, the producers opted to shoot elsewhere, apparently because the oil wells would be a distraction for exterior scenes. Location shooting was done mostly in Nogales, Arizona. The corn field in the opening number as well as the reprise song "Surrey with the Fringe on Top" were shot at the historic Canoa Ranch in Green Valley, Arizona. The train station used in the "Kansas City" routine was located in Elgin, Arizona. Sound stage and backlot sequences were filmed at MGM Studios in Culver City, California.

Oklahoma! was the first production photographed in Todd-AO. The original specification for Todd-AO involved running at 30 frames per second which made it impossible to produce 35mm (which ran at 24 fps) reduction prints from the Todd-AO negative. Therefore, it was simultaneously shot in the more established CinemaScope 35 mm format to allow presentation in theaters lacking 70 mm equipment. Hence, there are actually two different versions of the film comprising different takes. Director Zinnemann mentioned that shooting the film in both formats was a "precautionary measure", since the (converted ca. 1930s Fearless Superfilm 65mm) Todd-AO camera was still being tested during production. Both versions were then processed in Eastmancolor.

It was workable to have the Todd-AO and CinemaScope shooting side-by-side in only about ten scenes. The ultra-wide scope of the Todd-AO lens rarely would permit the CinemaScope camera to work alongside it. The plan was changed very early, and the various scenes were enacted and shot twice." Director of photography Robert Surtees reported:

It is a little difficult for me to put into words how it felt to work with something as totally new as Todd-AO. We started shooting before we even knew whether it was going to work. We had no precedents to go by, not even any technical data to refer to. Every bit of camera, lab, editing and projection equipment had to be specially designed and built as we went along—often on feverish deadlines just ahead of our shooting schedule. We felt like real pioneers—but there was a spirit there, a spark of excitement generated throughout a wonderfully loyal and competent crew working together to produce something very special. It was an experience I'll never forget.

The many actors who tried out for the role of Curly included James Dean and Paul Newman. According to TCM, Dean "made a sensational [screen] test with Rod Steiger in the 'Poor Jud Is Dead' number", but because his voice wasn't strong enough, Gordon MacRae was cast in the main role. Steiger remarked that Dean "hadn't quite got his technique together. At the time of his death, he was working too much on instinct. He'd be brilliant in one scene and then blow the next". He observed that Dean was a "nice kid absorbed by his own ego, so much so that it was destroying him", which he thinks led to his death. Dean reportedly gave him his prized copy of Ernest Hemingway's book Death in the Afternoon, and had underlined every occurrence of the word "death". Joanne Woodward was offered the role of Laurey, which went to Shirley Jones (who had previously performed in a stage production of Oklahoma!). Eli Wallach and Ernest Borgnine were considered for the role of Jud before Rod Steiger was cast.

Robert Russell Bennett expanded his Broadway orchestrations, Jay Blackton conducted, and Agnes de Mille again choreographed. Costume designer Orry-Kelly was hired to oversee the costumes for the film with Ann Roth as his assistant.

=== From stage to screen ===
Rodgers and Hammerstein personally oversaw the film to prevent the studio from making changes of the kind that were then typical of stage-to-film musical adaptations—such as putting in new songs by different composers. They also maintained artistic control over the film versions of several of their other stage musicals.

The film Oklahoma! followed the original stage version extremely closely, more so than any other Rodgers and Hammerstein stage-to-film adaptation. However, it did divide the very long (more than 45 minutes) first scene into several shorter scenes, changing the locations of several of the songs in the process.

- Rather than beginning offstage, "Oh, What a Beautiful Mornin'" was now sung as Curly (Gordon MacRae) rode his horse from the now-seen cornfield "as high as a [sic] elephant's eye" to Aunt Eller's farm.
- "Kansas City" was sung and danced at the local train station where Aunt Eller (Charlotte Greenwood) and other cowboys meet Will Parker (Gene Nelson), who has just returned from that city. Also, a few lyrics in the song, about a burlesque stripteaser, had to undergo minor changes to pass film censorship. In the original Broadway musical, the character of Will Parker sings:

I could swear that she was padded from her shoulder to her heel.
But later in the second act when she began to peel,
She proved that everything she had was absolutely real!

For the film, these were changed to:

But then she started dancing and her dancing made me feel
That every single thing she had was absolutely real!

- "I Can't Say No" was sung by Ado Annie (Gloria Grahame) at a lakeside where Laurey has been swimming.
- "Many a New Day" was sung and danced in Laurey's (Shirley Jones) bedroom, as the women, stopping over at the farmhouse on their way to the Skidmore ranch, change their clothes for the upcoming box social that evening.

In a nod to Green Grow the Lilacs, which was the basis of Oklahoma!, Jud attempts to get revenge on Curly and Laurey by burning a haystack they stand on after the wedding, rather than simply attacking Curly with a knife, as in the stage version of the musical. As Curly and Laurey stand atop the burning haystack, Jud pulls a knife and taunts Curly. The couple jumps down, with Curly landing on Jud and inadvertently causing him to fall on his own knife.

The film omitted very little from the stage production, cutting only two songs (Ali Hakim's "It's a Scandal, It's a Outrage" Jud's "Lonely Room" and one verse from "Oh What a Beautiful Mornin"), and thus ran two-and-a-half hours, much longer than most other screen musicals of the time. It was the first of the huge roadshow musical films that would eventually overrun Hollywood in the 1960s.

== Musical numbers ==
- "Overture" – Orchestra (played before the film actually begins)
- "Main Title" – Orchestra (played over the opening credits)
- "Oh, What a Beautiful Mornin'" – Curly
- "Laurey's Entrance" ("Oh, What a Beautiful Mornin'") – Laurey
- "The Surrey with the Fringe on Top" – Curly
- "The Surrey with the Fringe on Top" (Reprise) – Curly
- "Kansas City" – Will, Aunt Eller, Male Ensemble
- "I Cain't Say No" – Ado Annie
- "I Cain't Say No" (Reprise) – Will and Ado Annie
- "Entrance of Ensemble" ("Oh What a Beautiful Mornin'") – Curly, Gertie, and Ensemble
- "Many a New Day" – Laurey and Female Ensemble
- "People Will Say We're in Love" – Curly and Laurey
- "Pore Jud Is Daid" – Curly and Jud
- "Out of My Dreams" – Laurey and Female Ensemble
- "Dream Ballet" – Ensemble
- "Entr'acte" – Orchestra
- "The Farmer and the Cowman" – Carnes, Aunt Eller, Ike Skidmore, Ensemble
- "All Er Nuthin'" – Will and Ado Annie
- "People Will Say We're in Love" (Reprise) – Curly and Laurey
- "Oklahoma" – Curly and Ensemble
- "Finale Ultimo" ("Oh What a Beautiful Mornin'") – Ensemble
- "Exit Music" ("Oklahoma" (Instrumental Reprise)) – Orchestra
- "Exit Music #2" ("People Will Say We're in Love" (Instrumental Reprise)) – Orchestra

== Release ==
Magna held invitational screenings of Oklahoma! over three days at the Rivoli Theatre in New York City starting on October 11, 1955. The official public premiere was on October 13. The film was shown on a two-a-day reserved seat policy with three shows at the weekends and holidays and grossed $573,493 in its first 12 weeks in New York. The film opened on the same roadshow basis at Grauman's Egyptian Theatre in Los Angeles on November 18 and then at the McVicker's Theater in Chicago on December 26.

In its initial theatrical release, the Magna Theatre Corporation handled distribution of the roadshow presentations in 70 mm Todd-AO. In 29 American and two Canadian cities it grossed $8,970,087 from 4,672,184 patrons.

RKO Radio Pictures distributed the general release version (in 35 mm anamorphic CinemaScope), which was released after its roadshow run ended. Later, when RKO was experiencing financial turmoil, 20th Century Fox assumed distribution of the general release edition.

Outside the United States, the film was a box office disappointment.

All rights to the film are owned by the estates of Rodgers and Hammerstein. In 1982, the US and Canadian distribution rights to this film were acquired by The Samuel Goldwyn Company and re-issued both the 70 mm and 35 mm versions theatrically. The original 70mm version was restored and screened for the first time since its initial engagements.

In April 2014, a restored version of the Todd-AO version was screened at the Fifth Annual TCM Classic Film Festival in Hollywood. The eight-month restoration was developed in conjunction with 20th Century Fox.

=== First telecast ===
The Cinemascope version of the film was first telecast as a Thanksgiving Day special by CBS, on the evening of November 26, 1970. Unlike some later telecasts of the film, this one was presented complete and uncut, except for the Overture, Entr'acte, and Exit Music. As with its 1960s telecasts of The Wizard of Oz, CBS felt that the film needed a host to introduce it, so they brought in Sebastian Cabot, Anissa Jones, Johnny Whitaker, and Kathy Garver, all from the long-running CBS sitcom Family Affair, to serve as hosts. The four of them, rather than appearing as themselves, spoke their lines in character, as if they were still playing their roles from the series. Because the film was shown on a Thursday evening, it occupied the same time slot in which Family Affair was shown in 1970, which explains the selection of the four actors from the show to host the film. It earned a Nielsen rating of 27.9 and an audience share of 47%.

=== Home media ===
For unexplained reasons the original UK DVD release is a pan and scan version from a noticeably grainy CinemaScope print, even though the companion DVD of South Pacific was taken from a pristine Todd-AO master and presented in widescreen. The 50th Anniversary US DVD release of Oklahoma! by partial rights holder 20th Century Fox is a double-disc release that includes both the CinemaScope and original 70 mm Todd-AO versions in widescreen. The Todd-AO version has an Overture, intermission with Entr'acte, and Exit Music. The CinemaScope version is without intermission or any traditional roadshow features. Shirley Jones does audio commentary on the Todd-AO presentation. In March 2006 this version was also released in the UK as part of a set of remastered Rodgers & Hammerstein DVDs.

In 2014, 20th Century Fox released in the US a special 4-disc Blu-ray and DVD combo set, with both Todd-AO and CinemaScope 35 versions. The Todd-AO version was superior in definition to the Cinemascope version in this release.

In 2021, it was announced that the film would stream on Disney+ beginning April 30, 2021, following the acquisition of 21st Century Fox by The Walt Disney Company. The Todd-AO version was used on the app. In 2022, it was announced that the film would stream on the Criterion Channel starting January 2023. In April 2023, the Disney Plus service removed the film from its services in all countries. As of November 2023, the film was not offered by the Criterion Channel, but the non-roadshow version in CinemaScope was streaming on Prime Video.

== Reception ==
=== Critical response ===
The film received a rave review from The New York Times, and was voted a "New York Times Critics Pick".

=== Awards and nominations ===
Award	Category	Nominee(s)	Result	Ref.
Academy Awards	Best Cinematography – Color	Robert Surtees	Nominated	
Academy Awards	Best Film Editing	Gene Ruggiero and George Boemler	Nominated	
Academy Awards	Best Scoring of a Musical Picture	Robert Russell Bennett, Jay Blackton, and Adolph Deutsch	Won	
Academy Awards	Best Sound Recording	Fred Hynes	Won	
National Film Preservation Board	National Film Registry		Inducted	
Satellite Awards	Best Classic DVD	Oklahoma! (part of the Rodgers & Hammerstein Box Set Collection)	Nominated	
Writers Guild of America Awards	Best Written American Musical	Sonya Levien and William Ludwig	Nominated	

In 2007, Oklahoma! was selected for preservation in the United States National Film Registry by the Library of Congress as being "culturally, historically, or aesthetically significant".

== See also ==
- List of American films of 1955
- Oklahoma! (soundtrack)
- Green Grow the Lilacs (1931 play)
