= Katharine Sergava =

American actress (1910?–2005)

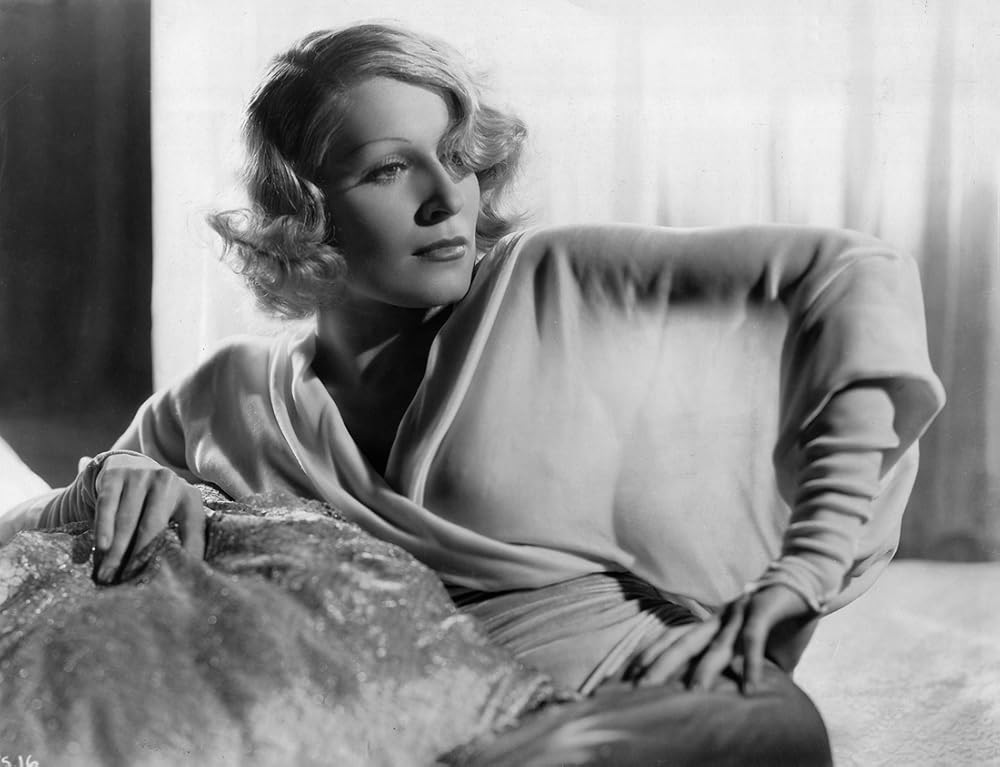
- Sergava in Bedside (1934)
- Born: July 30, 1910; Tbilisi, Georgia
- Died: November 26, 2005 (aged 95); New York City, New York
- Other name: Katharine Sergava Szyncer
- Occupations: Film, television actress
- Spouse: Bernard Sznycer

Katharine Sergava (later Sznycer; July 30, 1910 – November 26, 2005) was an actress and dancer.

== Early years ==
Sergava was born in Tiflis in the country of Georgia. She and her family moved to London during the Russian Revolution. She studied ballet and drama there and in Paris before moving to the United States.

== Career ==
She was best known for portraying both Ellen and the dream-ballet version of Laurey, the heroine, in the premiere of Oklahoma!. She later performed in ''Look Ma, I'm Dancing,'' choreographed by Jerome Robbins. Another of her Broadway appearances was in The Threepenny Opera (1955). She had also appeared in several films and TV shows.

Sergava danced with the Ballet Theater, Mordkin Ballet, and Original Ballet Russe.

In 2003, she was erroneously reported dead in The Daily Telegraph and The New York Times.

She lived in retirement in Greenwich Village, New York City. For more than three decades she was a drama instructor at HB Studio in New York.

== Personal life and death ==
Sergava was married to Bernard Sznycer, who died in 1970. She died on November 26, 2005, in her Manhattan home.
