= Oklahoma! =

Musical by Rodgers and Hammerstein

- Original Broadway poster (1943)
- Music: Richard Rodgers
- Lyrics: Oscar Hammerstein II
- Book: Oscar Hammerstein II
- Basis: Green Grow the Lilacs by Lynn Riggs
- Productions: 1943 Broadway; 1944 National tour; 1947 West End; 1951 Broadway revival; 1979 Broadway revival; 1980 West End revival; 1998 West End revival; 2002 Broadway revival; 2003 US tour; 2010 UK tour; 2015 UK tour; 2019 Broadway revival; 2021 US tour; 2023 West End revival
- Awards: 1944 special Pulitzer Prize; 1993 Special Tony Award (50th Anniversary); 1999 Olivier Award for Best Musical Revival; 2019 Tony Award for Best Revival of a Musical; 2023 Olivier Award for Best Musical Revival

Oklahoma! is a musical written by the duo of Rodgers and Hammerstein. Based on Lynn Riggs's 1931 play Green Grow the Lilacs, it is set in farm country outside the town of Claremore, Indian Territory, in 1906, and tells the story of farm girl Laurey Williams and her courtship by rival suitors, cowboy Curly McLain and the frightening farmhand Jud Fry. A secondary romance concerns cowboy Will Parker and his flirtatious fiancée, Ado Annie.

The original Broadway production opened on March 31, 1943. It was a box office hit and ran for an unprecedented 2,212 performances, later enjoying award-winning revivals, national tours, foreign productions and an Oscar-winning 1955 film adaptation. It has long been a popular choice for school and community productions. Oklahoma! was Rodgers and Hammerstein's first pairing on a musical, and won a special Pulitzer Prize in 1944.

This musical, building on the innovations of the earlier Show Boat, epitomized the development of the "book musical", a musical play in which the songs and dances are fully integrated into a well-made story, with serious dramatic goals, that evokes genuine emotions other than amusement. In addition, Oklahoma! features musical themes, or motifs, that recur throughout the work to connect the music and story. A fifteen-minute "dream ballet" reflects Laurey's struggle with her feelings about two men, Curly and Jud.

== Background ==
By the early 1940s, Rodgers and Hammerstein were each well known for creating Broadway hits with other collaborators. Rodgers, with Lorenz Hart, had produced over two dozen musicals since the 1920s, including such popular successes as Babes in Arms (1937), The Boys from Syracuse (1938) and Pal Joey (1940). Among other successes, Hammerstein had written the words for Rose-Marie (1924), The Desert Song (1926), The New Moon (1927) and Show Boat (1927). Though less productive in the 1930s, he wrote musicals, songs and films, sharing an Academy Award for his song with Jerome Kern, "The Last Time I Saw Paris", which was included in the 1941 film Lady Be Good. By the early 1940s, Hart had sunk into alcoholism and emotional turmoil, and he became unreliable, prompting Rodgers to approach Hammerstein to ask if he would consider working with him.

=== Conception ===
In 1931, the Theatre Guild produced Lynn Riggs's Green Grow the Lilacs, a play about settlers in Oklahoma Indian Territory. Though the play was not successful, ten years later in 1941, Theresa Helburn, one of the Guild's producers, saw a summer-stock production supplemented with traditional folk songs and square dances and decided the play could be the basis of a musical that might revive the struggling Guild. She contacted Richard Rodgers and Lorenz Hart, whose first successful collaboration, The Garrick Gaieties, had been produced by the Theatre Guild in 1925. Rodgers wanted to work on the project and obtained the rights for himself and Hart. Rodgers had asked Oscar Hammerstein II to collaborate with him and Hart. During the tryouts of Rodgers and Hart's By Jupiter in 1941, Hammerstein had assured Rodgers that if Hart was ever unable to work, he would be willing to take his place. Coincidentally in 1942, Hammerstein had thought of turning Green Grow the Lilacs into a musical, but when he had approached Jerome Kern about it, the latter declined. Hammerstein learned that Rodgers was seeking someone to write the book, and he eagerly took the opportunity. Hart lost interest in the musical; he preferred contemporary, urbane shows that showcased his witty lyric writing, and he found the farmers and cowhands in Green Grow the Lilacs corny and uninspiring. Moreover, spiraling downward, consumed by his longstanding alcoholism, Hart no longer felt like writing. He embarked on a vacation to Mexico, advising Rodgers that Hammerstein would be a good choice of a new collaborator.

This partnership allowed both Rodgers and Hammerstein to follow their preferred writing methods: Hammerstein preferred to write a complete lyric before it was set to music, and Rodgers preferred to set completed lyrics to music. In Rodgers' previous collaborations with Hart, Rodgers had always written the music first, since the unfocused Hart needed something on which to base his lyrics. Hammerstein's previous collaborators included composers Rudolf Friml, Herbert Stothart, Vincent Youmans, and Kern, who all wrote music first, for which Hammerstein then wrote lyrics. The role reversal in the Rodgers and Hammerstein partnership permitted Hammerstein to craft the lyrics into a fundamental part of the story so that the songs could amplify and intensify the story instead of diverting it. As Rodgers and Hammerstein began developing the new musical, they agreed that their musical and dramatic choices would be dictated by the source material, Green Grow the Lilacs, not by musical comedy conventions. Musicals of that era featured big production numbers, novelty acts, and show-stopping specialty dances; the libretti typically focused on humor, with little dramatic development, punctuated with songs that effectively halted the story for their duration.

=== Casting and development ===
Between the world wars, roles in musicals were usually filled by actors who could sing, but Rodgers and Hammerstein chose, conversely, to cast singers who could act. Though Theresa Helburn, codirector of the Theatre Guild, suggested Shirley Temple as Laurey and Groucho Marx as Ali Hakim, Rodgers and Hammerstein, with director Rouben Mamoulian's support, insisted that performers more dramatically appropriate for the roles be cast. As a result, there were no stars in the production, another unusual step. The production was choreographed by Agnes de Mille, her first musical on Broadway). De Mille provided one of the show's most notable and enduring features: a 15-minute first-act ballet finale (often referred to as the dream ballet) depicting Laurey's struggle to evaluate her suitors, Jud and Curly.

The first title given to the work was Away We Go! which opened for out-of-town-tryouts in New Haven's Shubert Theatre on March 11, 1943. Expectations for the show were low; Hammerstein had written six flops in a row, and the show had no star power. Producer Mike Todd walked out after the first act during the tryout and wisecracked, "No girls, no gags, no chance." But Rodgers and Hammerstein were confident. The New Haven and Boston audiences were enthusiastic, although the reviews were only fair. Of the changes made before the show went to Broadway, two would prove significant: the dramatic restaging of the show-stopping musical number, "Oklahoma" and the decision to retitle the musical after that number.

Todd had been wrong; the show opened on Broadway to raves from the critics, sold out, and won a special Pulitzer Prize. Brooks Atkinson wrote in The New York Times that the show's opening number, "Oh, What a Beautiful Mornin'" changed the history of musical theater: "After a verse like that, sung to a buoyant melody, the banalities of the old musical stage became intolerable." The New York Post was the only major paper to give Oklahoma! a mixed review. Its critic felt that while the songs were pleasant enough, they sounded much alike. The show's creativity stimulated Rodgers and Hammerstein's contemporaries and ushered in the "Golden Age" of American musical theatre.

== Plot ==
=== Act I ===
In Oklahoma Territory, in 1906, cowboy Curly McLain looks forward to a beautiful day as he visits farm girl Laurey Williams's yard ("Oh, What a Beautiful Mornin'"). He and Laurey tease each other, while her Aunt Eller looks on. There will be a box social dance that night, which includes an auction of lunch baskets prepared by the local women to raise funds for a schoolhouse. Each man who wins a basket will eat lunch with the lady who prepared it. Curly asks Laurey to go with him, but she refuses, feeling that he has waited too long. To persuade her, he says he will take her in the finest carriage money can buy ("The Surrey with the Fringe on Top"), but she teases him about it until he says he made it up to get back at her. She flounces off, not realizing that he really has rented such a surrey.

The lonely, disturbed farmhand Jud Fry has become obsessed with Laurey and asks her to the dance. She accepts to spite Curly, although she is afraid of Jud. Meanwhile, cowboy Will Parker returns from a trip to modern Kansas City, and shows off his souvenirs ("Kansas City"). He won $50 ($1,800 today) at the fair, which, according to his girlfriend Ado Annie's father, Andrew Carnes, is the amount he needs to marry Ado Annie. Unfortunately, he spent all the money on gifts for her and one for her father: a Little Wonder (a metal tube used for looking at pictures, but with a hidden blade inside). He is unaware of its deadly secret. Later, Ado Annie confesses to Laurey that while Will was away, she has spent a lot of time with Ali Hakim, a Persian peddler. Laurey says she'll have to choose between them, but Ado Annie insists she loves them both ("I Cain't Say No"). Laurey and her friends prepare for the social, while Gertie Cummings flirts with Curly. Laurey notices and tells her friends that she doesn't really care about Curly ("Many a New Day").

Andrew Carnes sees Annie with Ali Hakim; he forces Hakim at gunpoint to agree to marry her. Hakim and the other men lament the unfairness of the situation ("It's a Scandal! It's a Outrage!"). Curly discovers that Laurey is going to the box social with Jud and tries to convince her to go with him instead. Afraid to tell Jud she won't go with him, Laurey protests that she does not love Curly ("People Will Say We're in Love"). Hurt by her refusal, Curly goes to the smokehouse where Jud lives to talk with him. Curly jokingly suggests that since Jud does not feel appreciated, he could hang himself, and everyone would realize how much they care about him ("Pore Jud Is Daid"). Their talk turns into an ominous confrontation about Laurey. After Curly leaves, Jud's resolve to win Laurey becomes even stronger, and he vows to make her his bride ("Lonely Room").

Confused by her feelings for Curly and her fear of Jud, Laurey purchases a "magic potion" (laudanum) from Ali Hakim, which the unscrupulous peddler guarantees will reveal her true love. She muses on leaving her dreams of love behind and joining the man she loves ("Out of My Dreams"). Soon asleep under the influence of the opiate, in an extended ballet sequence, Laurey first dreams of marriage with Curly. Her dream takes a nightmarish turn when Jud appears and kills Curly; she cannot escape him, confused by her desires ("Dream Ballet"). Awakening, she realizes that Curly is the right man for her, but it is too late to change her mind about going to the dance with Jud, who arrives, and they leave for the box social.

=== Act II ===
At the social, during a square dance ("The Farmer and the Cowman"), the rivalry between the local farmers and cowboys over fences and water rights leads to fighting, which Aunt Eller ends by firing a gun to silence everyone. Laurey is upset when she sees Curly at the dance with Gertie. To rid himself of Ado Annie, Ali Hakim buys Will's souvenirs from Kansas City for $50. Jud also contributes to this by purchasing Will's Little Wonder, knowing of the blade concealed within it. The auction starts and Will bids $50 on Ado Annie's basket, not realizing that without the $50, he would not have the money to pay her father. Desperate to be rid of Ado Annie, the peddler bids $51 to get the basket so that Will can approach Andrew Carnes with the $50 and claim Ado Annie as his bride. The auction becomes much more serious when Laurey's basket comes up for auction. Jud has saved all his money so he can win Laurey's basket. Various men bid, trying to protect Laurey, but Jud outbids them all. Curly and Jud engage in a ferocious bidding war, and Curly sells his saddle, his horse, and even his gun to raise money. Curly outbids Jud and wins the basket. Jud discreetly tries to kill Curly with the Little Wonder, but his plan is foiled when Aunt Eller (knowing what is happening) loudly asks Curly for a dance. Later that night, Will and Annie work out their differences, as she reluctantly agrees not to flirt with other men ("All Er Nuthin'").

Jud confronts Laurey about his feelings for her. When she admits that she does not return them, he threatens her. She then fires him as her farmhand, demanding that he get off her property. Jud furiously threatens Laurey before he departs; she bursts into tears and calls for Curly. She tells him that she has fired Jud and is frightened by what Jud might do now. Curly reassures her and proposes to her, and she accepts ("People Will Say We're In Love" (reprise)). He realizes that he must now become a farmer. Ali Hakim decides to leave the territory and bids Ado Annie goodbye, telling her Will is the man she should marry.

Three weeks later, Laurey and Curly are married as everyone celebrates the territory's impending statehood ("Oklahoma"). Ali Hakim returns with Gertie, whom he has recently married after being threatened by her father with a shotgun. A drunken Jud reappears, kisses Laurey and punches Curly, and they begin a fistfight. Jud attacks Curly with a knife, and Curly dodges, causing Jud to fall on his own knife. Jud soon dies. The wedding guests hold a makeshift trial for Curly, at Aunt Eller's urging. The judge, Andrew Carnes, declares the verdict: "not guilty!" Curly and Laurey depart on their honeymoon in the surrey with the fringe on top ("Finale Ultimo").

== Principal roles and notable performers ==
Sources shown in Productions section except as stated here.

	Description	Notable stage performers in major market productions
Curly McLain	A cowboy in love with Laurey	Alfred Drake°, Harry Stockwell°, John Raitt, Howard Keel, Ridge Bond, Hugh Jackman, Patrick Wilson, Laurence Guittard, Damon Daunno, Sean Grandillo, Arthur Darvill
Laurey Williams	Aunt Eller's niece	Joan Roberts°, Betty Jane Watson, Christine Andreas, Josefina Gabrielle, Florence Henderson, Rebecca Naomi Jones, Sasha Hutchings, Mary Hatcher, Isabel Bigley
Jud Fry	A hired hand on Aunt Eller's ranch	Howard da Silva°, Shuler Hensley, Martin Vidnovic, Alfred Molina
Aunt Eller	Laurey's aunt	Betty Garde°, Mary Wickes, Andrea Martin, Maureen Lipman, Mary Testa, Liza Sadovy, Patty Duke, Margaret Hamilton,
Ado Annie Carnes	A young woman	Celeste Holm°, Barbara Cook, Christine Ebersole, Ali Stroker, Marisha Wallace, Shelley Winters, Barbara Cook, Marisha Wallace
Will Parker	A young man in love with Ado Annie	Lee Dixon°, Harry Groener
Andrew Carnes	Ado Annie's father	Ralph Riggs°
Ali Hakim	A Persian peddler	Joseph Buloff°, Peter Polycarpou, Bruce Adler, Will Brill, Eddie Albert
Gertie Cummings	A farm girl	Jane Lawrence°, Pamela Britton
Dream Curly	Curly in the dream sequence	Marc Platt°
Dream Laurey	Laurey in the dream sequence	Katharine Sergava°

° denotes original Broadway cast

== Musical numbers ==
Act I

- Overture – Orchestra
- "Oh, What a Beautiful Mornin'" – Curly
- Laurey's Entrance – Laurey & Curly
- "The Surrey with the Fringe on Top" – Curly, Laurey, & Aunt Eller
- "Kansas City" – Will Parker, Aunt Eller, Male Ensemble
- "I Cain't Say No" – Ado Annie
- Entrance of Ensemble ("I Cain't Say No" and "Oh What a Beautiful Mornin'") – Will, Ado Annie, Curly, Aunt Eller & Ensemble
- "Many a New Day" – Laurey and Female Ensemble
- "It's a Scandal! It's a Outrage!" – Ali Hakim & Ensemble
- "People Will Say We're in Love" – Curly & Laurey
- "Pore Jud Is Daid" – Curly & Jud
- "Lonely Room" – Jud
- "Out of My Dreams"/"Dream Ballet" – Laurey & Dream Figures

Act II

- Entr'acte – Orchestra
- "The Farmer and the Cowman" – Andrew Carnes, Aunt Eller, Curly, Will, Ado Annie, Laurey & Ensemble
- "All Er Nuthin'" – Will & Ado Annie
- "People Will Say We're in Love" (Reprise) – Curly & Laurey
- "Oklahoma" – Curly, Laurey, Aunt Eller, Ike Skidmore, Fred, Andrew Carnes & Ensemble
- Finale Ultimo ("Oh What a Beautiful Mornin'" and "People Will Say We're in Love") – Company

== Production history ==
=== Original Broadway ===
The original Broadway production opened on March 31, 1943, at the St. James Theatre in New York City. It was directed by Rouben Mamoulian, choreographed by Agnes de Mille and starred Alfred Drake (Curly), Joan Roberts (Laurey), Celeste Holm (Ado Annie), Howard da Silva (Jud Fry), Betty Garde (Aunt Eller), Lee Dixon (Will Parker), Joseph Buloff (Ali Hakim), Jane Lawrence (Gertie), Barry Kelley (Ike) and George S. Irving (Joe). Marc Platt danced the role of "Dream Curly", Katharine Sergava danced the part of "Dream Laurey" and the small dancing part of Aggie was played by Bambi Linn. George Church danced the part of "Dream Jud". Church was replaced by Vladimir Kostenko. The production's scenic designer was Lemuel Ayers.

The production ran for 2,212 performances, finally closing on May 29, 1948. "The demand for tickets was unprecedented as the show became more popular in the months that followed" the opening. Oklahoma! ran for over five years, a Broadway record that "would not be bested until My Fair Lady (1956)." The Tony Awards and other awards now given for achievement in musical theatre were not in existence in 1943, and therefore the original production of Oklahoma! received no theatrical awards.

=== Early U.S. tours ===
The first of several national tours began in New Haven, Connecticut, in 1943. A 1953 article in The New York Times reported that the show was "believed to be the only musical to have enjoyed a consecutive run of ten years. It ran on Broadway for five years and two months, grossing $7,000,000. The tour of the national company, which started late in 1943, has grossed $15,000,000." These tours reached 250 cities. Harry Stockwell was Curly. John Raitt played Curly in Chicago, Detroit and Milwaukee, before joining the Broadway cast. The United Service Organizations sponsored a tour to U.S. military bases in 1945 that lasted for several years. The New York Times reported in 1953:

The tenth anniversary of the Broadway opening of Oklahoma! will be celebrated in Washington, where the Theatre Guild's touring company of the phenomenal musical will be playing at that time. ... According to a Guild estimate, "upwards of 20,000,000 people thus far have seen the show in the United States, England, Sweden, Denmark, South Africa, Australia and through [the U.S.O. shows] during the war".

=== Original West End ===
Oklahoma! was the first of a post-war wave of Broadway musicals to reach London's West End. It starred Howard Keel (then known as Harold Keel) and Betty Jane Watson, opening at the Theatre Royal, Drury Lane, on April 30, 1947, to rave press reviews and sellout houses, running for 1,543 performances. A pre-London run opened a day late at the Manchester Opera House on April 18, 1947, after the ship carrying the cast, scenery, and costumes ran aground on a sandbank off Southampton.

=== Original Australian ===
An Australian production opened at His Majesty's Theatre, Melbourne, on February 19, 1949. Gemze de Lappe choreographed and played Dream Laurey. It transferred to the Theatre Royal, Adelaide, on September 17, 1949, the Theatre Royal, Sydney, on November 29, 1949, and His Majesty's Theatre, Brisbane, on November 29, 1950. The production was choreographed by Matt Mattox who also played the role of Dream Curly.

=== 1951 and 1979 Broadway revivals ===
A 1951 revival produced by the Theatre Guild opened at The Broadway Theatre on May 9, 1951, and ran for 100 performances. Ridge Bond played Curly, Patricia Northrop played Laurey, Henry Clarke was Jud, and Jacqueline Sundt played Ado Annie. Mamoulian and de Mille returned to direct and choreograph, and the production was restaged by Jerome Whyte. In 1953, a 10th anniversary revival opened on August 31 at the New York City Center Theatre. It ran for a limited engagement of 40 performances before going on tour. The cast included Florence Henderson as Laurey, Ridge Bond as Curly and Barbara Cook as Annie. Mamoulian and De Mille directed and choreographed.

A 1979 revival opened at the Palace Theatre on Broadway on December 13, 1979, and closed on August 24, 1980, running for 293 performances and nine previews. William Hammerstein (Oscar's son) directed, and Gemze de Lappe recreated Agnes De Mille's choreography. The show starred Laurence Guittard as Curly, Christine Andreas as Laurey, Mary Wickes as Aunt Eller, Christine Ebersole as Ado Annie, Martin Vidnovic as Jud Fry, Harry Groener as Will Parker and Bruce Adler as Ali Hakim. Andreas and Groener both received Tony Award nominations for their performances, and Vidnovic won a Drama Desk Award. This production started as a cross-country national tour, beginning at the Pantages Theatre in Los Angeles on May 1, 1979.

=== 1980 West End revival ===
The following year, James Hammerstein directed a production at the Haymarket Theatre, Leicester, in January 1980, produced by Cameron Mackintosh and Emile Litler. The De Mille choreography was again adapted by de Lappe. A UK tour followed, and it eventually settled in the West End, opening at the Palace Theatre, London, on September 17, 1980, and running until September 19, 1981. This production starred John Diedrich as Curly and Alfred Molina as Jud Fry, both of whom were nominated for Olivier Awards. Rosamund Shelley played Laurey, Madge Ryan was Aunt Eller and Linal Haft was Ali Hakim. The production was Maria Friedman's debut in the West End, initially in the chorus role of Doris, but she was eventually promoted to the leading role. Sets and costumes were designed by Tim Goodchild. Ray Cook was Musical Director and John Owen Edwards Conductor (Owen Edwards became Musical Director for Mackintosh's 1998 London revival). A cast recording of this production was issued by JAY Records and on the Showtime! label.

=== 1982 Australian revival ===
John Diedrich reprised his role as Curly for the national 1982–1983 tour of his native Australia. Again presented by Cameron Mackintosh, the tour was produced by the Adelaide Festival Centre Trust, Edgley International and The MLC Theatre Royal Company. It opened at the Adelaide Festival Theatre on April 30, 1982, transferred to the Theatre Royal, Sydney on June 5, 1982, then to Her Majestys Theatre, Melbourne on November 8, 1982, and concluded at Her Majesty's Theatre, Brisbane in April 1983. The cast included Henri Szeps as Ali Hakim and Neil Melville in an ensemble role. Direction was again by William Hammerstein, the De Mille choreography again adapted by de Lappe, with sets and costumes again by Tim Goodchild. This was the musical theatre debut for Caroline O'Connor as an ensemble player and swing/understudy.

=== 1998 West End revival ===
Hugh Jackman on the cover of the DVD of the London revival

A dark-themed production of the musical was presented by the National Theatre in London at the Olivier Theatre, opening on July 15, 1998. The production team included Trevor Nunn (director), Susan Stroman (choreographer) and William David Brohn (orchestrator). The international cast included Hugh Jackman as Curly, Josefina Gabrielle as Laurey, Maureen Lipman as Aunt Eller, Shuler Hensley as Jud Fry, Vicki Simon as Ado Annie, and Peter Polycarpou as Ali Hakim. Musical director John Owen Edwards, Brohn and dance arranger David Krane adapted Robert Russell Bennett's original orchestrations and extended some of the dance sequences. A new Dream Ballet was composed for Susan Stroman's new choreography, and the dances to "Kansas City", "Many a New Day" and "The Farmer and the Cowman" were all redesigned. The overture was also altered, at the request of Nunn. Jackman and Gabrielle performed the ballet themselves.

The production received nine Olivier Award nominations, winning for Outstanding Musical Production, supporting actor (Hensley), set design (Anthony Ward) and choreography (Stroman). According to the Rodgers & Hammerstein Organization, the limited engagement was a sell-out and broke all previous box office records, and so the show was transferred to the Lyceum Theatre in the West End for a six-month run. Plans to transfer to Broadway with the London cast were thwarted by Actors' Equity, which insisted that American actors must be cast. Eventually a U.S. cast was selected. The London production was filmed live and issued on DVD, as well as being broadcast on US public television in November 2003. The live recording was given a limited theatrical re-release on July 16 and 19, 2023, celebrating its 25th anniversary and the musical's 80th anniversary.

=== 2002 Broadway revival ===
The London production was repeated on Broadway at the Gershwin Theatre on March 21, 2002, with direction by Nunn. The production closed on February 23, 2003, after 388 performances. Only two of the London cast, Josefina Gabrielle as Laurey and Shuler Hensley as Jud, were in the production, which also featured Patrick Wilson as Curly, Andrea Martin as Aunt Eller, Jessica Boevers as Ado Annie and Aasif Mandvi as Ali Hakim. It was nominated for seven Tony Awards, including Best Revival of a Musical, Best Featured Actress in a Musical and Best Featured Actor in a Musical (which was awarded to Hensley). The musical was also nominated for nine Drama Desk Awards, with Hensley winning as Outstanding Featured Actor in a Musical and Susan Stroman winning for choreography.

Ben Brantley wrote in The New York Times: "At its best, which is usually when it's dancing, this resurrection of Rodgers and Hammerstein's epochal show is dewy with an adolescent lustiness, both carnal and naive, exuberant and confused." The review stated that "Anthony Ward's harmoniously curved set, in which the sky seems to stretch into eternity, again pulses with the promise of a land on the verge of transformation." The New York Daily News review commented that "Visually, this one is stunning – at times, Anthony Ward's sets have a pastoral, idyllic quality, like Thomas Hart Benton's paintings. At other times, especially in lighting designer David Hersey's lustrous palette, they convey the bleakness of the frontier." The review also stated that the Royal National Theatre "brought it back to us in a way that makes it seem fresh and vital." However, USA Today gave the production a tepid assessment, its reviewer writing: "A cold breeze blows through this beautiful mornin', and that golden haze is never quite bright enough." The production went on to tour nationally from 2003 to 2005.

=== 2019 Broadway revival; 2022 London transfer ===
Following a 2015 workshop at Bard College and a 2018 run at Brooklyn's St. Ann's Warehouse, a 75th anniversary staging of Oklahoma! transferred to Broadway at Circle in the Square Theatre. The production was directed by Daniel Fish in an intimate, immersive in-the-round style, set in a community hall, with chili and cornbread served to the audience at intermission. The production's most important tonal change involved the character of Jud Fry. Instead of the sinister brooding and threatening Jud of the original production, in the revival he was described by Elisabeth Vincentelli in The New Yorker as "a proto-incel", and his death came not as an accident but as an intended act at the hands of Curly, followed by a sham trial to clear Curly of the blame.

The production began preview performances on March 19, 2019, and officially opened on April 7 for a limited run through January 19, 2020. It starred Damon Daunno as Curly, Rebecca Naomi Jones as Laurey, Ali Stroker as Ado Annie, James Davis as Will Parker, Will Brill as Ali Hakim, Patrick Vaill as Jud and Mary Testa as Aunt Eller. The production featured choreography by John Heginbotham and music arrangements by Daniel Kluger, performed by a seven-piece band. The production was nominated for eight Tony Awards and won Best Revival of a Musical and Best Featured Actress in a Musical for Stroker, making her the first wheelchair user to win a Tony.

For the 2021–2022 national tour, Fish rethought the presentation, which remained expressionistic but substituted a proscenium back-drop, which "renders the original authorial intents far more in balance with the radical ideas of the production", allowing the cast to play their parts with a contemporary naturalism, according to Chicago Tribune critic Chris Jones. The cast included Sasha Hutchings as Laurey, Sean Grandillo as Curly and Barbara Walsh as Aunt Eller.

In May 2022, the production reopened at the Young Vic in London for a seven-week limited run, starring Arthur Darvill as Curly and Anoushka Lucas as Laurey, with Marisha Wallace as Ado Annie, Liza Sadovy as Aunt Eller, and James Davis and Patrick Vaill reprising their roles as Will Parker and Jud, respectively. The production transferred to the West End's Wyndham's Theatre in February 2023. It received positive reviews and won the 2023 Laurence Olivier Award for Best Musical Revival.

=== Other noteworthy productions ===
==== Discoveryland ====
Oklahoma! was presented nightly except Sundays each summer at the Discoveryland amphitheater, an outdoor theatre in Sand Springs, Oklahoma, from 1977 until 2011. In 1993, Mary Rodgers (daughter of Richard Rodgers) and William Hammerstein (son of Oscar Hammerstein II) designated Discoveryland the "National Home of Rodgers and Hammerstein's Oklahoma!"

==== 2006 Japan ====
In 2006, Oklahoma! was performed in Japan by the all-female Takarazuka Revue. This revival starred Yuu Todoroki, Ai Shirosaki, and Hiromu Kiriya.

==== 2009 Chichester Theatre Festival ====
In the summer of 2009, British director John Doyle directed the musical at the Chichester Festival Theatre. The production was dark in concept and featured new orchestrations by Jonathan Tunick. On a spare stage, decorated only with blue sheets, "Confetti of rose petals stains the floor like drops of blood, and a nightmarish dream-dance sequence has Freudian overtones as Laurey's bridal gown becomes her shroud." It received mixed reviews. The Times reviewer wrote: "This is a very stylised, overdrilled production, no friend of intimate moments or quiet depth of emotion." The Guardian liked it the most, stating that "it's a delight, with one brilliant tippy-tappy-toed song after another and a nugget of darkness lodged in its sweet heart." Whats On Stage, like most of the papers, gave the show three out of five stars and wrote that this is a "downbeat vision" and that "all told it's a somewhat disappointing show", but their "average reader rating" was four stars. A review in The Telegraph commented, "Doyle uses shadow and silhouette to bring out the musical's nightmarish aspects but doesn't over-labour them. There are enough sunny spots – no more so than in Act 2's rousing title song – to keep the tone evenly textured."

==== 2010 UK tour ====
The show toured England for nine months in 2010 in a new staging by Julian Woolford, with Marti Webb as Aunt Eller and Mark Evans as Curly.

==== 2010 Washington, DC Arena Stage ====
Oklahoma! opened in October 2010 at the Arena Stage to critical acclaim. Artistic Director Molly Smith cast African-American actresses as Laurey and Aunt Eller to mirror both modern Washington, D.C., demographics and the diverse population of the musical's 1906 Oklahoma territory setting. The production received ten 2011 Helen Hayes Award nominations, winning as Outstanding Resident Musical (tying with Shakespeare Theatre's Candide) and for choreography (Parker Esse), lead actor (Nicholas Rodriguez as Curly) and musical direction (George Fulginiti-Shakar). The production returned to the Arena Stage for a second run in 2011.

==== 2012, Seattle, Washington, 5th Avenue Theatre ====
The 5th Avenue Theatre's 2012 production, directed by Peter Rothstein, included African-American dancers and an African-American actor as Jud. The choice was intended, as in the Arena Stage production, to reflect the historical presence of African Americans in the Oklahoma territory, but it "has some audience members squirming in their seats ... they're seeing on stage one of the ugliest stereotypes in our history: an imposing black man ravaging a petite white woman [and] the white hero ... all but urges Jud to hang himself – and even pantomimes the act. Some see a clear reference to lynching." The "Dream Ballet" had a sinister, sexual tone and ended with Jud dragging Laurey away to be raped. One critic noted the historical "license taken when an African-American farmhand is allowed to escort a white woman to the box dance. ... Maybe some people ... left with not so much a song in their head, but a question in their heart. And isn't that part of what theater is supposed to do?" Another wrote: "Rothstein's Oklahoma! is now the story of a crazy, sex obsessed black man ... lusting violently after his white mistress, who ends up murdered at the hands of a white man, who gets off scot free after a mock trial."

==== 2015 UK tour ====
A UK tour ran from February to August 2015, directed by Rachel Kavanaugh and starring Ashley Day as Curly, Charlotte Wakefield as Laurey, Belinda Lang as Aunt Eller and Gary Wilmot as Ali Hakim.

==== Concerts ====
On 26 March 1968 the New York Philharmonic presented a 55-minute concert version prepared by William Hammerstein, for the benefit of the orchestra’s Pension Fund. Skitch Henderson enlarged the Robert Russell Bennett orchestrations for the full Philharmonic and also conducted the (abbreviated) first act; Rodgers guest-led the second. The 2600 seats at Philharmonic Hall were filled, and Constance Towers and John Davidson took the principal roles. Margaret Hamilton was Aunt Eller, Anita Gilette was Ado Annie, and Howard Da Silva reprised Jud.

A concert on January 12, 2026, at Carnegie Hall in New York City, with the Orchestra of St. Luke's was conducted by Rob Berman using the Bennett orchestrations. Shuler Hensley directed, with Emmett O'Hanlon as Curly, Micaela Diamond as Laurey, Jasmine Amy Rogers as Ado Annie, Andrew Durand as Will, Ana Gasteyer as Aunt Eller, Jonathan Christopher as Jud, Parvesh Cheena as Ali Hakim and David Hyde Pierce as Andrew Carnes.

=== 1955 film adaptation ===
The 1955 film adaptation starred Gordon MacRae, Shirley Jones (in her film debut), Rod Steiger, Charlotte Greenwood, Gloria Grahame, Gene Nelson, James Whitmore and Eddie Albert. It was the only musical film directed by Fred Zinnemann, and Agnes de Mille choreographed. It was the first feature film photographed in the Todd-AO 70 mm widescreen process.

Rodgers and Hammerstein personally oversaw the film to prevent the studio from making the changes that were then typical of stage-to-film musical adaptations, such as interpolating new songs by others. The film followed the stage version more closely than any other Rodgers and Hammerstein stage-to-film adaptation, although it divided the long first scene into several shorter scenes, changing the locations of several of the songs. For example, "Kansas City" is performed at the train station, where Aunt Eller and other cowboys meet Will Parker just after he returns from Kansas City. Lyrics in the song about a burlesque stripteaser were slightly changed to pass film censorship. In a nod to Green Grow the Lilacs, which was the basis of the musical, Jud attempts revenge on Curly and Laurey by burning a haystack they stand on, before Curly jumps down, landing on Jud and causing him to fall on his own knife. The film omits only "It's a Scandal, It's a Outrage" and "Lonely Room". The film won Academy Awards for Best Music, Scoring of a Musical Picture and Best Sound, Recording.

== Recordings ==
Bing Crosby and Frank Sinatra both recorded versions of "People Will Say We're In Love" and "Oh, What a Beautiful Mornin'" in 1943. Due to the 1942–1944 musicians' strike, however, these recordings featured no instrumental accompaniment and instead "were lugubriously weighed down by a cappella backup." Producers of Oklahoma! lamented the lack of high-quality official recordings, with Theresa Helburn writing to a colleague in August 1943: "There are no records of Oklahoma! that we can send you. As you know, the Petrillo ban on the union musicians still holds. They cannot play for broadcasting so the only record that has been made is a singing of "People Will Say We're in Love" with Frank Sinatra, which if it sounds anything like his radio singing of the same must be terrible." Decca Records president Jack Kapp settled with the union in September 1943, and three weeks later he hastily booked the original cast and orchestra of Oklahoma! into a recording studio.

At a time when Broadway numbers were typically recorded by popular singers with smaller bands, it was unique for Oklahoma! to record its original cast with full orchestration. Although some tunes were not included due to time and cost constraints, most of the songs from Oklahoma! were released on a record album by Decca Records in 1943 containing six 10-inch double-sided discs in 78 RPM format. It sold more than one million copies, prompting the label to call the cast back into the studio to record three additional selections that had been left out of the first set. These were issued as Oklahoma! Volume Two. In 1949, Decca re-released the first set on LP but not the second set, which soon became a very rare collector's item. All subsequent LP releases were similarly incomplete. Finally in 2000, Decca Broadway went back to the original glass masters to generate a new high fidelity transfer of the complete song program and released it on CD, utilizing the original 78 album artwork.

The success of the original Oklahoma! cast album set a precedent for the production of original cast recordings of Broadway musicals, which became an essential part of a musical's dissemination and endurance in popular culture. Later cast recordings of Oklahoma! include the 1979 Broadway cast recording, the 1980 London cast recording, the 1998 Royal National Theatre cast recording, the 2019 Broadway cast recording, and a soundtrack album of the 1955 film. There have also been more than 20 studio cast recordings of the show, featuring stars such as Nelson Eddy, John Raitt and Florence Henderson in the leading roles.

== Reception ==
The original production of Oklahoma! was an unprecedented critical and commercial success. John Anderson of the New York Journal American pronounced the musical "a beautiful and delightful show, fresh and imaginative, as enchanting to the eye as Richard Rodgers's music is to the ear. It has, at a rough estimate, practically everything". In the New York Herald Tribune, Howard Barnes wrote, "Songs, dances, and a story have been triumphantly blended. ... The Richard Rodgers score is one of his best, and that is saying plenty. Oscar Hammerstein 2nd has written a dramatically imaginative libretto and a string of catchy lyrics; Agnes de Mille has worked small miracles in devising original dances to fit the story and the tunes, while Rouben Mamoulian has directed an excellent company with great taste and craftsmanship." Louis Kronenberger of PM opined that "Mr. Hammerstein's lyrics have less crispness and wit than Lorenz Hart's at their best, but the songs in Oklahoma! call for less sophisticated words, and Mr. Hammerstein has found very likeable ones."

In the New York Daily News, Burns Mantle declared that "Oklahoma! really is different – beautifully different. With the songs that Richard Rodgers has fitted to a collection of unusually atmospheric and intelligible lyrics by Oscar Hammerstein 2nd, Oklahoma! seems to me to be the most thoroughly and attractively American musical comedy since Edna Ferber's Show Boat". New York World-Telegram critic Burton Rascoe particularly emphasized the groundbreaking choreography, stating that "Richard Rodgers has written for the show one of the finest musical scores any musical play ever had. Next to Mr. Rodgers, however, must stand the amazing Agnes de Mille, whose choreography, carried out to perfection by her ballet [corps], is actually the biggest hit of the show. The "Out of My Dreams" and "All Er Nuthin'" dances are such supreme aesthetic delights. ... They are spinetingling, out of this world." In The New York Sun, Ward Morehouse commented that "Oklahoma! is charming and leisurely. And tunely. And certainly not topical," as other shows had been in the early years of World War II. "It reveals Mr. Rodgers, shorn only for the moment of Larry Hart, in good form indeed. And nobody in last night's audience seemed to have a better time than Mr. Hart himself, who applauded the proceedings from a seat in Row B." Lorenz Hart himself "pushed his way through the crowd at the after-show party in Sardi's restaurant and threw his arms around his ex-partner, grinning from ear to ear. He told Rodgers he had never had a better evening at the theater in his life."

The only negative review of the musical appeared in the New York Post: The critic wrote that "it all seemed just a trifle too cute", stating that the score consisted of "a flock of Mr. Rodgers's songs that are pleasant enough, but still manage to sound quite a bit alike ... without much variety in the presentation." She concluded that the show was "very picturesque in a studied fashion, reminding us that life on a farm is apt to become a little tiresome."

== Antecedents and influence ==
According to playwright and theatre writer Thomas Hischak, "Not only is Oklahoma! the most important of the Rodgers and Hammerstein musicals, it is also the single most influential work in the American musical theatre. ... It is the first fully integrated musical play and its blending of song, character, plot and even dance would serve as the model for Broadway shows for decades." William Zinsser observed that Oklahoma! broke the old "musical comedy conventions", with the songs "delving into character" and advancing the plot. The show "became a milestone, so that later historians writing about important moments in twentieth-century theatre would begin to identify eras according to their relationship to Oklahoma!" Oklahoma! made Rodgers and Hammerstein "the most important contributors to the musical-play form. ... The examples they set in creating vital plays, often rich with social thought, provided the necessary encouragement for other gifted writers to create musical plays of their own".

Theater historian Ethan Mordden points out that, although Oklahoma! has been called "the first integrated musical, the first American folk musical", Show Boat "got there first on both counts." Even earlier, the Princess Theatre musicals, following Gilbert and Sullivan and French opéra bouffe, began the reintegration of song and story after decades of thinly plotted British and American musicals, paving the way for Show Boat and Oklahoma! by showing that a musical could combine popular entertainment with continuity between its story and songs. These Princess Theatre shows, which featured modern American settings, "built and polished the mold from which almost all later major musical comedies evolved. ... The characters and situations were, within the limitations of musical comedy license, believable and the humor came from the situations or the nature of the characters. Kern's exquisitely flowing melodies were employed to further the action or develop characterization." Mordden also notes that Oklahoma! was called the first great dance musical, but other musicals had earlier focused on dance, among them Gay Divorce and On Your Toes. He concludes: "But Oklahoma! was the first American musical with an ethnic sound, words and music entirely in the folk idiom."

Critic Andrea Most argues that the musical reflected its author's and composer's Jewish heritage and desires for Jewish Americans. Most asserts that the musical was written at a time when America presented Jews with an opportunity to gain privileged status by assimilating into mainstream American culture and passing as white Americans. Most claims that although there were rarely any identifiably Jewish characters in plays of this time period, characters such as Ali and Jud allowed for subtle Jewish representation, Ali embodying an accepted and friendly ideal for Jewish-Americans and Jud embodying Jewish-Americans' fear of becoming a marginalized minority like black Americans. CBS News included the title song in its 2026 list of the 250 essential American songs of the past 250 years.

== Awards and nominations ==
=== Original Broadway production ===
Year	Award ceremony	Category	Nominee	Result
1944	Pulitzer Prize	Pulitzer Prize Special Awards and Citations	Richard Rodgers and Oscar Hammerstein II	Won
1947	Theatre World Award		Dorothea Macfarland	Won
1993	Tony Award	Special Tony Award (50th anniversary)		Won

=== 1979 Broadway revival ===
Year	Award ceremony	Category	Nominee	Result
1980	Tony Award	Best Performance by a Leading Actress in a Musical	Christine Andreas	Nominated
1980	Tony Award	Best Performance by a Featured Actor in a Musical	Harry Groener	Nominated
1980	Drama Desk Award	Outstanding Featured Actor in a Musical	Martin Vidnovic	Nominated
1980	Drama Desk Award	Outstanding Featured Actor in a Musical	Harry Groener	Nominated
1980	Theatre World Award		Harry Groener	Won

=== 1980 West End revival ===
Year	Award ceremony	Category	Nominee	Result
1980	Laurence Olivier Award	Actor of the Year in a Musical	John Diedrich	Nominated
1980	Laurence Olivier Award	Most Promising Newcomer of the Year in Theatre	Alfred Molina	Nominated

=== 1998 West End revival ===
Year	Award ceremony	Category	Nominee	Result
1998	Critics' Circle Theatre Award	Best Musical		Won
1999	Laurence Olivier Award	Outstanding Musical Production		Won
1999	Laurence Olivier Award	Best Actor in a Musical	Hugh Jackman	Nominated
1999	Laurence Olivier Award	Best Actress in a Musical	Josefina Gabrielle	Nominated
1999	Laurence Olivier Award	Best Supporting Performance in a Musical	Jimmy Johnston	Nominated
1999	Laurence Olivier Award	Best Supporting Performance in a Musical	Shuler Hensley	Won
1999	Laurence Olivier Award	Best Director	Trevor Nunn	Nominated
1999	Laurence Olivier Award	Best Theatre Choreographer	Susan Stroman	Won
1999	Laurence Olivier Award	Best Set Designer	Anthony Ward	Won
1999	Laurence Olivier Award	Best Lighting Designer	David Hersey	Nominated

=== 2002 Broadway revival ===
Year	Award ceremony	Category	Nominee	Result
2002	Tony Award	Best Revival of a Musical		Nominated
2002	Tony Award	Best Performance by a Leading Actor in a Musical	Patrick Wilson	Nominated
2002	Tony Award	Best Performance by a Featured Actor in a Musical	Shuler Hensley	Won
2002	Tony Award	Best Performance by a Featured Actress in a Musical	Andrea Martin	Nominated
2002	Tony Award	Best Direction of a Musical	Trevor Nunn	Nominated
2002	Tony Award	Best Choreography	Susan Stroman	Nominated
2002	Tony Award	Best Lighting Design	David Hersey	Nominated
2002	Drama Desk Award	Outstanding Revival of a Musical		Nominated
2002	Drama Desk Award	Outstanding Actor in a Musical	Patrick Wilson	Nominated
2002	Drama Desk Award	Outstanding Featured Actor in a Musical	Shuler Hensley	Won
2002	Drama Desk Award	Outstanding Featured Actor in a Musical	Justin Bohon	Nominated
2002	Drama Desk Award	Outstanding Featured Actress in a Musical	Andrea Martin	Nominated
2002	Drama Desk Award	Outstanding Director of a Musical	Trevor Nunn	Nominated
2002	Drama Desk Award	Outstanding Choreography	Susan Stroman	Won
2002	Drama Desk Award	Outstanding Set Design	Anthony Ward	Nominated
2002	Drama Desk Award	Outstanding Lighting Design	David Hersey	Nominated
2002	Theatre World Award		Justin Bohon	Won

=== 2019 Broadway revival ===
Year	Award ceremony	Category	Nominee	Result
2019	Tony Award	Best Revival of a Musical		Won
2019	Tony Award	Best Performance by a Leading Actor in a Musical	Damon Daunno	Nominated
2019	Tony Award	Best Performance by a Featured Actress in a Musical	Ali Stroker	Won
2019	Tony Award	Best Performance by a Featured Actress in a Musical	Mary Testa	Nominated
2019	Tony Award	Best Direction of a Musical	Daniel Fish	Nominated
2019	Tony Award	Best Scenic Design in a Musical	Laura Jellinek	Nominated
2019	Tony Award	Best Sound Design of a Musical	Drew Levy	Nominated
2019	Tony Award	Best Orchestrations	Daniel Kluger	Nominated
2019	Drama Desk Award	Outstanding Revival of a Musical		Nominated
2019	Drama Desk Award	Outstanding Actor in a Musical	Damon Daunno	Nominated
2019	Drama Desk Award	Outstanding Actress in a Musical	Rebecca Naomi Jones	Nominated
2019	Drama Desk Award	Outstanding Featured Actor in a Musical	Patrick Vaill	Nominated
2019	Drama Desk Award	Outstanding Featured Actress in a Musical	Ali Stroker	Won
2019	Drama Desk Award	Outstanding Featured Actress in a Musical	Mary Testa	Nominated
2019	Drama Desk Award	Outstanding Director of a Musical	Daniel Fish	Nominated
2019	Drama Desk Award	Outstanding Scenic Design of a Musical	Laura Jellinek	Nominated
2019	Drama Desk Award	Outstanding Lighting Design for a Musical	Scott Zielinski	Nominated
2019	Drama Desk Award	Outstanding Sound Design in a Musical	Drew Levy	Nominated
2019	Drama Desk Award	Outstanding Orchestrations	Daniel Kluger	Won
2019	Drama Desk Award	Outstanding Projection Design	Joshua Thorson	Nominated
2019	Drama League Award	Outstanding Revival of a Musical		Nominated
2019	Drama League Award	Distinguished Performance	Ali Stroker	Nominated
2019	Outer Critics Circle Award	Outstanding Revival of a Musical		Nominated
2019	Outer Critics Circle Award	Outstanding Actor in a Musical	Damon Daunno	Nominated
2019	Outer Critics Circle Award	Outstanding Featured Actress in a Musical	Ali Stroker	Nominated
2019	Outer Critics Circle Award	Outstanding Director of a Musical	Daniel Fish	Nominated
2019	Outer Critics Circle Award	Outstanding Orchestrations	Daniel Kluger	Won
2019	Outer Critics Circle Award	Outstanding Sound Design	Drew Levy	Nominated
2020	Grammy Award	Best Musical Theater Album	Damon Daunno, Rebecca Naomi Jones, Ali Stroker, Mary Testa & Patrick Vaill (principal soloists); Daniel Kluger & Dean Sharenow (producers); Richard Rodgers (composer); Oscar Hammerstein II (lyricist)	Nominated

=== 2023 West End revival ===
Year	Award ceremony	Category	Nominee	Result
2023	Laurence Olivier Award	Best Musical Revival		Won
2023	Laurence Olivier Award	Best Actor in a Musical	Arthur Darvill	Won
2023	Laurence Olivier Award	Best Actress in a Musical	Anoushka Lucas	Nominated
2023	Laurence Olivier Award	Best Actress in a Supporting Role in a Musical	Liza Sadovy	Nominated
2023	Laurence Olivier Award	Best Actress in a Supporting Role in a Musical	Marisha Wallace	Nominated
2023	Laurence Olivier Award	Best Sound Design	Drew Levy	Nominated
2023	Laurence Olivier Award	Best Original Score or New Orchestrations	Daniel Kluger	Nominated

== In popular culture ==
Oklahoma! has frequently been quoted or parodied in films, television and other media. The following list includes some of the more noteworthy references.

Films

- In the film When Harry Met Sally... (1989), Harry and Sally sing a karaoke version of "Surrey With the Fringe on Top".
- In Dave (1993), the title character sings the song "Oklahoma!"
- In Twister (1996), Beltzer and Haynes sing the song "Oklahoma!"
- In I Can Only Imagine (2018), Bart Millard performs "Oklahoma!" for his school play.
- The songs "Oh What a Beautiful Mornin'" and "Oklahoma!" were spoofed in the animated film South Park: Bigger, Longer & Uncut (1999). One of the spoofs is the song "Uncle Fucka", which parodies the spelled-out O-K-L-A-H-O-M-A of the musical's title song. A similar spoof is heard in the musical Curtains, concerning the title song of the Oklahoma!-like musical performed within the show.
- I'm Thinking of Ending Things (2020) contains several references to Oklahoma! and a performance of the song "Lonely Room".
- In Highest 2 Lowest (2025), Norm Lewis sings "Oh What a Beautiful Mornin'" during the opening credits.
- In Blue Moon (2025), the opening night of "Oklahoma!" serves as the film's framing event, including Hart's evening at Sardi's.

Television

- In the 1975 Fawlty Towers episode "Gourmet Night", Polly sings "I Cain't Say No".
- In the The Simpsons episode "Milhouse of Sand and Fog", the character Milhouse imagines himself and Bart singing "The Farmer and the Cowman". Another episode, "I'm Just a Girl Who Can't Say D'oh", begins with Llewellyn Sinclair directing a production of Oklahoma! with Marge as Ado Annie. Llewellyn is frustrated every time Marge tells him "no", since Ado Annie "cain't say no".
- Sesame Street featured Kermit the Frog directing the film "Oklahoma"; Forgetful Jones sing the title song imperfectly. In 1977, Ray Charles performed "Oh, What a Beautiful Mornin'" on the show, while Oscar the grouch sings "Oh what a rotten old morning...". On episode 317 of The Muppet Show, Fozzie Bear, dressed as a cowboy, begins to sing "Oklahoma", but large Muppets dressed as Samurai warriors parody the number.
- Tiny Toon Adventures spoofed the musical as "Ducklahoma", which heavily featured anvils.
- In an episode of 3rd Rock from the Sun, "Frozen Dick", Dick sings a rendition of "Oklahoma!" in a diner; the patrons in the diner sing along with him.
- In episode 9 of Band of Brothers, "Why We Fight" (2001), several soldiers sing the show's title song.
- The Watchmen series, set in Tulsa, frequently references the musical in its score and character names, and integrates its themes and plot points in the episodes, including a fully-staged performance of the title song.
- In the Euphoria episode "Ruminations: Big and Little Bullys", Lexi writes a play to compete with the school's production of Oklahoma!; Cassie's attempt to dress fashionably is mistaken as an audition outfit.

Other media

- On April 4, 1944, comedian Fred Allen performed a parody of "Oklahoma!" on his CBS radio show. In Allen's version "Oklahoma!" became "North Dakota", "Oh, What A Beautiful Morning" became "Oh, What a Miserable Morning", and "Surrey With the Fringe on Top" became "Union Suit with the Hinge on the Back".
- The title song became the official state song of Oklahoma in 1953. (Oklahoma became a state on November 16, 1907.)
- In Truman Capote's 1958 novella Breakfast at Tiffany's, Holly Golightly sings music from Oklahoma! while accompanying herself on her guitar.
