= The Farmer and the Cowman =

Song from the musical Oklahoma!

Song
- Published: 1943
- Composer: Richard Rodgers
- Lyricist: Oscar Hammerstein II

"The Farmer and the Cowman" is a song composed by Richard Rodgers and with lyrics by Oscar Hammerstein II for their 1943 musical Oklahoma! It is sung primarily by Andrew Carnes, Aunt Eller, and Ike Skidmore. In various versions of Oklahoma!, the singing parts for Ike, Andrew, and Aunt Eller have been swapped. Lines for Will Parker, Ado Annie, and Curly McLain are also included. Repetition of the refrain is sung by the entire company.

This song is included in the first scene of the second act of Oklahoma!. It is accompanied by an elaborate dancing sequence. This number, and the scene itself, takes place at the Skidmore Ranch, where the box social follows after the song.

In contrast to the rest of the musical, "The Farmer and the Cowman" does not further the plot but does allow the audience to witness the tension between the farmers and the cowmen, a tension that comes from the farmers' desire to protect their crops with fences while the cowmen prefer the freedom to move cattle over a wide open range. Carnes, Aunt Eller and Ike act as peacemakers and attempt to reconcile the two sides. The song appears to have no effect, and the two sides start fighting. Aunt Eller then shoots a gun in the air to stop the fighting, and conducts both groups – preaching peace with the lyrics of the song, but threatening violence.

At the end of the song, however, there is a resolution. Both sides agree to act hospitably toward each other after receiving a bit of advice from Aunt Eller:

I don't say I'm no better than anybody else,
But I'll be danged if I ain't just as good!

The song resolves a minor subplot, although the conflict between Jud and Curly (a farmer and a cowman) has yet to be resolved at that point.

== In other uses ==
Jules David Prown used the farmer and cowman conceit as a title and classification device in his article "Can the Farmer and the Cowman Still be Friends?"
