= The Surrey with the Fringe on Top =

Song
- Published: 1943
- Genre: Showtune
- Composer: Richard Rodgers
- Lyricist: Oscar Hammerstein II

"The Surrey with the Fringe on Top" is a show tune from the 1943 Rodgers and Hammerstein musical Oklahoma!.

== Background ==
A surrey is a type of four-wheeled carriage that was popular in the United States at the turn of the 20th century.

== In jazz ==
The piece was recorded in 1952 by jazz pianist Ahmad Jamal, which influenced trumpeter Miles Davis to include it in his repertoire in the 1950s, which probably motivated other jazz musicians to play it.
