= Oklahoma (Rodgers and Hammerstein song) =

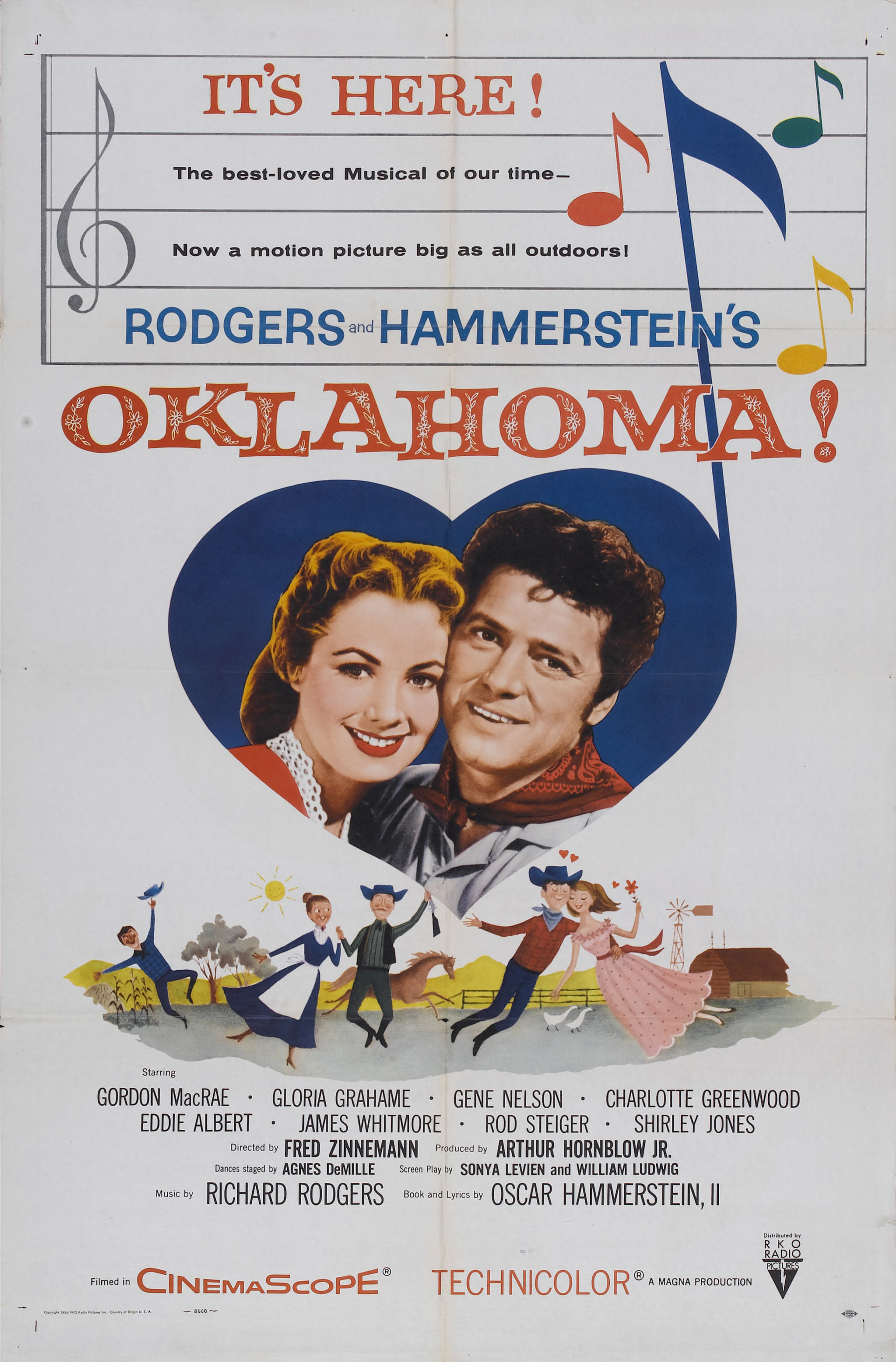

Song
- Published: 1943
- Songwriters: Richard Rodgers, Oscar Hammerstein II

"Oklahoma" is the title song from the 1943 Broadway musical Oklahoma!, named for the setting of the musical play. The music and lyrics were written by Richard Rodgers and Oscar Hammerstein II. The melody is reprised in the main title of the 1955 film version and in the overtures of both film and musical productions.

In 1953, the Oklahoma legislature chose it as the state song of Oklahoma, replacing a less well-known song, "Oklahoma - A Toast", that had been adopted in 1935.

== Rodgers and Hammerstein song ==
Midway through the second act of the play, after the principals Curly and Laurey are married, Curly begins to sing the song and is soon joined by the entire cast as a chorus. The lyric, which briefly depicts the Midwestern twang phonetically, describes the landscape and prairie weather in positive language. It further emphasizes the wholesome aspects of rural life, and the steadfast dedication of the region's inhabitants, against the overtly stated formal backdrop of the territory's impending admission to the Union in 1907.

Hammerstein's lyric is also notable and memorable for its trochaic re-iteration of its title as a chant, and the final iambic eight-letter spelling of the title as a play on the colloquial English word "Okay". Orchestrator Robert Russell Bennett's massive 8-part chorale near the end of the song extends it to include a spelling of the name, ending with an epic ritardando leading into one last iteration of "Oklahoma."

The state of Oklahoma adopted the song as its state song in 1953. It is the only state song from a Broadway musical. State Representative George Nigh, who later served as the state's governor, was the principal author of the legislation.

It also serves as one of the key songs of the University of Oklahoma, where it is in the repertoire played hourly from the bell tower on campus. The song is also played by the Pride of Oklahoma at Oklahoma Sooners athletic events and other campus events. The song is also used by Oklahoma's other major public university, Oklahoma State University, and their Cowboy Marching Band.

== Previous state song ==
"Oklahoma" replaced the first state song, "Oklahoma - A Toast", written in 1905 by Mrs. Harriett Parker Camden of Kingfisher, Oklahoma. It became a hit within the state, and was adopted as the state song by the legislature on March 26, 1935. The lyrics of the refrain are:

"I give you a land of sun and flowers, and summer a whole year long, I give you a land where the golden hours roll by to the mockingbird's song, Where the cotton blooms 'neath the southern sun, where the vintage hangs thick on the vine. A land whose story has just begun. This wonderful land of mine."

== Award ==
Members of the Western Writers of America chose "Oklahoma" as one of the Top 100 Western songs of all time.
