= I Cain't Say No =

Song composed by Richard Rodgers

Song
- Published: 1943
- Songwriter: Oscar Hammerstein II
- Composer: Richard Rodgers

"I Cain't Say No" is a song from the 1943 musical play Oklahoma! written by composer Richard Rodgers and lyricist/librettist Oscar Hammerstein II, initially performed by Celeste Holm.

In the song Ado Annie Carnes describes her sexual awakening (albeit in highly euphemistic terms) and the conflicts that it brings. A less euphemistic set of stanzas, which was in the original, was dropped from the 1955 movie. One of two female leads, Ado Annie has a pair of principal suitors, a Persian traveling salesman Ali Hakim and the cowboy Will Parker, recently returned from an excursion to Kansas City. She describes to her friend Laurey the attention she is now receiving from men since she filled out and her inability to say "no" to their advances.
