= Kind Lady =

Kind Lady is a play by Edward Chodorov. The title may also refer to its two film adaptations:

- Kind Lady (1935 film), starring Aline MacMahon
- Kind Lady (1951 film), featuring Ethel Barrymore
