= Booth Theatre =

Broadway theater in Manhattan, New York

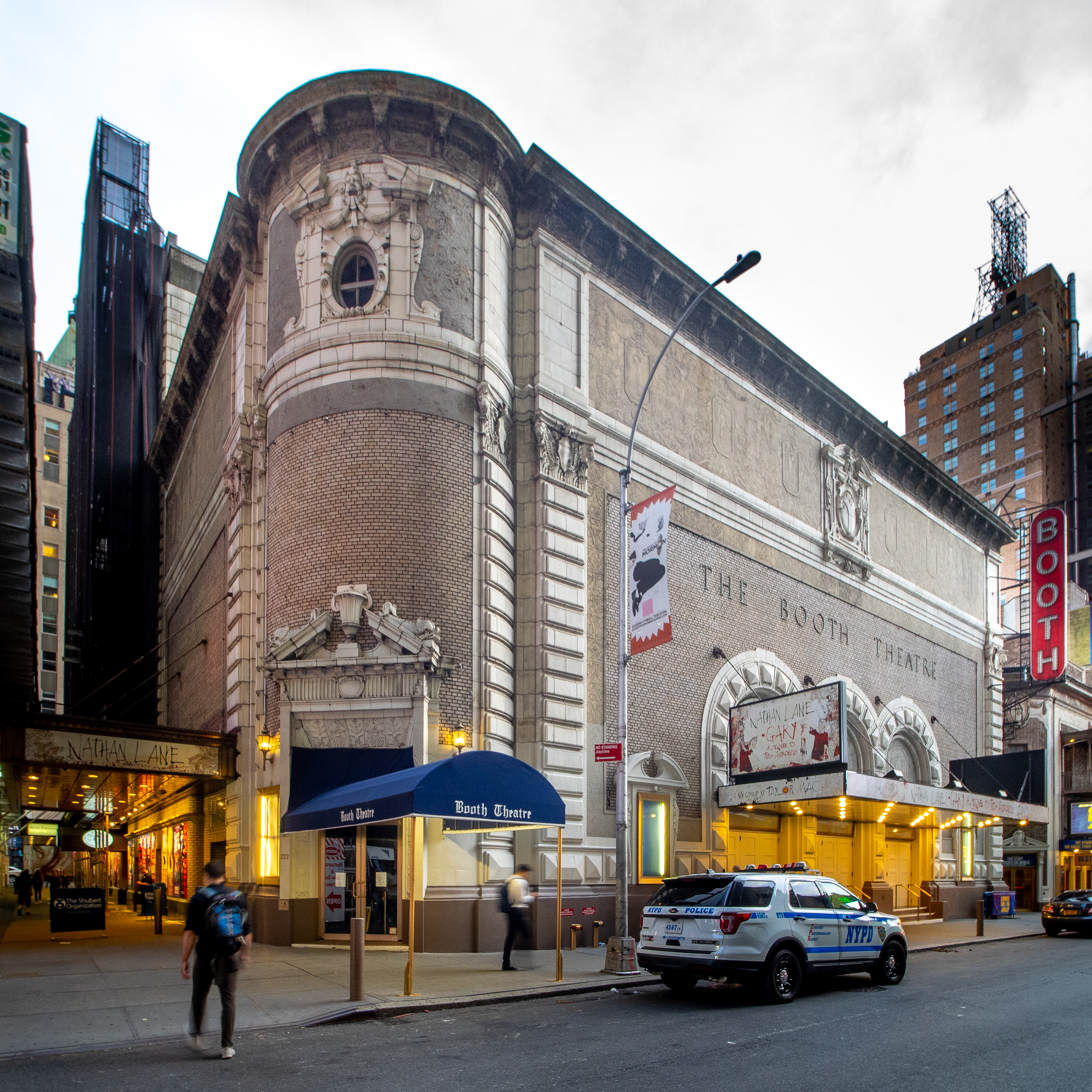
- Interactive map of Booth Theatre
- Address: 222 West 45th Street; Manhattan, New York; United States
- Coordinates: 40°45′30″N 73°59′13″W
- Owner: Shubert and Booth Theatre, LLC
- Operator: The Shubert Organization
- Capacity: 800
- Type: Broadway
- Production: Downstate
- Public transit: Subway: Times Square–42nd Street/Port Authority Bus Terminal

Construction
- Opened: October 16, 1913 (113 years ago)
- Years active: 1913–present
- Architect: Henry Beaumont Herts

Website
- shubert.nyc/theatres/booth/

New York City Landmark
- Designated: November 4, 1987
- Reference no.: 1321
- Designated entity: Facade

New York City Landmark
- Designated: November 4, 1987
- Reference no.: 1322
- Designated entity: Lobby and auditorium interior

The Booth Theatre is a Broadway theater at 222 West 45th Street (George Abbott Way) in the Theater District of Midtown Manhattan in New York City, New York, U.S. Opened in 1913, the theater was designed by Henry Beaumont Herts in the Italian Renaissance style and was built for the Shubert brothers. The venue was originally operated by Winthrop Ames, who named it for 19th-century American actor Edwin Booth. It has 800 seats across two levels and is operated by The Shubert Organization. The facade and parts of the interior are New York City landmarks.

The Booth's facade is made of brick and terracotta, with sgraffito decorations designed in stucco. Three arches face north onto 45th Street, and a curved corner faces east toward Broadway. To the east, the Shubert Alley facade includes doors to the lobby and the stage house. The auditorium contains an orchestra level, one balcony, box seats, and a coved ceiling. The walls are decorated with wooden paneling with windows above, an unusual design for Broadway theaters, and there is an elliptical proscenium arch at the front of the auditorium. The stage house to the south is shared with the Shubert Theatre, and a gift shop occupies some of the former dressing rooms.

The Shubert brothers developed the Booth and Shubert theaters as their first venues on the block. It opened on October 16, 1913, with Arnold Bennett's play The Great Adventure. Ames leased the theater and showed many of his own productions until 1932, when the Shuberts took over. Many of the Booth's initial productions had short runs, particularly in the 1930s, but longer runs began to predominate by the 1940s. Long-running productions have included Luv, Butterflies Are Free, That Championship Season, For Colored Girls Who Have Considered Suicide / When the Rainbow Is Enuf, and The Elephant Man.

== Site ==
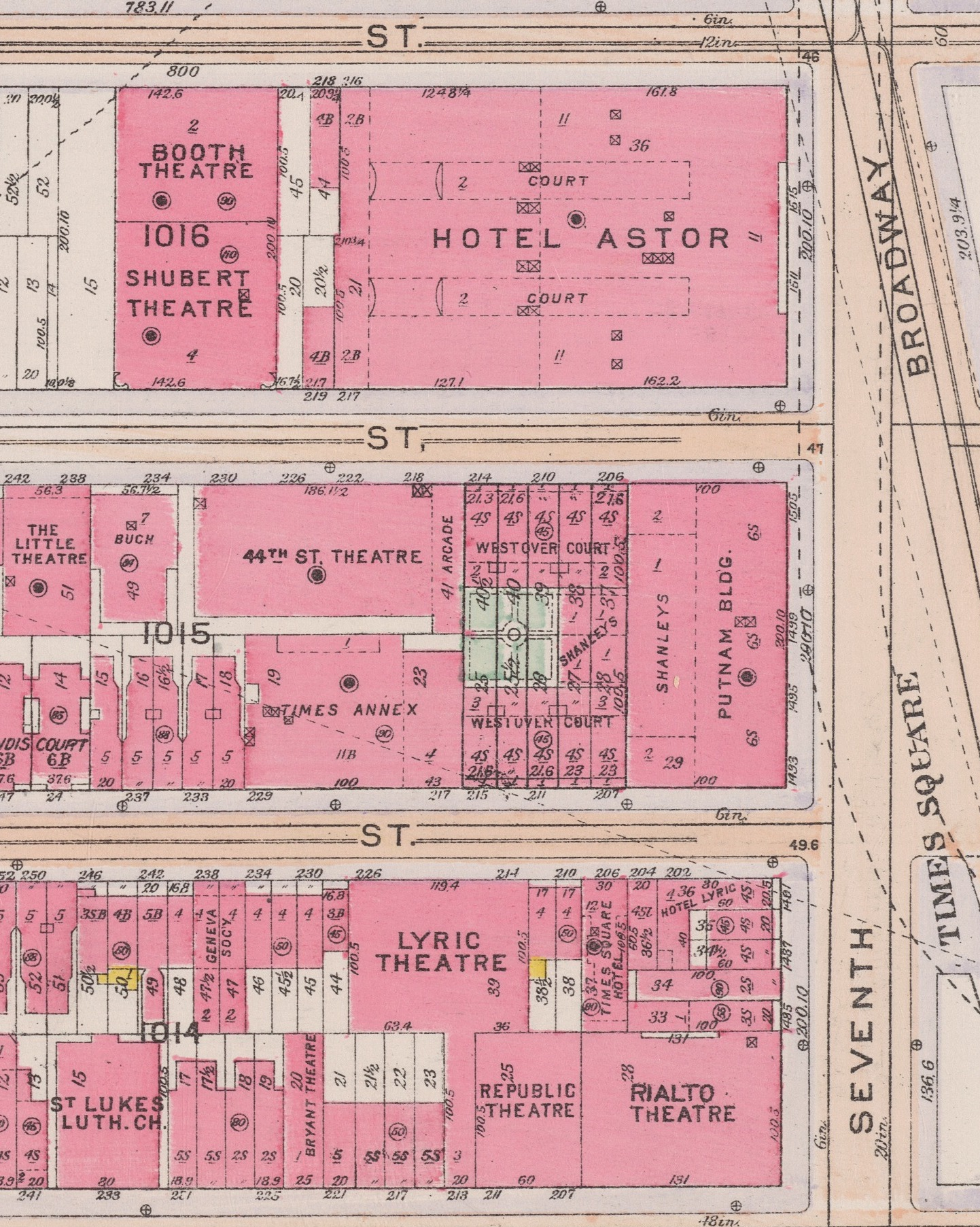
Drawing of the theater's site in 1916. The Shubert and Booth theaters are at upper left.

The Booth Theatre is on 224 West 45th Street, on the north sidewalk between Eighth Avenue and Seventh Avenue, near Times Square in the Theater District of Midtown Manhattan in New York City, New York, U.S. It shares a land lot with the Shubert Theatre directly to the south, though the theaters are separate buildings. The lot covers 25,305 square feet (2,350.9 m^{2}), with a frontage of 126 feet (38 m) on 44th and 45th Streets and 200.83 feet (61 m) on Shubert Alley to the east. The Booth Theatre building takes up 90 feet (27 m) of the Shubert Alley frontage.

The Booth is part of the largest concentration of Broadway theaters on a single block. The adjoining block of 45th Street is also known as George Abbott Way, and foot traffic on the street increases box-office totals for the theaters there. The Booth adjoins six other theaters: the Majestic and Broadhurst to the southwest; the John Golden, Bernard B. Jacobs, and Gerald Schoenfeld to the west; and the Shubert to the south. Other nearby structures include the Row NYC Hotel to the west; the Music Box Theatre, Imperial Theatre, and Richard Rodgers Theatre to the north; One Astor Plaza to the east; 1501 Broadway to the southeast; and the Hayes Theater and St. James Theatre one block south. The Broadhurst, Schoenfeld (originally Plymouth), Booth, and Shubert theaters were all developed by the Shubert brothers between 44th and 45th Streets, occupying land previously owned by the Astor family. The Shuberts bought the land under all four theaters from the Astors in 1948.

The Shubert and Booth theaters were developed as a pair and are the oldest theaters on the block. The site was previously occupied by several houses on 44th and 45th Street. The adjacent Shubert Alley, built along with the Shubert and Booth theaters, was originally a 15-foot-wide (4.6 m) fire escape passage. Shubert Alley's presence not only allowed the theaters to meet fire regulations but also enabled the structures to be designed as corner lots. Originally, the theaters faced the Hotel Astor, now the location of One Astor Plaza, across the alley. Another private alley runs to the west, between the Booth/Shubert and Broadhurst/Schoenfeld theaters. The Broadhurst and Schoenfeld were also built as a pair, occupying land left over from the development of the Shubert and Booth; these too are designed with curved corners facing Broadway.

== Design ==
The Booth Theatre was designed by Henry Beaumont Herts and constructed in 1913 for the Shubert brothers. Herts was an experienced theatrical architect and had previously led the firm of Herts & Tallant, which designed such theaters as the Lyceum, the New Amsterdam, and the Liberty. The Shubert and Booth theaters are within separate buildings and differ in their interior designs and functions, although they have adjacent stage areas near the center of the block. The Shubert was the larger house, intended to be suitable for musicals, and the Shubert family's offices were placed above the auditorium there. By contrast, the Booth was intended to be smaller and more intimate. The Booth Theatre is operated by The Shubert Organization.

=== Facade ===
The facades of the two theaters are similar in arrangement, being designed in an Italian Renaissance style. The structures both have curved corners facing Broadway, since most audience members reached the theaters from that direction. The Booth's facade is made of white brick, laid in English-cross bondwork, as well as terracotta. An early source described the theaters' facades as being made of white marble, with stucco and faience panels. The main section of the theater is topped by a cornice with sheet-metal brackets designed to resemble theatrical masks. A balustrade used to run above the cornice. The western wall is plain and has a fire escape. A critic for Architecture magazine wrote that Herts had "discovered an excellent motive for a single facade", although it "would perhaps have been more amusing" if the two theaters had contained different facades.

According to the New-York Tribune, the theaters' use of hand-carved sgraffito for decoration made Herts "the first man to have used sgraffito for this purpose". The sgraffito was used because of New York City building codes that prevented decorations from projecting beyond their lot lines. These decorations were colored light-gray, placed on a purple-gray background. The sgraffito on the two theaters is one of the few such examples that remain in New York City. A contemporary source said the theaters' facades were "free from much of the gaudy trappings that has made some of the recent playhouses commonplace in appearance".

==== 45th Street ====
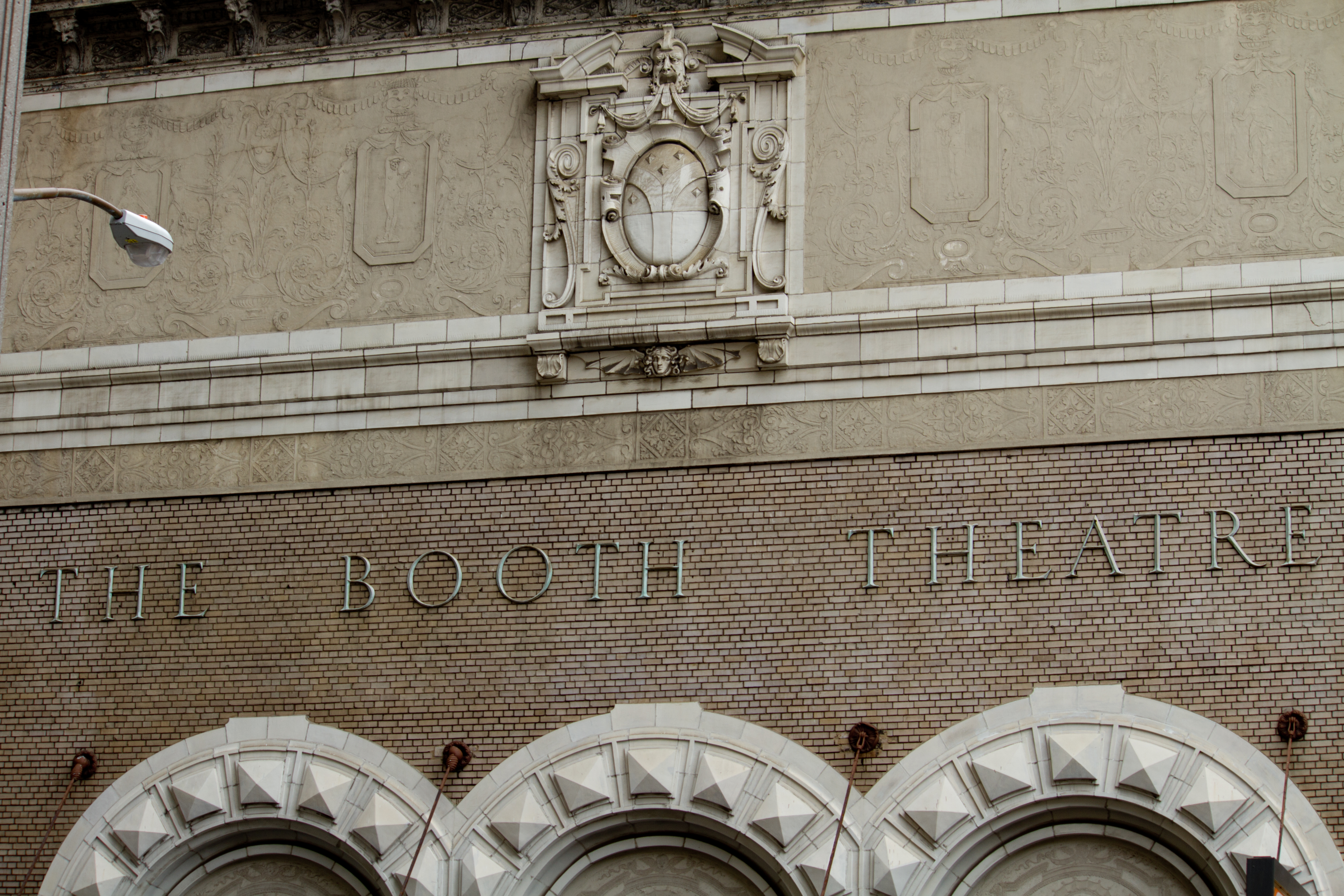
Cartouche above the Booth Theatre's entrance

At ground level, the 45th Street elevation contains a tall water table of painted stone, above which is a band with rusticated blocks of terracotta. There are three arches at the center of the facade, which provide an emergency exit from the lobby. Each archway originally contained a pair of paneled wooden triple doors, but these have since been covered with posters. On either side of the arches are rectangular sign boards topped by broken segmental-arched pediments. Within the archways above the doors are sgraffito paintings, which depict figures. These paintings are partially obscured by a modern marquee that is cantilevered from the wall above. The archways are surrounded by rusticated voussoirs.

Above the archways, the theater's facade is made of brick. The words "The Booth Theatre" are placed above the arches in metal letters. The brick section of the facade is surrounded by a stucco band of sgraffito decorations, which is painted beige and contains bas reliefs of classical-style foliate ornamentation. The extreme left (east) and right (west) ends of the facade contain vertical sequences of terracotta quoins; they have Corinthian-style capitals that are decorated with motifs of griffins and shields. The sgraffito band wraps along the top of the brick wall. Above that is a stucco wall section with sgraffito decorations, which depict grotesques holding swags and human figures holding urns and staffs. These sgraffito decorations alternate with octagonal terracotta panels. At the center of the stucco wall section is a terracotta aedicule with a heraldic cartouche, above which is a broken pediment.

==== Northeast corner ====
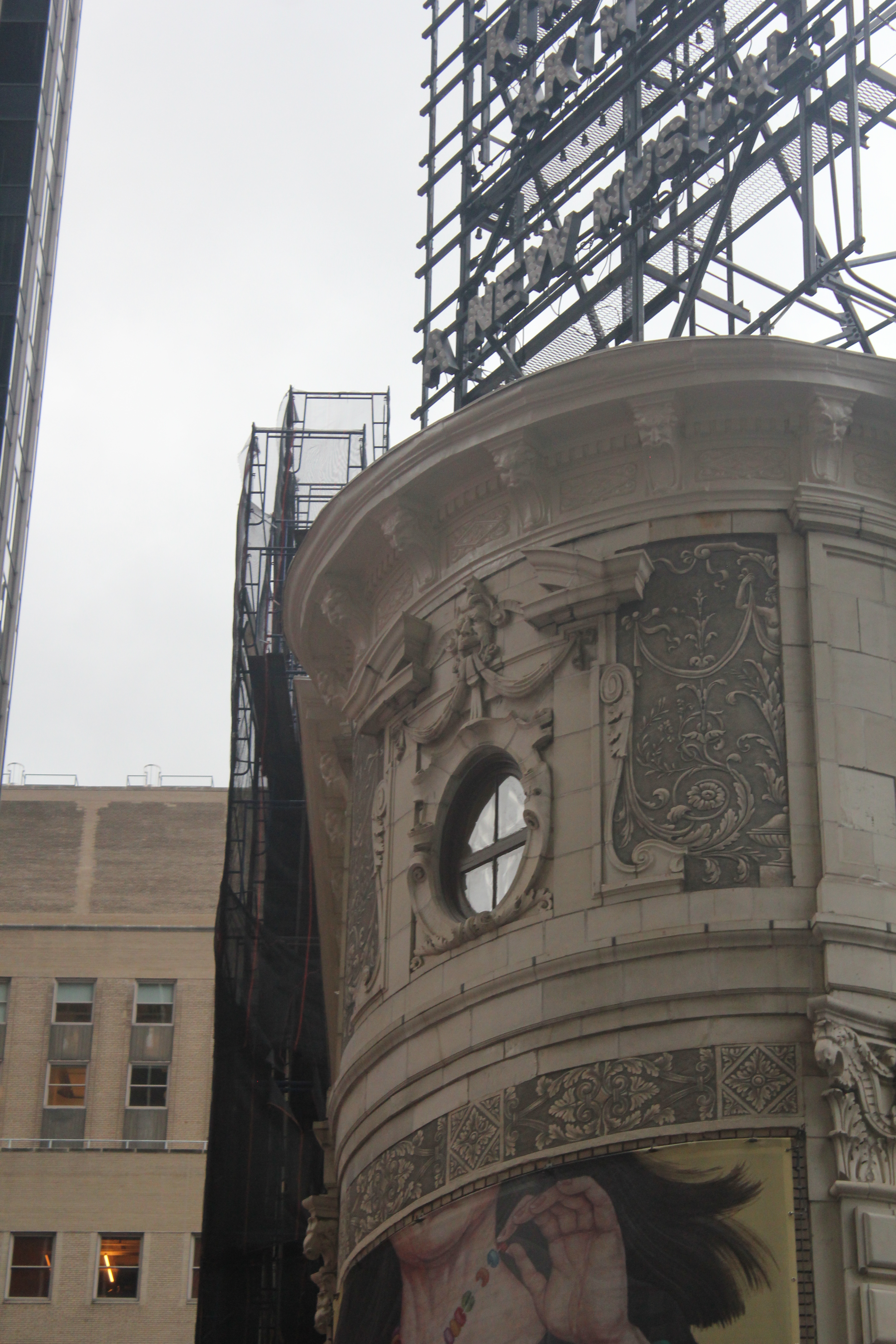
Window atop the Booth Theatre's corner section

Due to the theater's location at the corner of 45th Street and Shubert Alley, the northeast corner of the facade is curved. This corner section has a doorway at the center, containing glass-and-metal doors; these are shielded by a canopy that extends to the curb on 44th Street. A sign board is to the west of the doorway. There are stucco bas-relief panels on either side of the doorway, which contain foliate decorations. Above the doors is an entablature with a fluted panels and a broken pediment shaped like a segmental arch. The center of the broken pediment has an urn, while the sides of the pediment have carvings of dolphins.

A brick wall rises from the doorway. Like on 45th Street, there are vertical quoins with Corinthian capitals on the left and right. At the top of the brick wall, there is a stucco frieze that originally contained sgraffito decorations. There is a window above the frieze, which is flanked by scrolls and console brackets. The window has a broken pediment with swags draped from a theatrical mask in the center. The top of the corner section has a cornice, above which is a metal sign.

==== Shubert Alley ====
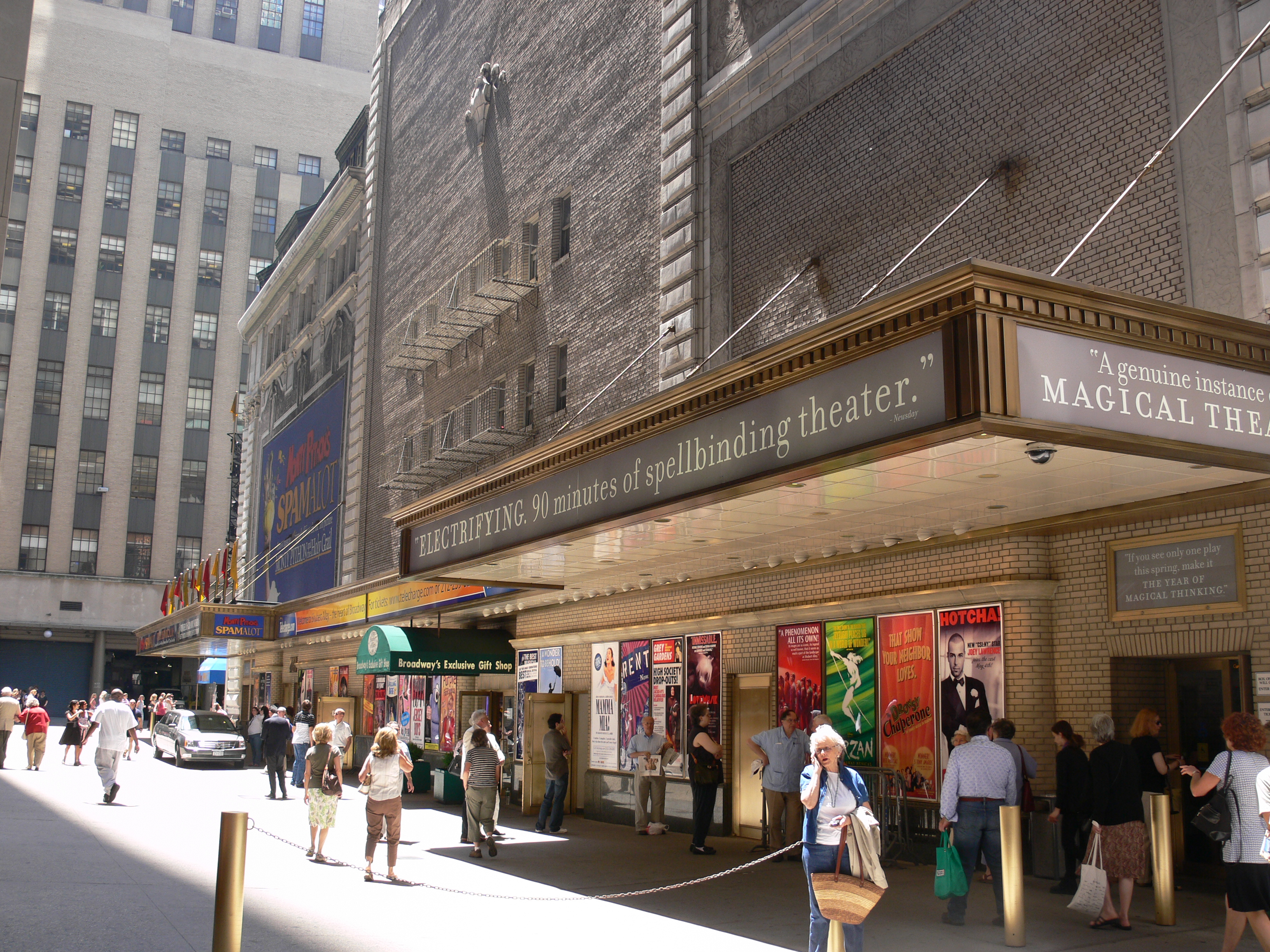
Shubert Alley facade, 2007

On Shubert Alley, the facade is divided into the stage house to the left (south) and the auditorium to the right (north). The auditorium section contains one set of glass-and-metal doors at the far right. Like the elevations on 45th Street and at the northeast corner, the right side of the auditorium facade contains vertical quoins topped by a Corinthian capital. Also similar to the 45th Street elevation, there is a brick wall section above the first floor, surrounded by a stucco sgraffito band with bas-reliefs. At the top of the brick wall is a stucco wall section, containing sgraffito decorations alternating with three octagonal terracotta panels.

The stage house section (shared with the Shubert Theatre) is simpler in design, being made mainly of brick in English cross bond. The ground floor has doorways, metal panels, and sign boards. A band of quoins separates the stage house from the Shubert auditorium to the left and the Booth auditorium to the right. The second to fourth floors have one-over-one sash windows, while the fifth floor has a terracotta shield at the center. The top of the stage house contains a parapet, above which is a sgraffito panel surrounded by bricks. The stage door is within this section.

=== Interior ===
==== Lobby ====
The theater contains both a ticket lobby and a rectangular inner lobby. The use of two lobbies, rather than a single space leading directly to the auditorium, was intended to reduce the air drafts and noise that entered the auditorium. The inner lobby's east wall contains exits with molded doorways, above which are exit signs with cornices. The north wall of the inner lobby contains a niche with a bust of actor Edwin Booth, the theater's namesake. This is a copy of a bust that was installed in the Players Club, where Booth was a member. The west wall contains brass lighting sconces and doors to the auditorium. At the top of the walls is a Doric frieze. The inner lobby contains a coffered ceiling, with chandeliers hanging from each ceiling section.

==== Auditorium ====
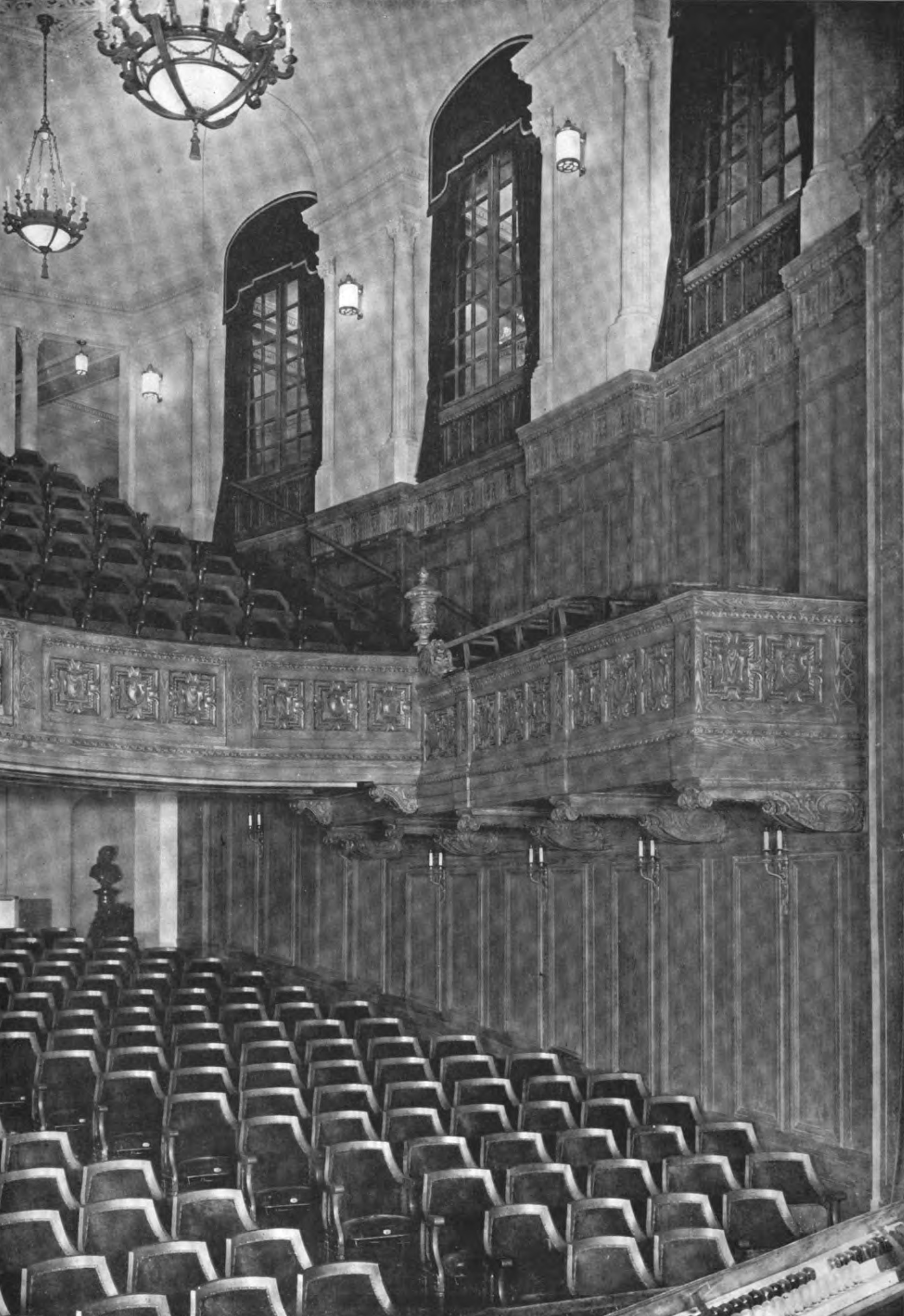
View of the auditorium's left wall from the stage. The walls contain wood paneling that rises to about two-thirds of the auditorium's height. The top third of the balcony walls contains elliptical arches with casement windows. The left boxes and balcony hang over the orchestra.

The auditorium has an orchestra level, one balcony, boxes, and a stage behind the proscenium arch. The auditorium is wider than its depth. According to the Shubert Organization, the theater has 800 seats; meanwhile, The Broadway League gives a figure of 766 seats and Playbill cites 770 seats. The physical seats are divided into 514 seats in the orchestra, 252 on the balcony, and 12 in the boxes. There are 22 standing-only spots, as well as 30 removable seats in the orchestra pit. Originally, the orchestra had 445 seats while the balcony had 223. The theater contains restrooms in the basement and on the orchestra level, as well as water fountains. The orchestra level is wheelchair-accessible, but the balcony is not.

The original decorative scheme was described as being gray and "rich mulberry". The interior was also decorated with Booth memorabilia such as his favorite armchair, as well as posters and playbills of shows in which Booth had appeared. Architecture magazine cited the Booth's interior as being "unusually good in design, tasteful, quiet and charming".

===== Seating areas =====
The orchestra is accessed from doors on the rear, or east. The rear of the orchestra contains a promenade. Paneled piers support the balcony level and separate the promenade from the orchestra seating. The top of the orchestra promenade's walls contain a Doric-style frieze. Brass lanterns hang from the promenade's ceiling. The orchestra level is raked, sloping down toward an orchestra pit in front of the stage. The balcony is also raked, and the rear of the balcony contains a promenade, similar to that on the orchestra. The balcony promenade is demarcated by a frieze on its ceiling, which contains brass-and-crystal chandeliers. Archways, flanked by columns, lead between the balcony promenade and the balcony seating. There is also a technical booth at the rear of the balcony. At the front of the balcony level is a box on either side, supported by brackets. The underside of the balcony contains wood paneling. The front railing of the balcony and boxes contains paneled sections with strapwork patterns; a light box is installed in front of the balcony railing.

The orchestra has paneled wooden side walls, which curve inward toward the stage. The paneled walls at orchestra level continue at balcony level, up to the height of the proscenium arch (about two-thirds of the auditorium's height). Above the paneling is a Doric-style frieze and cornice. At the top of the balcony walls are elliptical arches with casement windows above paneling; there are three such windows on each wall. Between these arches are wall sections, which contain wall sconces flanked by engaged columns. An entablature runs across the wall sections and above the rear of the balcony seating. The use of casement windows above paneled walls is an uncommon design feature among Broadway theaters.

===== Other design features =====
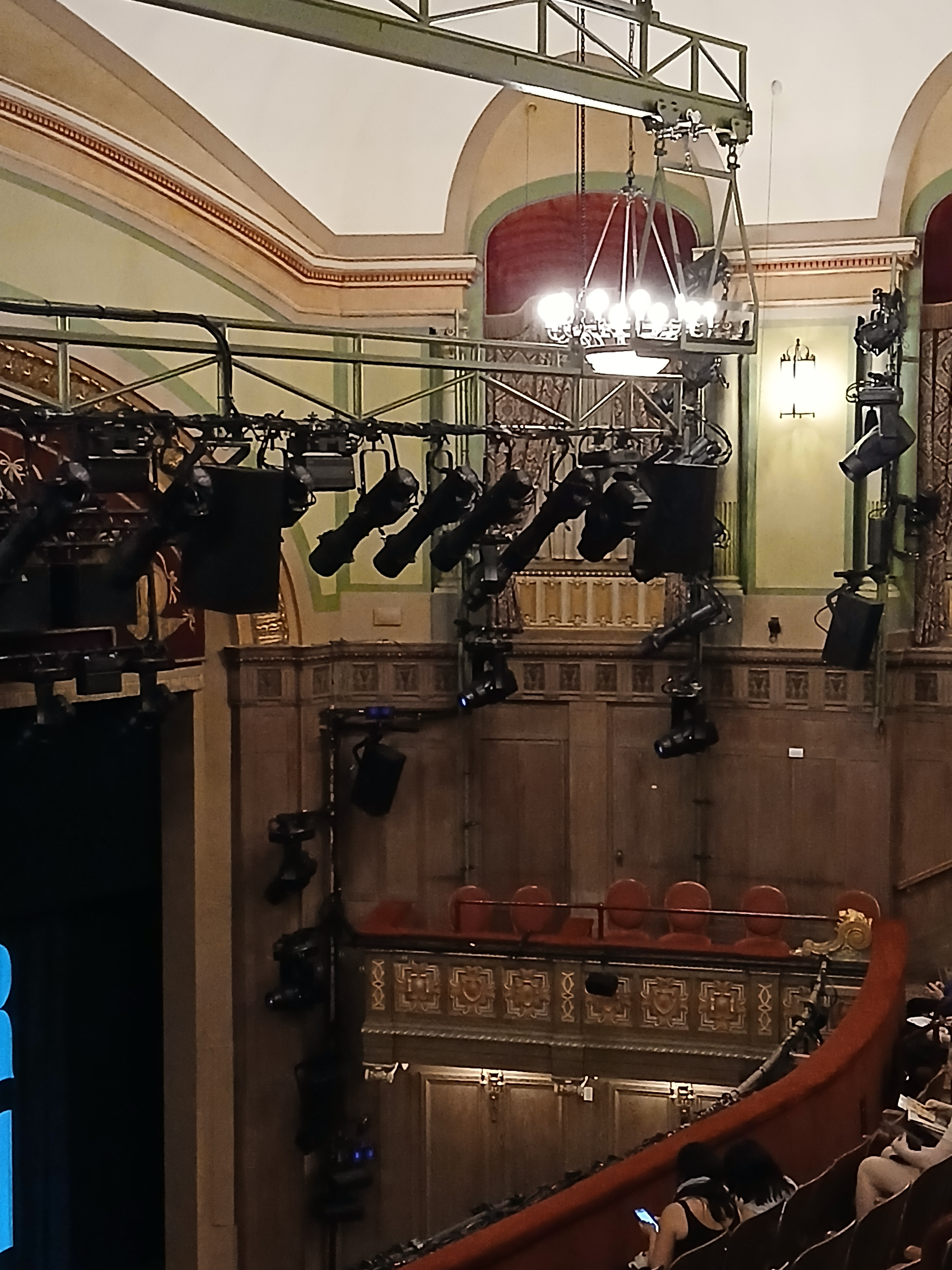
View of the boxes on the right side of the auditorium

Next to the boxes is an elliptical proscenium arch, which is surrounded by molded decorations. The proscenium opening measures about 36 feet 2 inches (11.02 m) wide and 25 feet 1 inch (7.65 m) tall. The sides of the proscenium arch are continuations of the wall paneling on the lowest two-thirds of the auditorium. The top of the proscenium opening contains a plasterwork, which is a continuation of the top third of the auditorium walls. The depth of the auditorium to the proscenium is 29 feet 9 inches (9.07 m), while the depth to the front of the stage is 33 feet 4 inches (10.16 m).

The coved ceiling rises above the entablature at the top of the auditorium's walls. The coved ceiling is interrupted at several points by the arched openings on the side walls and at the rear of the balcony seating. At these locations, there are groined ceiling sections with molded borders. The primary section of the ceiling has a wide band of latticework, which is interrupted by four semicircles with plasterwork borders. The latticework band surrounds the central ceiling panel. Four chandeliers hang from the ceiling.

==== Other interior spaces ====
The dressing rooms are separated from the stages of each theater by a heavy fireproof wall. The two theaters are separated from each other by a 2-foot-thick (0.61 m) wall. A gift shop called One Shubert Alley opened between the Shubert and Booth theaters in 1979, within three of the Booth's former dressing rooms. The emergency exits of both theaters were composed of "fire- and smoke-proof towers" rather than exterior fire escapes.

== History ==
Times Square became the epicenter for large-scale theater productions between 1900 and the Great Depression. Manhattan's theater district had begun to shift from Union Square and Madison Square during the first decade of the 20th century. From 1901 to 1920, forty-three theaters were built around Broadway in Midtown Manhattan, including the Shubert Theatre. The venue was developed by the Shubert brothers of Syracuse, New York, who expanded downstate into New York City in the first decade of the 20th century. After the death of Sam S. Shubert in 1905, his brothers Lee and Jacob J. Shubert expanded their theatrical operations significantly. The brothers controlled a quarter of all plays and three-quarters of theatrical ticket sales in the U.S. by 1925.

Meanwhile, Winthrop Ames, a member of a wealthy publishing family, did not enter the theatrical industry until 1905, when he was 34 years old. After being involved in the development of two large venues, Boston's Castle Square Theatre and New York City's New Theatre, Ames decided to focus on erecting smaller venues during the Little Theatre Movement.

=== Development and early years ===
==== Construction ====
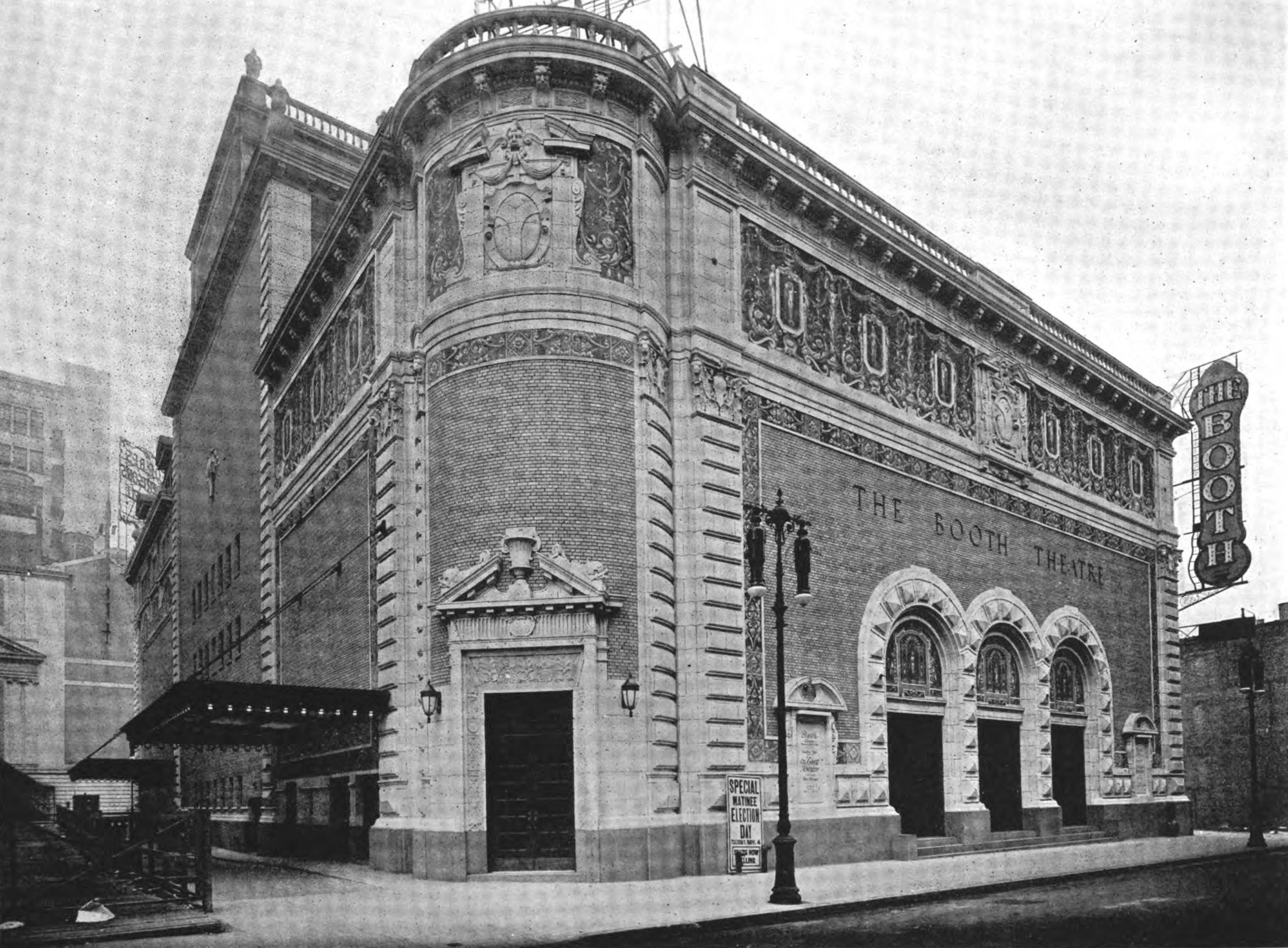
Early view of the theater

As the Shuberts were developing theaters in the early 1910s, Ames was planning to build a replacement for the New Theatre. Though the New had been completed in 1909, Ames and the theater's founders saw the venue, on the Upper West Side, as being too large and too far away from Times Square. The New Theatre's founders acquired several buildings at 219–225 West 44th Street and 218–230 West 45th Street in March 1911, for the construction of a "new New Theatre" there. The theater would have contained a private alley to the east. The project was canceled in December 1911, after the site had been cleared, when Ames announced he would build the Little Theatre (now the Hayes Theater) across 44th Street. The New Theatre's founders cited the difficulty of finding a director for the new New Theatre, as well as possible competition with Ames's Little Theatre.

In April 1912, Winthrop Ames and Lee Shubert decided to lease the site of the new New Theatre from the Astor family. Two theaters would be built on the site, along with a private alley to their east. Shubert's theater was to be the larger venue, being on 44th Street, while Ames's theater would be on 45th Street and would have half the seating capacity. The larger theater was known as the Sam S. Shubert Theatre, in memory of Lee's late brother, while the smaller one was named after Edwin Booth. The Booth Theatre became the second New York City venue to bear Booth's name, after Booth's Theatre at 23rd Street and Sixth Avenue, completed in 1869 for Booth himself. In the planning stages, the Booth Theatre on 45th Street was named the Ames Theatre. In September 1912, Ames indicated that he would call the theater the Gotham; the name was in use until at least August 1913. Ultimately, Ames named his 45th Street theater after Booth because Ames's father had worked directly for Booth at the old theater.

Documents indicate that several architects were consulted for the theaters' design, including Clarence H. Blackall, before the Shuberts hired Henry B. Herts for the job. An "ice palace" was also planned on the site now occupied by the Broadhurst and Schoenfeld theaters. Work on the two theaters started in May 1912. The next month, the new-building application for the New Theatre (which had been filed in 1911) was withdrawn, and two new-building applications for Shubert's and Ames's theaters were filed. Herts began accepting bids for construction contractors that July, and the Fleischmann Bros. Company was selected the following month to construct both of the new theaters. The project encountered several delays and disputes over costs. Documents indicate that the Fleischmann Bros. had expressed concerns of imprecise drawings and fired several workers. Further delays occurred when Ames requested several changes to the Booth's design in mid-1912; Herts said this would require the plans to be completely redone, while J. J. Shubert believed the changes were superficial.

==== Ames operation ====
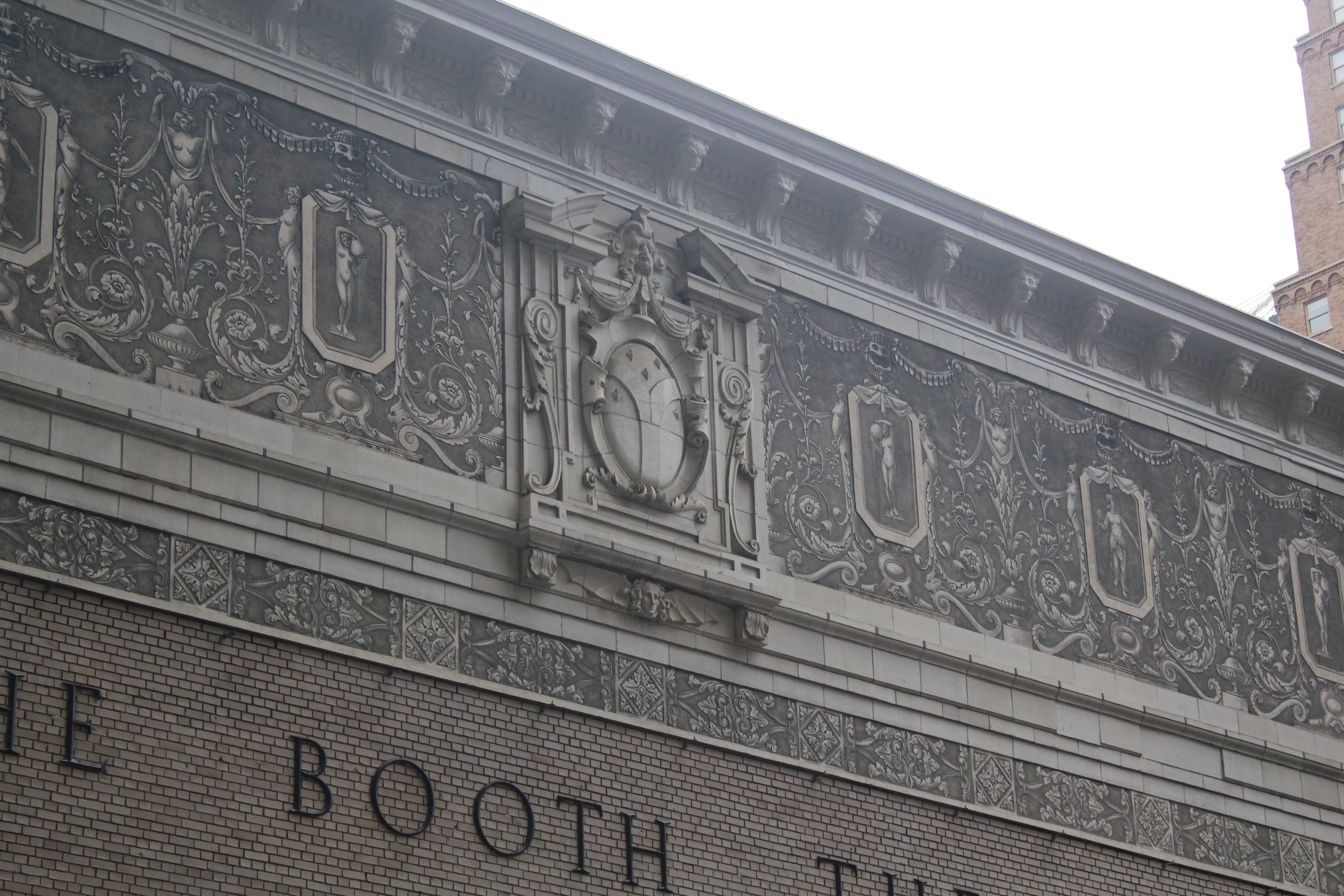
Stucco band of sgraffito decorations on the 45th Street facade

Ames wanted to operate the new theater as an intimate venue that was "large enough to make possible the usual scale of orchestra and balcony prices". The Booth was supposed to open on October 10, 1913, but its opening was postponed by six days because a heavy rain flooded the basement. The theater opened on October 16 with the Arnold Bennett play The Great Adventure with Lyn Harding and Janet Beecher; it closed after 52 performances. At the time, there were just two other theaters on the surrounding blocks: the Little Theatre and the now-demolished Weber and Fields' Music Hall. The first successful production at the Booth was Experience with William Elliott, which opened in late 1914 and continued for 255 performances. Ames also hosted a competition for the best play on an American subject by an American writer; he awarded the $10,000 prize to Alice Brown's play Children of Earth, which was shown at the Booth in January 1915. That April, the theater hosted The Bubble with Louis Mann, which had 176 performances.

The Booth hosted numerous moderately successful plays by notable playwrights in the late 1910s. Among these were George Bernard Shaw's Getting Married in 1916, featuring Henrietta Crosman and William Faversham. Another successful play arrived at the Booth in early 1917 with the opening of Clare Kummer's A Successful Calamity with William Gillette, Estelle Winwood, and Roland Young. De Luxe Annie opened later the same year, featuring Jane Grey and Vincent Serrano. The play Seventeen, based on a Booth Tarkington novel, opened at the Booth in 1918 with Ruth Gordon and Gregory Kelly. This was followed in 1919 by the mystery The Woman in Room 13 and the W. Somerset Maugham comedy Too Many Husbands.

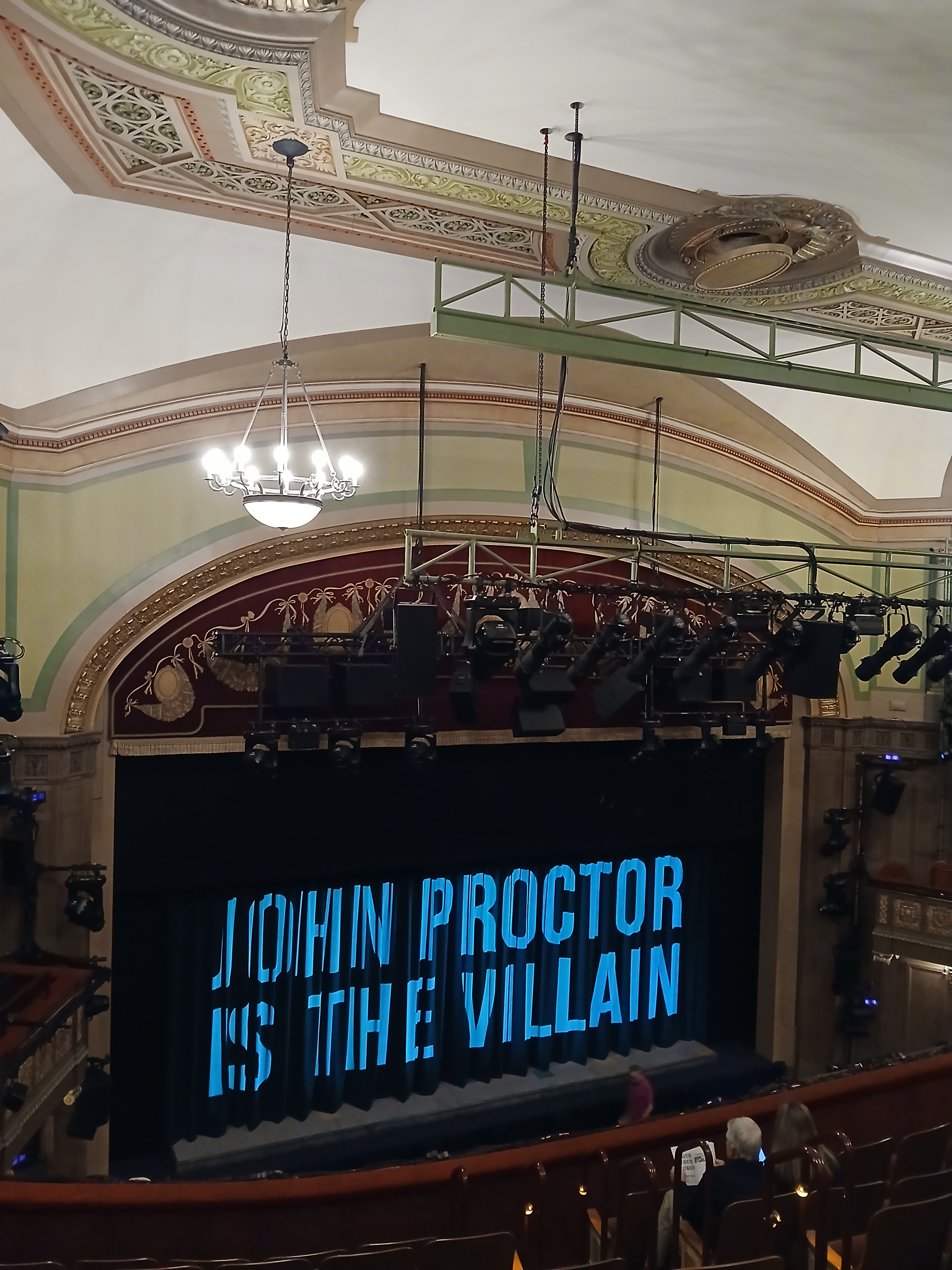
The proscenium arch

In 1920, the Booth hosted the melodrama The Purple Mask with Leo Ditrichstein; the play Not So Long Ago with Eva Le Gallienne, Sidney Blackmer, and Thomas Mitchell; and a dramatization of Mark Twain's The Prince and the Pauper with Ruth Findlay and William Faversham. The next year, the play The Green Goddess opened with George Arliss, staying for 440 performances. (Note: The Broadway League gives a different figure of 175 performances.) A. A. Milne's play The Truth About Blayds opened at the theater in 1922, featuring O. P. Heggie, Leslie Howard, Frieda Inescort, and Ferdinand Gottschalk. Seventh Heaven premiered later the same year, running for 683 performances. In 1924, the Booth hosted Dancing Mothers with Helen Hayes, Mary Young, and Henry Stephenson. This was followed shortly thereafter by George S. Kaufman and Edna Ferber's play Minick, as well as the Theatre Guild's version of Ferenc Molnár's play The Guardsman with Alfred Lunt and Lynn Fontanne.

Many productions at the Booth in 1925 and 1926 were flops. Among the Booth's productions in 1925 were Horace Liveright's revival of Shakespeare's Hamlet with Basil Sydney and Helen Chandler, as well as the comedy The Patsy with Claiborne Foster. The next year, Ames produced a short-lived version of Philip Barry's comedy White Wings. The Booth finally had another hit in early 1927 with the Maxwell Anderson comedy Saturday's Children with Beulah Bondi, Ruth Gordon, and Roger Pryor, which had 310 performances. Also that year, Leslie Howard and Frieda Inescort returned in Ames's production of John Galsworthy's Escape. The revue Grand Street Follies was presented at the Booth in 1928 and 1929, with James Cagney and Dorothy Sands. Ames announced his retirement from producing in October 1929, though he said he would continue to control the Booth Theatre. The same month, the play Jenny opened at the theater, featuring Jane Cowl and Guy Standing.

=== Shubert operation ===
==== 1930s and 1940s ====
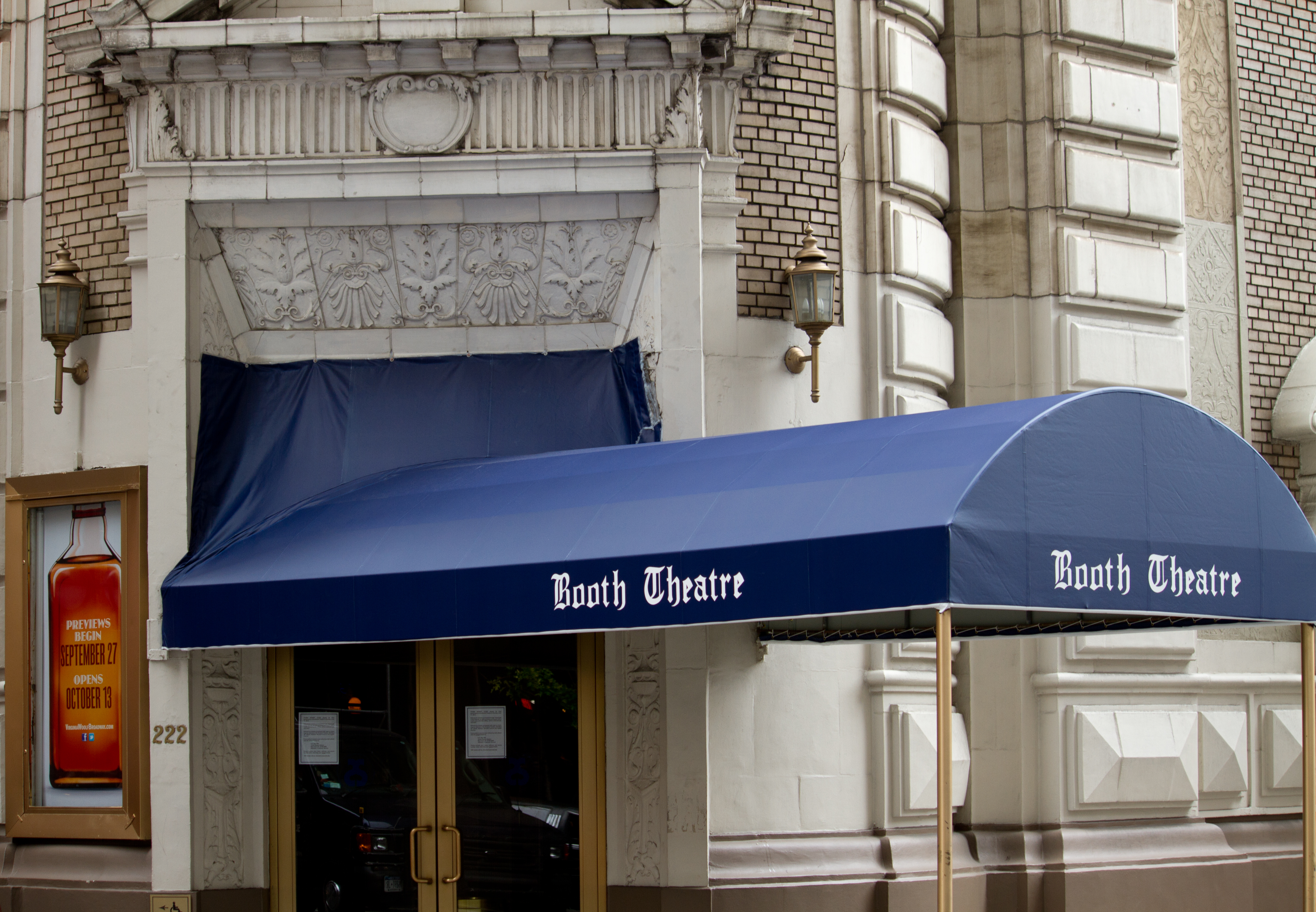
Canopy

The Booth hosted about fifty productions in the 1930s. Though the theater was always quickly rebooked because of its location in the center of the Theater District, many of these shows were short-lived or relocated from other venues. One of the more notable short runs was Elmer Harris's A Modern Virgin in 1931, in which Margaret Sullavan performed for the first time on a Broadway stage. This was followed in 1932 by Another Language, starring John Beal, Margaret Hamilton, Dorothy Stickney, and Margaret Wycherly for 348 performances. That year, Ames gave up his management of the Booth entirely, and the Shuberts took over. In 1934, the theater hosted some moderate successes such as No More Ladies, The Shining Hour, and The Distaff Side. The Booth's plays in 1935 included J. B. Priestley's Laburnum Grove; John Gearon and Louis Bromfield's short-lived De Luxe; Edward Chodorov's Kind Lady with Grace George; and James Warwick's Blind Alley with George Coulouris. This was followed in 1936 by the Chinese drama Lady Precious Stream; Sweet Aloes, where Rex Harrison premiered on Broadway; and the wrestling farce Swing Your Lady.

George Kaufman and Moss Hart's You Can't Take It with You, with Josephine Hull and Henry Travers, premiered in December 1936 and stayed for 837 performances, winning a Pulitzer Prize. It was followed by Patricia Collinge's drama Dame Nature and Philip Barry's drama Here Come the Clowns in 1938, as well as the Nancy Hamilton and Morgan Lewis revue One for the Money in 1939. Another Pulitzer-winning play, The Time of Your Life, opened at the Booth in late 1939. The Booth's productions in the 1940s generally lasted for longer than in the previous decade. In 1940, Hamilton and Lewis brought to the Booth the revue Two for the Show, a sequel to One for the Money that featured many of the same performers. This was followed in February 1941 by the Rose Franken play Claudia with Dorothy McGuire, Frances Starr, and Donald Cook, running for one year. The Noël Coward comedy Blithe Spirit, featuring Mildred Natwick, Clifton Webb, and Peggy Wood, moved to the Booth in May 1942 and ran until the next June. Another long run was The Two Mrs. Carrolls, which opened in 1943 with Elisabeth Bergner, Victor Jory, and Irene Worth and had 585 performances.

Ralph Nelson's drama The Wind Is Ninety appeared at the Booth in 1945, followed by Tennessee Williams and Donald Windham's comedy You Touched Me!. The next year, the theater hosted a revival of The Would-Be Gentleman; the mystery Swan Song; and a revival of The Playboy of the Western World. Among the Booth's productions in 1947 were the Norman Krasna play John Loves Mary, which featured Tom Ewell, Nina Foch, and William Prince. The following year, Molnár's comedy The Play's the Thing was revived, featuring Louis Calhern and Faye Emerson. James B. Allardice's At War with the Army was presented in 1949 with Gary Merrill, and The Velvet Glove opened at the end of that year with Grace George and Walter Hampden.

==== 1950s to 1970s ====
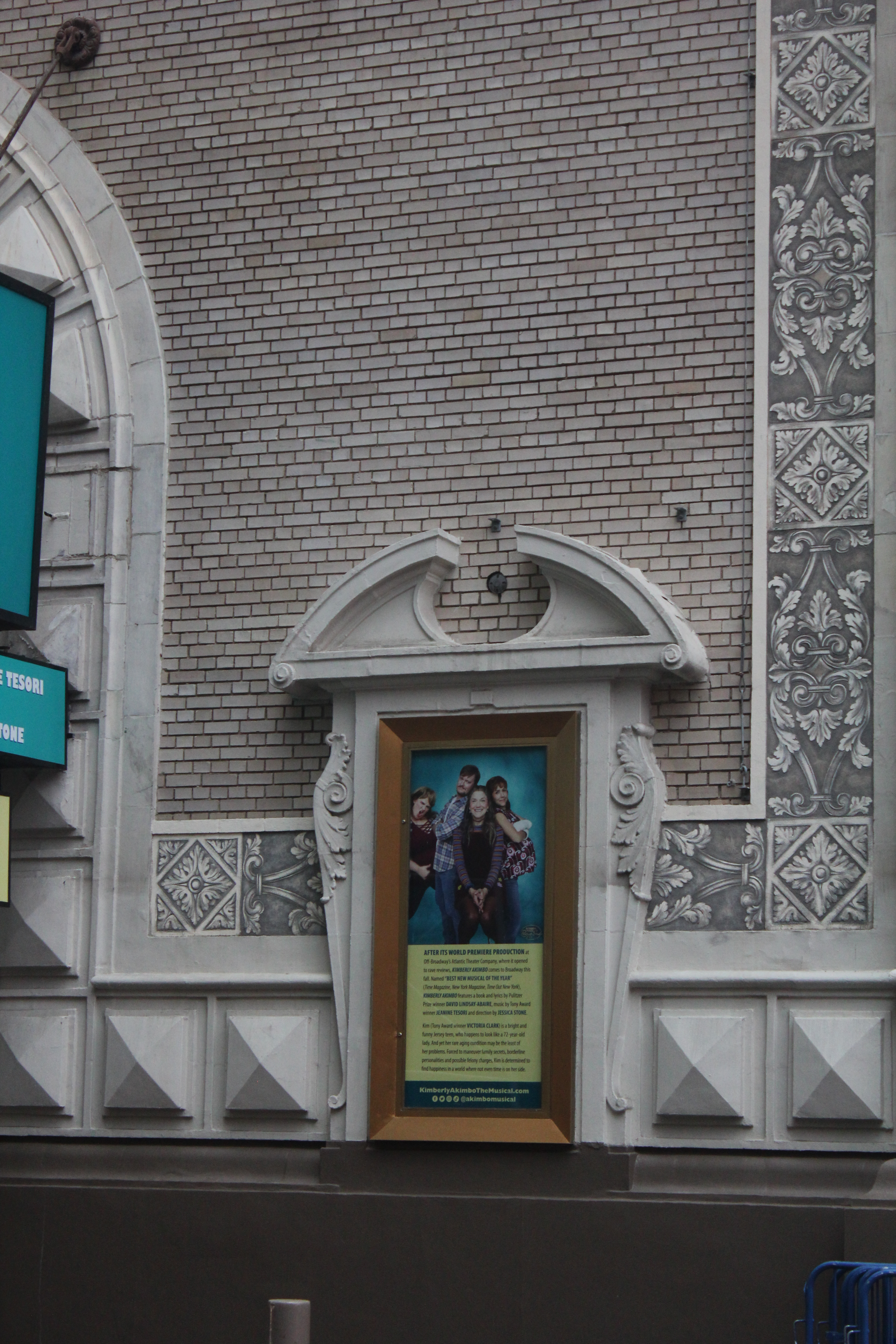
A sign on the 45th Street facade

William Inge's play Come Back, Little Sheba opened in 1950, featuring Shirley Booth and Sidney Blackmer; it was Inge's first Broadway production. Another hit was Beatrice Lillie's revue An Evening with Beatrice Lillie in 1952, which ran for 278 performances. Afterward, the Booth hosted the world premiere of the film Caesar in 1953, the first non-legitimate production in t he theater's history. The Booth's next success was a ten-month run of Jerome Chodorov's Anniversary Waltz with Macdonald Carey and Kitty Carlisle, which had relocated from the Broadhurst, starting in late 1954. Ralph Berkey and Henry Denker's Korean War drama Time Limit opened in 1956 and ran for 127 performances. Gore Vidal's comedy Visit to a Small Planet opened the next February, starring Cyril Ritchard and Eddie Mayehoff for a year. Subsequently, William Gibson's two-person play Two for the Seesaw opened in January 1958 and ran until late 1959.

Paddy Chayefsky's play The Tenth Man launched at the Booth in November 1959 and lasted for 623 performances over the next year. The play Julia, Jake and Uncle Joe with Claudette Colbert closed after its single performance in January 1961, but the comedy A Shot in the Dark was more successful the same year, starring Julie Harris, Walter Matthau, Gene Saks, and William Shatner. A comedy by Murray Schisgal, Luv, opened in 1964 and featured Alan Arkin, Anne Jackson, and Eli Wallach; it ran for about 900 performances. The comedy duo Flanders and Swann performed their revue At the Drop of Another Hat at the Booth in 1966, following the success of At the Drop of a Hat. The next year, Harold Pinter's play The Birthday Party was staged at the theater. After several relatively short runs, the Booth hosted the Leonard Gershe play Butterflies Are Free, which had 1,128 performances through 1972.

The Booth's first new production of the 1970s was Joseph Papp's version of Jason Miller's Pulitzer-winning play That Championship Season. The show moved from The Public Theater in September 1972 and ran for 844 performances over the next year and a half. Subsequently, in 1974, the Booth hosted a transfer of Terrence McNally's off-Broadway play Bad Habits, as well as the Schisgal play All Over Town. The next year, Papp announced that he would produce five plays at the Booth under the auspices of the New York Shakespeare Festival, offering tickets at low prices. Papp canceled the program due to a lack of money, and only one production was staged, the short-lived The Leaf People. This was followed by the Jerome Kern musical Very Good Eddie at the end of 1975. Another hit was For Colored Girls Who Have Considered Suicide / When the Rainbow Is Enuf, which opened in 1976 and ran for 742 performances over the next two years.

In 1979, the Shuberts hired Melanie Kahane to redesign the Booth Theatre. The project involved restoring the Booth's original design within three weeks; at the time, Kahane characterized the theater as a "sad old sack". Kahane removed some design details such as French chandeliers, as she believed they were incompatible with the theater's design scheme. The auditorium was redecorated with a beige and brown color scheme. In addition, three former dressing rooms were converted into the One Shubert Alley store. The Booth ended the decade with a transfer of Bernard Pomerance's off-Broadway play The Elephant Man, which opened in 1979 and stayed for 916 performances.

==== 1980s and 1990s ====
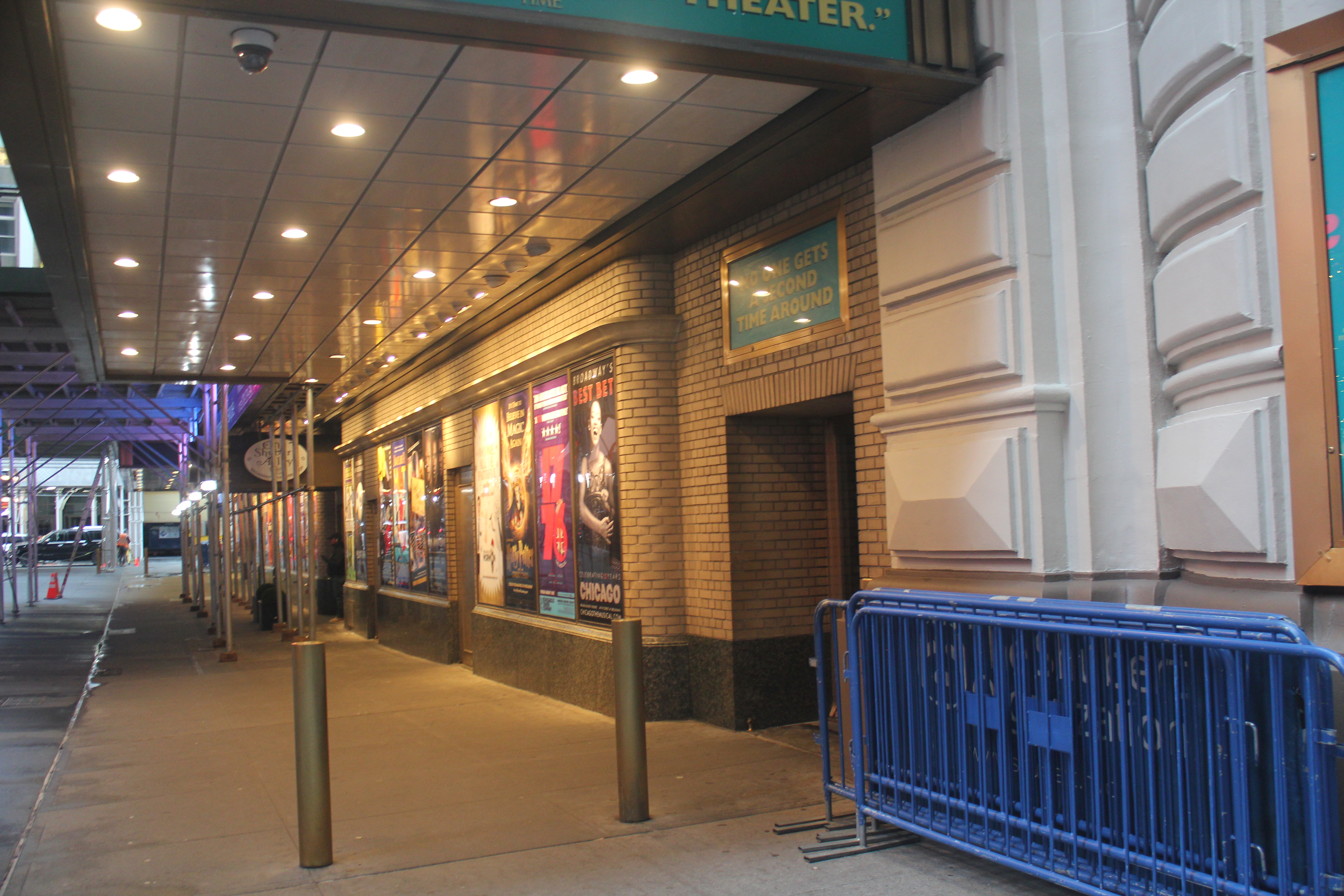
Doorways to the theater on Shubert Alley

Bill C. Davis's play Mass Appeal transferred to the Booth from off-Broadway in 1981, starring Michael O'Keefe and Milo O'Shea. The Royal Shakespeare Company presented the C. P. Taylor play Good with Alan Howard in 1982, and Larry Atlas's Total Abandon flopped the next year after its single performance. This was followed in 1984 by Stephen Sondheim and James Lapine's Pulitzer-winning musical Sunday in the Park With George with Mandy Patinkin and Bernadette Peters. The Herb Gardner play I'm Not Rappaport relocated to the Booth from off-Broadway in November 1985, staying for 890 performances until early 1988. The final hit of the decade was Shirley Valentine, which opened in 1989 and had 324 performances.

The New York City Landmarks Preservation Commission (LPC) had started to consider protecting the Booth as an official city landmark in 1982, with discussions continuing over the next several years. The LPC designated both the Booth's facade and part of the Booth's interior as landmarks on November 4, 1987. This was part of the LPC's wide-ranging effort in 1987 to grant landmark status to Broadway theaters. The New York City Board of Estimate ratified the designations in March 1988. The Shuberts, the Nederlanders, and Jujamcyn collectively sued the LPC in June 1988 to overturn the landmark designations of 22 theaters, including the Booth, on the merit that the designations severely limited the extent to which the theaters could be modified. The lawsuit was escalated to the New York Supreme Court and the Supreme Court of the United States, but these designations were ultimately upheld in 1992.

In October 1990, Lynn Ahrens and Stephen Flaherty's musical Once on This Island launched at the Booth, running for 469 performances. This was followed in 1992 by Frank Loesser's The Most Happy Fella for 221 performances, as well as Frank McGuinness's play Someone Who'll Watch Over Me for 216 performances. Jonathan Tolins's play The Twilight of the Golds had a short run in late 1993, as did Arthur Miller's Broken Glass in 1994. At the end of 1994, the Booth hosted a limited run of A Tuna Christmas. The next year, the Booth hosted Emily Mann's production of Having Our Say, which ran for 308 performances. The Booth next hosted two solo shows: Love Thy Neighbor by Jackie Mason in 1996, as well as Defending the Caveman by Rob Becker (later replaced by Michael Chiklis). David Mamet's set of three one-act plays, The Old Neighborhood, ran 197 performances at the Booth in late 1997 and early 1998. The revue An Evening with Jerry Herman and Sandra Bernhard's stand-up routine I'm Still Here... Damn It! were staged in 1998, followed by David Hare's Via Dolorosa and Barry Humphries's Dame Edna: The Royal Tour in 1999.

==== 2000s to present ====
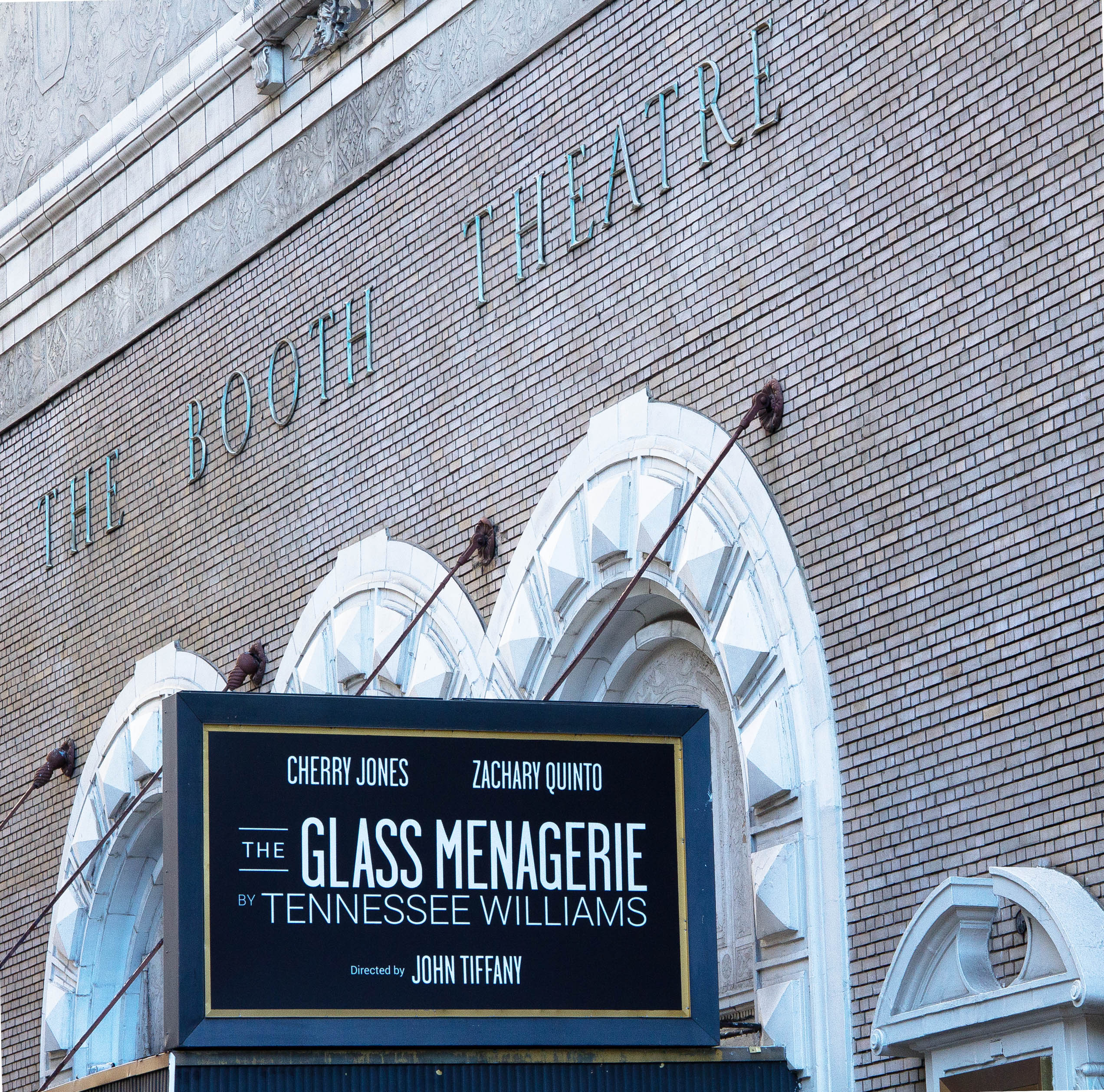
The Glass Menagerie at the Booth Theatre in 2013

Lily Tomlin performed her solo show The Search for Signs of Intelligent Life in the Universe in 2000, followed by another solo show in 2002, Bea Arthur's Bea Arthur on Broadway. A 2002 revival of I'm Not Rappaport closed after 51 performances, and Thornton Wilder's play Our Town was revived the same year. The Retreat from Moscow opened in 2003 for a 148-performance run, and Eve Ensler's solo The Good Body flopped after a month in 2004. Next was the drama The Pillowman and a revival of Edward Albee's Seascape in 2005, then revivals of Faith Healer and Butley in 2006. Joan Didion's solo play The Year of Magical Thinking and Conor McPherson's drama The Seafarer both had runs of several months in 2007, and Laurence Fishburne also headed the solo drama Thurgood for over a hundred performances in 2008. By contrast, Horton Foote's Dividing the Estate ran for only one and a half months in late 2008, and the musical The Story of My Life had five performances in 2009.

The musical Next to Normal opened at the Booth in April 2009 and ran until January 2011. After a seven-performance run of the play High at the theater in April 2011, a longer run of Other Desert Cities premiered later that year. Generally, the Booth hosted straight plays during the 2010s. These included Who's Afraid of Virginia Woolf? in 2012, I'll Eat You Last: A Chat with Sue Mengers and The Glass Menagerie in 2013, and The Velocity of Autumn and The Elephant Man in 2014. Hand to God was the most successful production during this time, opening in 2015 and running for 337 performances. Other plays at the Booth included Hughie, An Act of God, and Les Liaisons Dangereuses in 2016; Significant Other and Meteor Shower in 2017; and The Boys in the Band and American Son in 2018.

The Booth hosted Gary: A Sequel to Titus Andronicus during early 2019, followed later the same year by a limited run of Freestyle Love Supreme. The theater closed on March 12, 2020, due to the COVID-19 pandemic in New York City. A revival of Who's Afraid of Virginia Woolf?, which had only played previews at the Booth before the shutdown, was then canceled. The Booth reopened on October 7, 2021, with a limited run of Freestyle Love Supreme, which closed after three months. A short-lived revival of For Colored Girls Who Have Considered Suicide / When the Rainbow Is Enuf opened at the Booth in April 2022, followed by Kimberly Akimbo from November 2022 to April 2024. Several limited runs followed, including the plays The Roommate starting in September 2024, John Proctor is the Villain starting in April 2025, and Little Bear Ridge Road starting in October 2025. A limited run of the play Proof opened at the Booth in April 2026, followed by a limited run of Downstate that November.

== Notable productions ==
Productions are listed by the year of their first performance.

Notable productions at the theater
Opening year	Name	Refs.
1913	The Great Adventure	
1915	Our American Cousin	
1916	David Garrick	
1916	The Co-Respondent	
1916	Getting Married	
1917	A Successful Calamity	
1919	The Woman in Room 13	
1919	The Better 'Ole	
1919	Too Many Husbands	
1920	The Purple Mask	
1920	The Prince and the Pauper	
1921	The Green Goddess	
1922	The Truth About Blayds	
1922	Seventh Heaven	
1924	Dancing Mothers	
1924	Paolo and Francesca	
1925	The Fall of Eve	
1925	Hamlet	
1926	John Gabriel Borkman	
1927	Escape	
1930	Uncle Vanya	
1930	The Man in Possession	
1931	The Bread-Winner	
1931	After All	
1931	If Love Were All	
1932	Jewel Robbery	
1932	Another Language	
1933	For Services Rendered	
1933	Candide	
1934	No More Ladies	
1934	The Shining Hour	
1934	The Distaff Side	
1935	Laburnum Grove	
1935	Kind Lady	
1936	Lady Precious Stream	
1936	Swing Your Lady	
1936	You Can't Take It with You	
1939	The Time of Your Life	
1940	Two for the Show	
1941	The Cream in the Well	
1941	Claudia	
1942	Blithe Spirit	
1943	The Two Mrs. Carrolls	
1946	The Would-Be Gentleman	
1946	He Who Gets Slapped	
1946	Playboy of the Western World	
1947	John Loves Mary	
1947	Tenting Tonight	
1947	Portrait in Black	
1947	Duet for Two Hands	
1947	An Inspector Calls	
1948	The Play's the Thing	
1948	The Shop at Sly Corner	
1949	Richard III	
1949	At War with the Army	
1950	Come Back, Little Sheba	
1951	Lace on Her Petticoat	
1952	An Evening With Beatrice Lillie	
1953	Late Love	
1954	Dial M for Murder	
1954	All Summer Long	
1955	The Heavenly Twins	
1956	The Matchmaker	
1957	Visit to a Small Planet	
1958	Two for the Seesaw	
1959	The Tenth Man	
1961	A Shot in the Dark	
1963	Rattle of a Simple Man	
1963	Spoon River Anthology	
1964	Luv	
1966	At the Drop of Another Hat	
1967	The Birthday Party	
1968	Avanti!	
1968	Leonard Sillman's New Faces of 1968	
1969	Butterflies Are Free	
1972	That Championship Season	
1974	Bad Habits	
1974	Brief Lives	
1975	Very Good Eddie	
1976	For Colored Girls Who Have Considered Suicide / When the Rainbow Is Enuf	
1979	Monteith and Rand	
1979	The Elephant Man	
1981	An Evening with Dave Allen	
1981	Mass Appeal	
1982	Good	
1983	American Buffalo	
1984	Sunday in the Park with George	
1985	I'm Not Rappaport	
1988	A Walk in the Woods	
1988	Michael Feinstein in Concert: "Isn't It Romantic"	
1989	Shirley Valentine	
1989	Tru	
1990	Once on This Island	
1992	The Most Happy Fella	
1992	Someone Who'll Watch Over Me	
1993	The Twilight of the Golds	
1994	Broken Glass	
1994	A Tuna Christmas	
1995	Having Our Say	
1997	The Old Neighborhood	
1998	An Evening with Jerry Herman	
1998	I'm Still Here... Damn It!	
1999	Via Dolorosa	
2000	The Search for Signs of Intelligent Life in the Universe	
2001	Bea Arthur on Broadway	
2002	I'm Not Rappaport	
2002	Our Town	
2003	The Retreat from Moscow	
2005	The Pillowman	
2006	Seascape	
2006	Faith Healer	
2006	Butley	
2007	The Year of Magical Thinking	
2007	The Seafarer	
2008	Thurgood	
2008	Dividing the Estate	
2009	The Story of My Life	
2009	Next to Normal	
2011	High	
2011	Other Desert Cities	
2012	Who's Afraid of Virginia Woolf?	
2013	I'll Eat You Last: A Chat with Sue Mengers	
2013	The Glass Menagerie	
2014	The Elephant Man	
2015	Hand to God	
2016	Hughie	
2016	An Act of God	
2016	Les Liaisons Dangereuses	
2017	Significant Other	
2017	Meteor Shower	
2018	The Boys in the Band	
2019	Gary: A Sequel to Titus Andronicus	
2019	Freestyle Love Supreme	
2020	Who's Afraid of Virginia Woolf?	(Note: Due to the COVID-19 pandemic, the revival of Who's Afraid of Virginia Woolf? did not officially open at the Booth Theatre; it only played previews.)
2021	Freestyle Love Supreme	
2022	For Colored Girls Who Have Considered Suicide / When the Rainbow Is Enuf	
2022	Kimberly Akimbo	
2024	The Roommate	
2025	John Proctor is the Villain	
2025	Little Bear Ridge Road	
2026	Proof	
2026	Downstate	

== Box office record ==
Bette Midler set a box-office record in I'll Eat You Last: A Chat with Sue Mengers with a gross of US$865,144 in May 2013. The Elephant Man, starring Bradley Cooper, topped Midler's record by grossing US$1,058,547 for an eight-performance week ending December 28, 2014. The record as of 2023 is held by The Boys in the Band. The production grossed US$1,152,649 over eight performances for the week ending August 12, 2018.

== See also ==
- List of Broadway theaters
- List of New York City Designated Landmarks in Manhattan from 14th to 59th Streets
