= Theatrical adaptation =

Play adapted from an existing work

In a theatrical adaptation, material from another artistic medium, such as a novel or a film is re-written according to the needs and requirements of the theatre and turned into a play or musical.

== Elision and interpolation ==
Directors must make artistic decisions about what to include and exclude from the source material. The original mediums have a significant influence on these decisions, for example, much must be elided in the adaptation from a novel to a stage production, due to practical time constraints. These decisions are always controversial and comparisons between the original and the adaptation are unavoidable.

== Novel adaptation ==
The Phantom of the Opera was originally a novel by Gaston Leroux written as a serialisation from 1909 to 1910. It is the longest running show in Broadway history. There are numerous examples of novel adaptations in the field, including Cats, which was based on Old Possum's Book of Practical Cats (1939) by T.S. Eliot and Les Misérables, which was originally an 1862 historical novel by Victor Hugo. Tales of the South Pacific would be adapted into the Rodgers and Hammerstein musical South Pacific.

== Film adaptation ==
The Lion King was originally a 1994 Disney animated film and its theatrical adaptation has become the most successful musical in history.

== Adaptations from other sources ==
The 1975 musical Chicago was adapted from a 1926 play by Maurine Dallas Watkins, who was a reporter and used her experiences with real-life criminals to form the basis of the story. The musical Oklahoma! is an adaptation of the play Green Grow the Lilacs by Lynn Riggs.
