= The Cream in the Well =

1940 play by Lynn Riggs

The Cream in the Well is a full-length tragedy play written by Lynn Riggs. Completed in 1940 and copyrighted the same year after opening in Washington D.C., it had a twenty-four week run on Broadway at The Booth Theatre. The plot takes place in 1906 in Indian Territory, leading up to the statehood of Oklahoma. Set during the Allotment period, the play follows the ratification of the Curtis Act. Backlash from newspaper critics influenced the play's initial reception: the portrayal of incestuous relationships was considered especially controversial. Later critics have praised The Cream in the Well for creating Cherokee characters and non-Native characters that demonstrate the “rhythm and poetic quality” of regional speech.

== Character list ==
=== Sawters family ===
- Mrs. Lou Sawters is Mr. Dave Sawters's wife and mother to Julie, Clabe, and Bina Sawters.
- Mr. Dave Sawters is Mrs. Lou Sawters's husband and father to Julie, Clabe, and Bina Sawters.
- Julie Sawters is the elder daughter of Mr. and Mrs. Sawters and sister to Clabe and Bina Sawters. She has close affections for her brother Clabe.
- Clabe Sawters is the son of Mr. and Mrs. Sawters and brother to Julie and Bina Sawters. He has a complex relationship with Opal Dunham and Julie Sawters.
- Bina Sawters is the younger daughter of Mr. and Mrs. Sawters and sister to Julie and Clabe Sawters.

=== Relations of the Sawters family ===
- Blocky Lockhart is a family friend of the Sawters and is the romantic pursuer of Bina Sawters.
- Opal Dunham is Gard Dunham's wife and rival to Julie Sawters for Clabe Sawters's affections.
- Gard Dunham is Opal Dunham's husband and future spouse to Julie Sawters.

== Synopsis ==
=== Act I, Scene I ===
The entirety of the play takes place at the farmhouse of the Sawters family near Big Lake, Oklahoma in 1906. Bina, the youngest child, and Dave, the father, are described as speaking colloquially, while Lou Sawters, the family's matriarch, and Julie and Clabe, the elder two children, are portrayed as having a more formal cadence. Before the commencement of the play, Clabe has left the farm to join the United States Navy, and Julie has left and since returned from the Cherokee Female Seminary.

The family is preparing for the arrival of Opal and Gard Dunham, neighbors of the family, for dinner. Before marrying Gard, Opal was engaged to Clabe. Similarly, Gard once confessed his love for Julie, but was refused. As Bina, Lou, and Julie prepare for the couple's arrival, Dave arrives at the farm with a letter from Clabe. In the letter, Clabe asserts that he intends to never return to the farm; he further states that it was Julie who convinced him to leave in the first place. Finally, in a postscript to his letter, Clabe claims that “something awful and evil” compels Julie. Julie becomes upset and runs upstairs mere moments before the arrival of Opal and Gard. She returns soon after, gives a brooch to Bina that had originally been given to her by Clabe, and invites Opal and Gard to stay the night.

=== Scene II ===
As the family and their guests prepare for bed, Opal confronts Julie with the knowledge that the other kept Clabe from marrying her, which Julie admits. Julie then antagonizes Opal to the point of hysteria, causing her to flee the home. Lou enters the room and insists that Julie is intentionally cruel. Bina enters distraught and explains that Opal drowned while trying to row home. As Lou and Bina withdraw to help recover the body, Julie angrily asks a portrait of Clabe if this is what he wanted.

=== Scene III ===
At Opal's bedside, Gard agrees to help Dave on the farm. As he ruminates over the loss of Opal and whether or not it is significant to him, Dave tells him about the Sawter family's initial home. He explains that the family had a previous farm with a fresh water well near Verdigris, but that for an unclear reason, any cream that the family would attempt to keep cool by lowering into the well would inevitably spoil. Later, Julie privately voices regret at her part in Opal's death. Gard enters then and explains that he still loves Julie. At the end of their conversation, Julie bitterly agrees to marry him.

=== Act II, Scene I ===
Time passes, and it is Thanksgiving Day. Bina, Lou, and Dave are preparing for the arrivals of Clabe and Julie, the latter of whom now lives with Gard. Julie and Gard arrive, Gard in a state of serious inebriation. He bickers with the family, but their conversation is interrupted by the arrival of Clabe and his friend Blocky. After the group exchanges greetings, Julie descends from the stair, wearing the brooch that she gave to Bina. She and Clabe embrace. He explains that he has been discharged, and that he doesn't know if he will return to the farm or not. Julie insists that he take Blocky up on an offer to become a lawyer, and Clabe asks why she wants him to leave so suddenly. Gard bristles, lashes out at both Clabe and Julie, and collapses. The family disperses, leaving Lou and Julie alone. Lou says that she intends to tell Clabe that Julie corrupts those she becomes close to, despite Julie's protests.

=== Scene II ===
After dinner, Clabe says he intends to stay on the farm. Julie expresses that she would like to be friends as they once were. He becomes angry and confesses that he purchased her brooch with money that he earned as a sex worker, presumably one who had sex with other men. When Julie reacts with disgust, he states that “even to think about evil is death”. Clabe then demands that Julie admits that they are in love with each other, and she becomes conflicted. Julie acknowledges that there is love between them, but she maintains that it is taboo, saying that she can't face it. She resolves to walk into the lake and drown to avert the need for either of them to reckon with their feelings for each other. Clabe initially protests but eventually recognizes that he doesn't want to stop her, and Julie makes her way to the water. As she does so, she insists that Clabe forget her, invoking his belief that evil cannot be acknowledged. She exits, and Bina enters, asking where Julie is. After a while, she realizes that she doesn't care, and she begins to cheerily play a song on the organ.

== Themes and Motifs ==
=== Views about women ===
According to Jason Michael, Lynn Riggs's works with women characters share a theme of tragedy. In the case of Julie Sawters, the main reason for her unhappy ending was her inability to come to terms with her dwindling relationship with Clabe Sawters. Examining Julie's autonomy, which leads to her inner guilt and suicide, Michael states that almost all of Riggs's women either wind up emotionally or physically dead.

Craig Womack argues that Julie's suicide represents a return to conformity for Clabe, asserting that the secrecy surrounding the incestuous relationship mirrors that which surrounded many gay relationships at the time. He observes that the play preserves the gay character while killing off the woman, a substitution that he considers "not an improvement".

=== Views about men ===
Jason Michael states that the men in Lynn Riggs's work are much more "numerous" and "diverse" in their natures and rewards. According to Michael, the dominant theme that accounts for Clabe Sawters is that of the "Troubled Idealistic Poet-Boy." Clabe is surrounded by characters that shape his archetype such as his father, who fails to understand the poetic, soft side of Clabe, along with his sister Julie who had a morally forbidden love with Clabe. Michael also states that archetypal men like Clabe have trouble following social norms usually as a result of their alienation within a society that does not make sense to them.

=== Views about same-sex relationships ===
As noted by Jason Michael, there are no surviving, written records of how complex characters like Clabe Sawters were handled by the actors or received by the general public. The theme of homosexuality or homoeroticisms surfaces when Clabe engages with U.S. Navy men looking for gay sexual encounters around ports. Michael argues that Clabe's participation in paid sexual labor gets lost under the melodramatic nature of Clabe's other scenes.

Craig Womack maintains that the play shies away from an acceptance of gayness, with Julie advising Clabe to forget her (and by extension, all romantic feelings that are considered deviant) in her final moments, reinforcing the play's refusal to endorse its own gay themes. Womack relates this apprehension to events in Lynn Riggs' personal life, noting that the playwright likely died without the support necessary to accept his own identity as a gay man.

== Reception & Interpretations ==
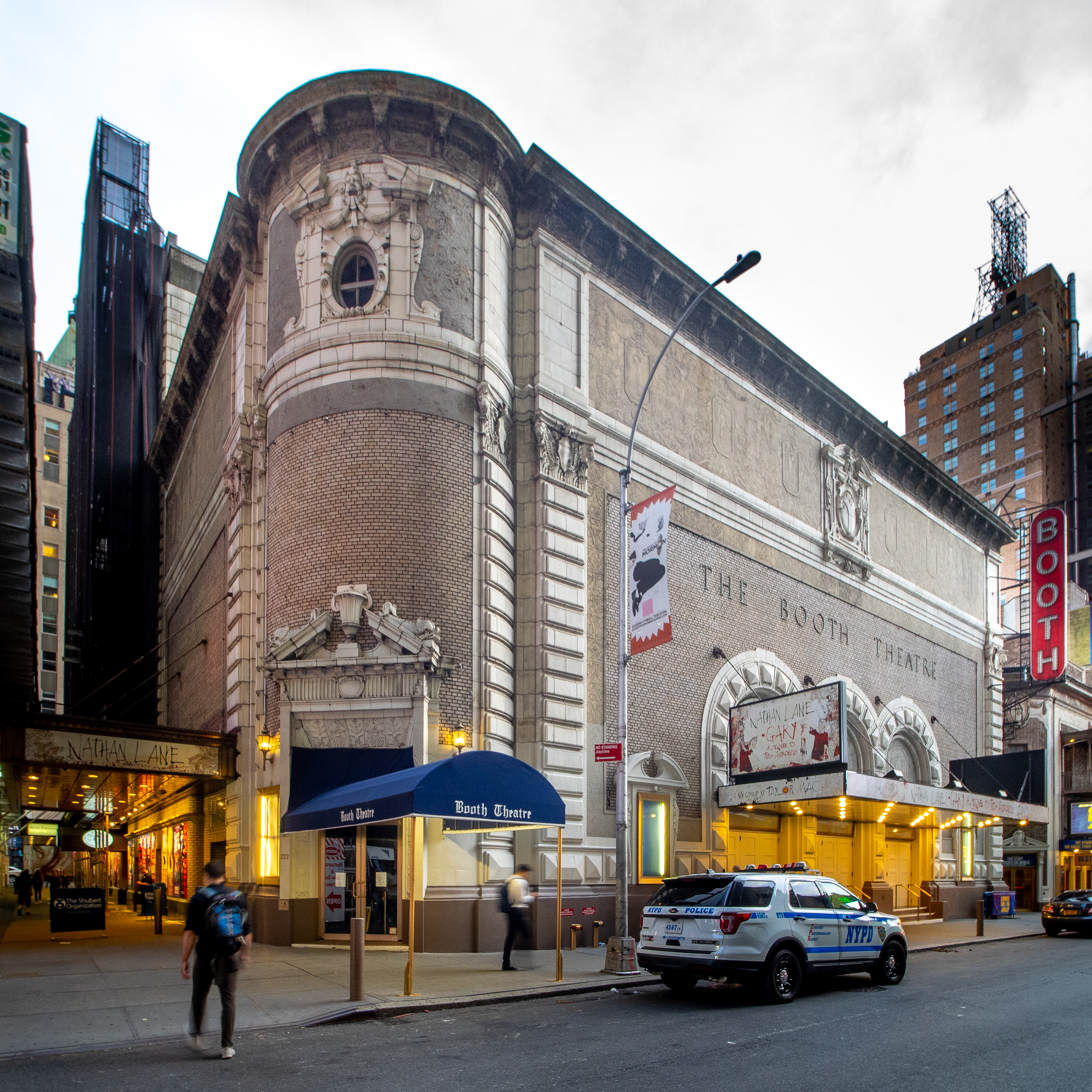
The Booth Theatre, home to the Broadway premiere of The Cream in the Well.

=== Reception ===
The reception of The Cream in the Well was largely negative upon its premiere on Broadway. Critical aversion to the play often stemmed from the play's engagement with taboo themes such as incest and homosexuality. The New York Times critic, Brooks Atkinson, stated that it was difficult to find further meaning beyond well-written prose. Atkinson described Julie as an "intelligent woman" who "radiates death and destruction wherever she goes." In 1941, Riggs read The Cream in the Well to a group of his friends. Following the reading, his peer Ann Webster and others wrote letters to The New York Times's "Drama Mailbag". On March 9, Webster's letter was published stating, "... The play is a picture of the world today." In this letter, Webster took time to respond to Atkinson's view of Julie, saying, "If Mr. Riggs had brought in something easy for Julie to do as an expression of her creative life force, then there would have been no dramatic problem."

Through critical reviews, starting with the opening night article in The New York Times that described The Cream in the Well as "The Lynn Riggs Play, With an Oklahoma Background", Lynn Riggs's play was tied in conversation to the land of Oklahoma and the people in it. A Commonweal critic was under the impression that Riggs was attempting to write Greek tragedy, but with Oklahoma farmers in place of royalty, while in Webster's letter she asserts that the play fits into the "proportions of a Greek tragedy." The Cream in the Well came to Broadway in a time of war, when the focus in popular American theater was on musicals as a means of escapism. Riggs has been described as a playwright who “has never shown the slightest desire to adjust his work to the current demands of Broadway.” Meanwhile, contemporary criticism tilts more towards positive. Phyllis Cole Braunlich describes The Cream in the Well as “powerful dramatic literature.”

=== Intersectional criticism ===
Modern academic criticism of the plays of Lynn Riggs, including The Cream in the Well, has focused on the intersectionality of the author's identity as a gay, Indigenous playwright. Craig Womack has argued that the play is one of only two by Riggs with an explicitly gay event, citing Clabe's prostitution as one such occurrence. Womack further states that The Cream in the Well is one of Riggs's most direct portrayals of Indigenous themes. In evaluating the roles of race and sexuality in the play, Womack argues that gay identity is "far more transgressive than race", citing the willingness of the characters to openly discuss racial issues, and their comparative reluctance to discuss sexuality, as evidence.

Vivian Baker Donaldson proposes that the role the taboo of incest plays in the show is a stand-in for a taboo of the time: homosexuality. In the show, the word “incest” is not spoken by the characters. Donaldson points out, “the word, alone, is bad magic”. When Clabe urges Julie to say what is between them, he states, “Let's say it out plain, and see if it can hurt us.”

Womack has also argued that Riggs’ portrayal of Oklahoma as a whole, which ranges from idyllic to nightmarish, conveys a deeper attempt at understanding himself as a gay man, and further, an Indigenous one. He writes that Riggs’ fixation on a time in Oklahoman history that was “kinder and gentler” than the early 20th century betrayed a lack of framework at the time for conveying a gay, Indigenous character. The emergence of Clabe Sawter as a character who can be interpreted as both presents a rare instance of directness for Riggs, according to Womack.
