= Tender Comrade =

1943 film by Edward Dmytryk

- Theatrical poster
- Directed by: Edward Dmytryk
- Written by: Dalton Trumbo
- Produced by: David Hempstead
- Starring: Ginger Rogers; Robert Ryan; Ruth Hussey; Kim Hunter; Patricia Collinge; Mady Christians
- Cinematography: Russell Metty
- Edited by: Roland Gross
- Music by: Leigh Harline
- Distributed by: RKO Radio Pictures
- Release date: December 29, 1943 (U.S.)
- Running time: 101 minutes (copyright print)
- Country: United States
- Language: English
- Budget: $750,000 (approx)

Tender Comrade is a 1943 black-and-white war drama film released by RKO Radio Pictures, showing women on the home front living communally while their husbands are away at war.

The film stars Ginger Rogers, Robert Ryan, Ruth Hussey, and Kim Hunter and was directed by Edward Dmytryk. The film was later used by the HUAC as evidence of Dalton Trumbo spreading communist propaganda. Trumbo was subsequently blacklisted.

The film's title comes from a line in Robert Louis Stevenson's poem "My Wife" first published in Songs of Travel and Other Verses (1896).

== Plot ==
Jo Jones works in an airplane factory and longs for the day when she will see her husband again. The couple have a heart-wrenching farewell at the train station before he leaves for overseas duty. With their husbands off fighting in World War II, Jo and her co-workers struggle to pay living expenses. Dissatisfied, they decide to pool their money and rent a house together. Soon after, they hire Manya, a German immigrant housekeeper. Jo discovers she is pregnant and ends up having a son whom she names Chris, after his father. The women are overjoyed when Doris's husband comes home, but the same day Jo receives a telegram informing her that her husband has been killed. She hides her grief and descends the stairs in order to rejoin the homecoming celebration.

== Cast ==
- Ginger Rogers as Jo Jones
- Robert Ryan as Chris Jones
- Ruth Hussey as Barbara Thomas
- Patricia Collinge as Helen Stacey
- Mady Christians as Manya Lodge
- Kim Hunter as Doris Dumbrowski
- Jane Darwell as Mrs. Henderson
- Richard Martin as Mike Dumbrowski

== Reception ==
The film made a profit of $843,000. Rogers' fee was $150,000 plus ten percent of the profits over gross receipts of $1.5 million; by 1953 this had earned her $105,000.
