= Patricia Collinge =

Irish-American actress and writer

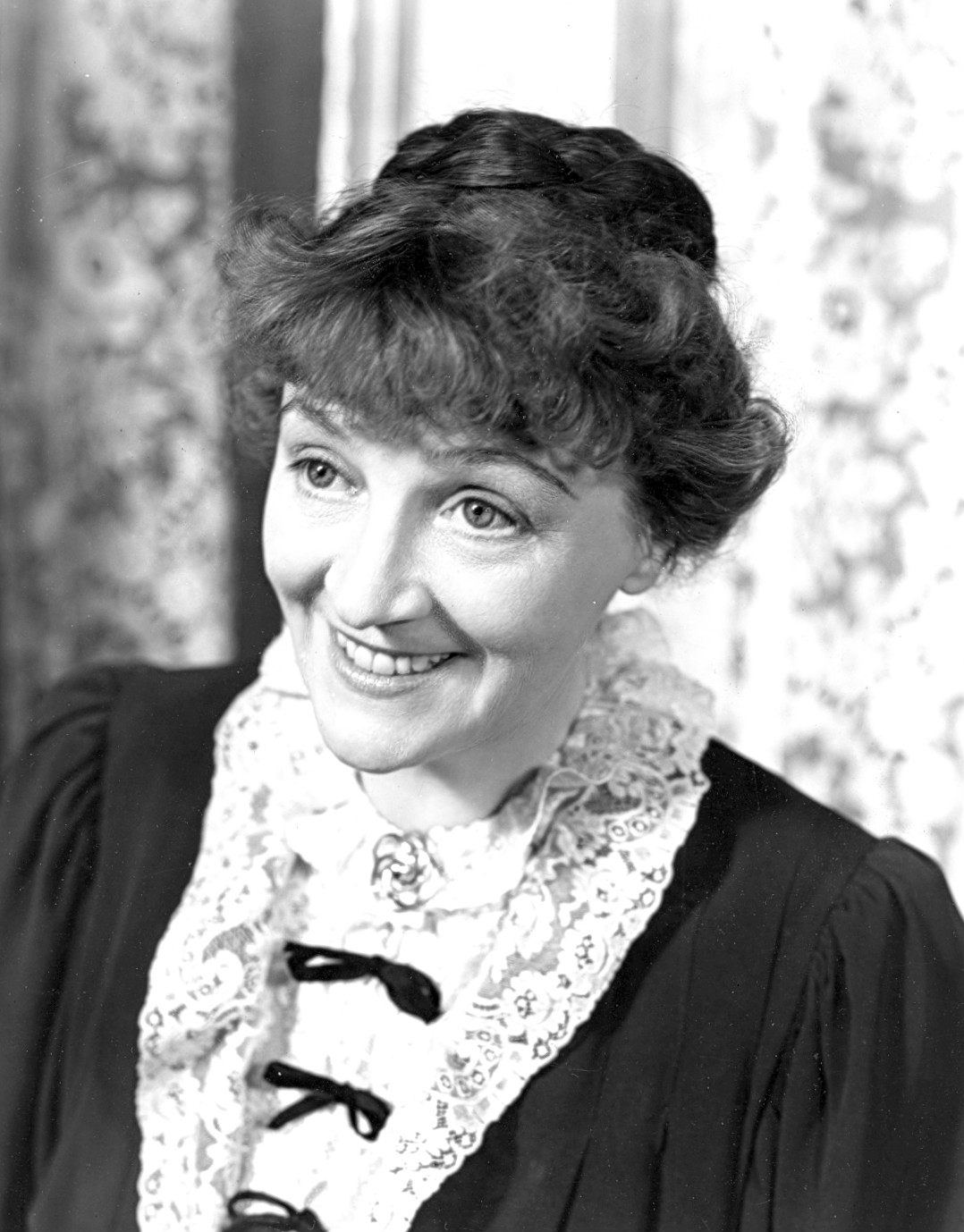
- Collinge in 1941
- Born: Eileen Cecilia Collinge; September 20, 1892
- Died: April 10, 1974 (aged 81); New York City, U.S.
- Resting place: St. Mary's Cemetery; Nantucket, Massachusetts, U.S.
- Occupations: Actress; writer
- Years active: 1904–1967

Eileen Cecilia "Patricia" Collinge (September 20, 1892 – April 10, 1974) was an Irish-American actress and writer. She was best known for her stage appearances, as well as her roles in the films The Little Foxes (1941) and Shadow of a Doubt (1943). She was nominated for an Academy Award and won a NBR Award for the former.

== Stage career ==
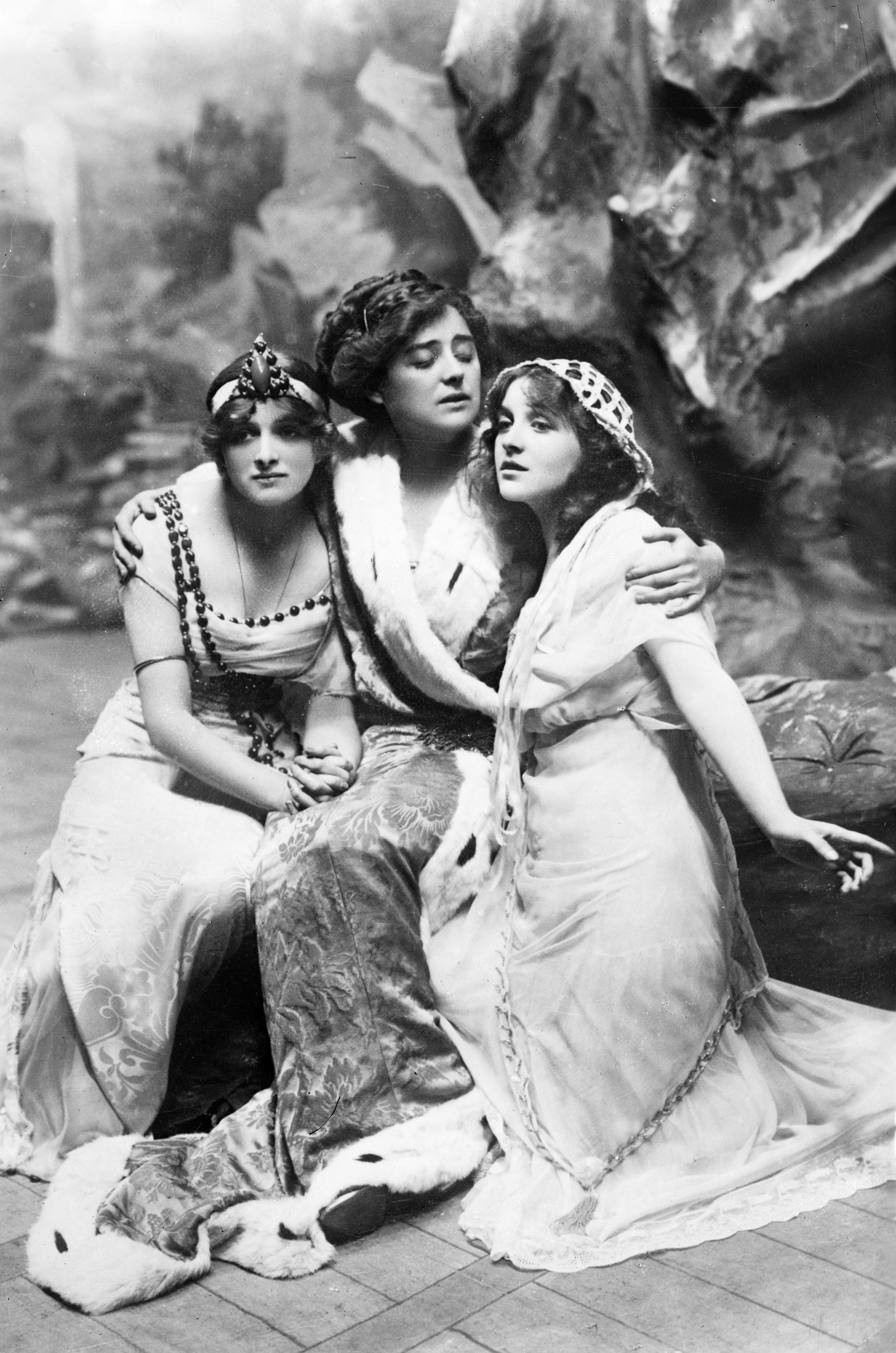
Gladys Cooper, Alexandra Carlisle and Patricia Collinge in the Drury Lane production of Everywoman (1912)

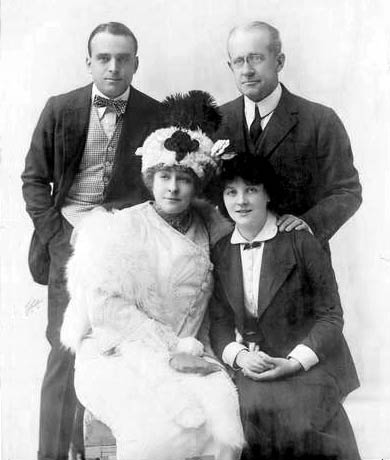
Douglas Fairbanks, William H. Crane, Amelia Bingham, and Patricia Collinge in the Broadway production of The New Henrietta (1913)

Collinge first appeared on the stage in 1904 in Little Black Sambo and Little White Barbara at the Garrick Theatre in London. She immigrated to the United States with her mother in 1907. Soon after, she appeared as a flower girl in The Queens of the Moulin Rouge (1908) and as a supporting player in The Thunderbolt (1910) starring Louis Calvert, which was staged at the New Theatre (Century Theatre).

In 1911, Collinge played Youth in the Broadway production of Everywoman, with Laura Nelson Hall in the title role. She reprised the role in the 1912 London production starring Alexandra Carlisle. She appeared as Agnes with Douglas Fairbanks, Sr., Amelia Bingham, and William H. Crane in The New Henrietta, a play based on a comedy by Bronson Howard, produced at the Knickerbocker Theatre on Broadway in December 1913. In 1914, she again appeared with Fairbanks in He Comes Up Smiling.

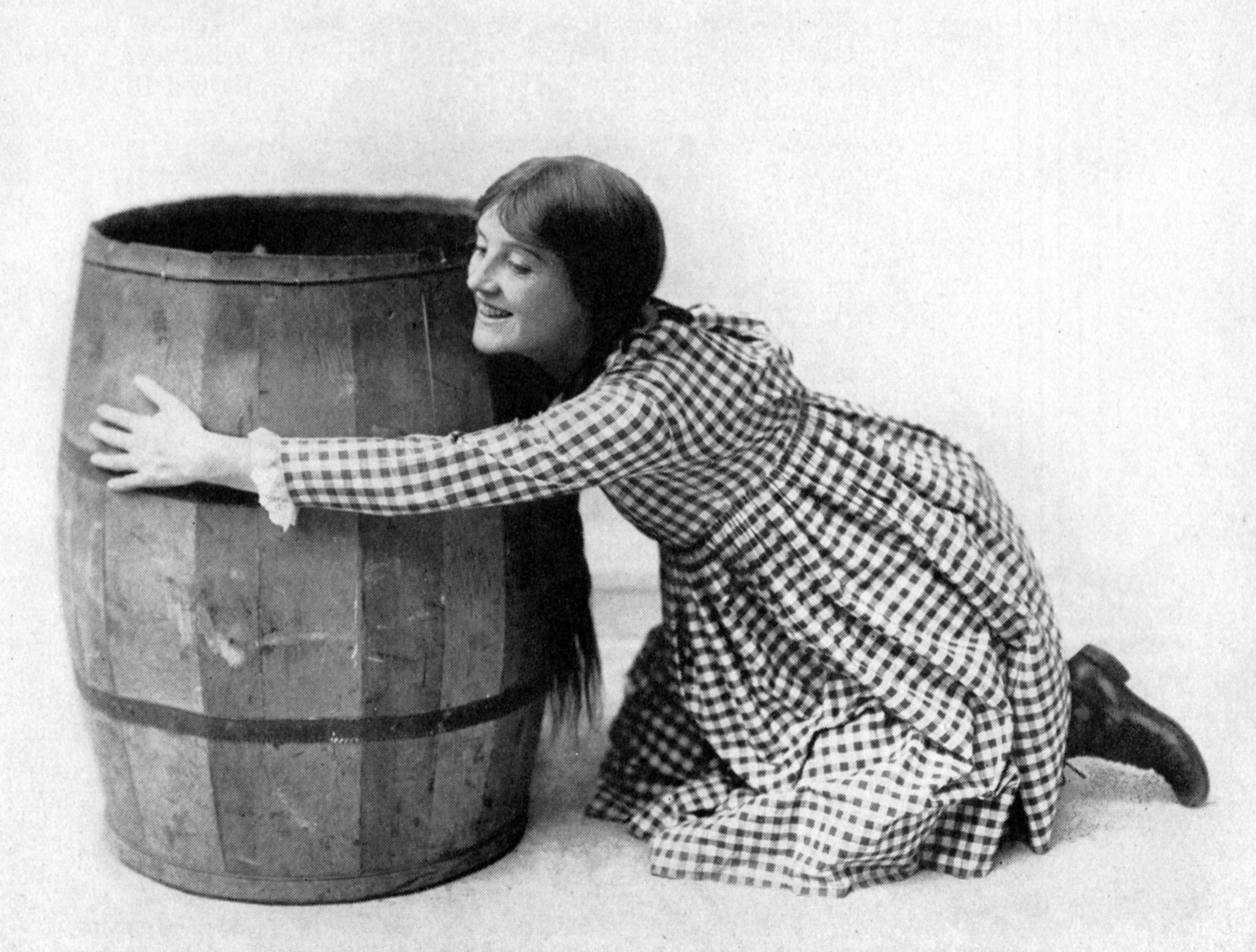
Patricia Collinge in the Broadway production of Pollyanna (1916)

Collinge toured in A Regular Businessman, was the original Pollyanna Whittier in Pollyanna, and toured with Tillie in 1919. In 1932, she appeared in Autumn Crocus. Her acting was acclaimed by a New York Times critic, who wrote, "Miss Collinge plays with the soft, pliant sincerity that makes her one of the most endearing actresses."

She was a member of the original Broadway cast of The Little Foxes with Tallulah Bankhead as the lead in 1939, playing the role of the tragic Birdie Hubbard. In 1941, she played the same part in the motion picture version, which starred Bette Davis. Other stage work included roles in productions of The Heiress, Just Suppose, The Dark Angel, The Importance of Being Earnest, To See Ourselves, and Lady with a Lamp. Her final stage appearance came in December 1952 in I've Got Sixpence at the Ethel Barrymore Theatre.

== Film career ==
Collinge's film debut in 1941's The Little Foxes earned her an Academy Award for Best Supporting Actress nomination. Other films included Shadow of a Doubt (1943), Tender Comrade (1943), and The Nun's Story (1959).

According to the featurette included with the DVD of Shadow of a Doubt, Collinge rewrote the scene that takes place in the garage between Teresa Wright and Macdonald Carey, since Director Alfred Hitchcock and the actors were unhappy with the dialogue. Hitchcock was delighted with her work and used it in the film. She also worked with Alma Reville (Hitchcock's wife) and Ben Hecht on the screenplay for Hitchcock's Lifeboat (1944), which also starred Tallulah Bankhead.

== Television ==
Collinge appeared in four episodes of the popular series Alfred Hitchcock Presents. In one episode, "The Cheney Vase", based on the play Kind Lady, she played a vulnerable, elderly, wealthy woman kept hostage in her own home by ruthless crooks (Darren McGavin and Ruta Lee) attempting to steal a valuable Primitive style vase.

Collinge appeared in two episodes of The Alfred Hitchcock Hour. In one episode, "The Ordeal of Mrs. Snow", she once again played a vulnerable, elderly, wealthy woman. However, in this episode, she is locked inside of a vault and left for dead by her niece's husband after discovering he is a forger. In the other episode, "Bonfire", she plays an elderly woman who is murdered by a preacher (played by Peter Falk) who is after her house.

She also appeared in such television dramas as Laramie (1961), The United States Steel Hour (1962), East Side/West Side (1963), and N.Y.P.D. (1967).

== Author ==
Collinge wrote the play Dame Nature (1938), an adaptation of a French drama by André Birabeau, in addition to some short stories for The New Yorker, and contributed to The New York Times Book Review. She also wrote The Small Mosaics of Mr. and Mrs. Engel, a travelogue that earned her a gold medal from the Italian government, and The B.O.W.S., which she co-authored with Margalo Gillmore.

== Personal life ==
Collinge had no children.

Collinge died on April 10, 1974, in New York City, New York, at the age of 81 of a heart attack. She is buried with her husband at Saint Mary's Cemetery in Nantucket, Massachusetts.

== Filmography ==
Year	Title	Role	Notes
1941	The Little Foxes	Birdie Hubbard	
1943	Shadow of a Doubt	Emma Newton	
1943	Tender Comrade	Helen Stacey	
1944	Casanova Brown	Mrs. Drury	
1951	Teresa	Mrs. Clara Cass (Philip's mother)	
1952	Washington Story	Miss Galbreth	
1951-1953	Studio One		3 episodes
1955	Alfred Hitchcock Presents	Martha Chaney	Season 1 Episode 13: "The Cheney Vase"
1956	Alfred Hitchcock Presents	Julia Pickering	Season 2 Episode 12: "The Rose Garden"
1959	The Nun's Story	Sister William (convent teacher)	
1960	Alfred Hitchcock Presents	Sofie Winter	Season 5 Episode 22: "Across the Threshold"
1961	Alfred Hitchcock Presents	The Landlady	Season 6 Episode 19: "The Landlady"
1962	The Alfred Hitchcock Hour	Naomi Freshwater	Season 1 Episode 13: "Bonfire"
1964	The Alfred Hitchcock Hour	Adelaide Snow	Season 2 Episode 25: "The Ordeal of Mrs. Snow"
1967	N.Y.P.D.	Mrs. Fernig	1 episode, (final appearance)

== Awards and nominations ==
Year	Award	Category	Nominated work	Result
1941	13th National Board of Review Awards	Best Acting	The Little Foxes	Won
1942	14th Academy Awards	Best Supporting Actress	The Little Foxes	Nominated

== Bibliography ==
- Collinge, Patricia (April 4, 1925). "Plots". The New Yorker. 1 (7): 22.
- — (January 2, 1926). "Western Union, please ...". The New Yorker. 1 (46): 30.

== Sources ==
- "All About The Winsome Actress Seen In Tillie". Iowa Citizen. December 29, 1919. p. 6.
- "Many New Plays Bid For Favor". New York Times. November 6, 1910. p. X1.
- "News and Comment of the Stage". New York Times. March 12, 1911. p. X2.
- "Crane at Knickerbocker December 22, 1913". New York Times. December 6, 1913. p. 11.
- "Patricia Collinge, 81, Actress In Many Leading Plays, Dies". New York Times. April 11, 1974. p. 38.
