= Green Grow the Lilacs (play) =

1931 play written by Lynn Riggs

- First edition 1931
- Original language: English
- Written by: Lynn Riggs
- Subject: Love
- Genre: Drama
- Setting: Indian Territory (Oklahoma), 1900

Premiere
- Date: December 8, 1930
- Place: Tremont Theater, Boston

Green Grow the Lilacs is a play by Lynn Riggs.

It had four out-of-town tryouts, playing first at the Tremont Theatre in Boston December 8–20, 1930 then moving to the Garrick Theatre in Philadelphia from December 29, 1930 to January 10, 1931. The production played Ford's Theatre in Baltimore the following week. It then played January 19–24, 1931, at the National Theatre in Washington, D.C. A projected final tryout in Pittsburgh was cancelled, as the play was deemed ready for New York.

It was performed 64 times on Broadway, opening at the Guild Theatre on January 26, 1931, and closing March 21, 1931.

It is the basis of the 1943 musical Oklahoma!, which had a 1955 film adaptation.

== Production ==
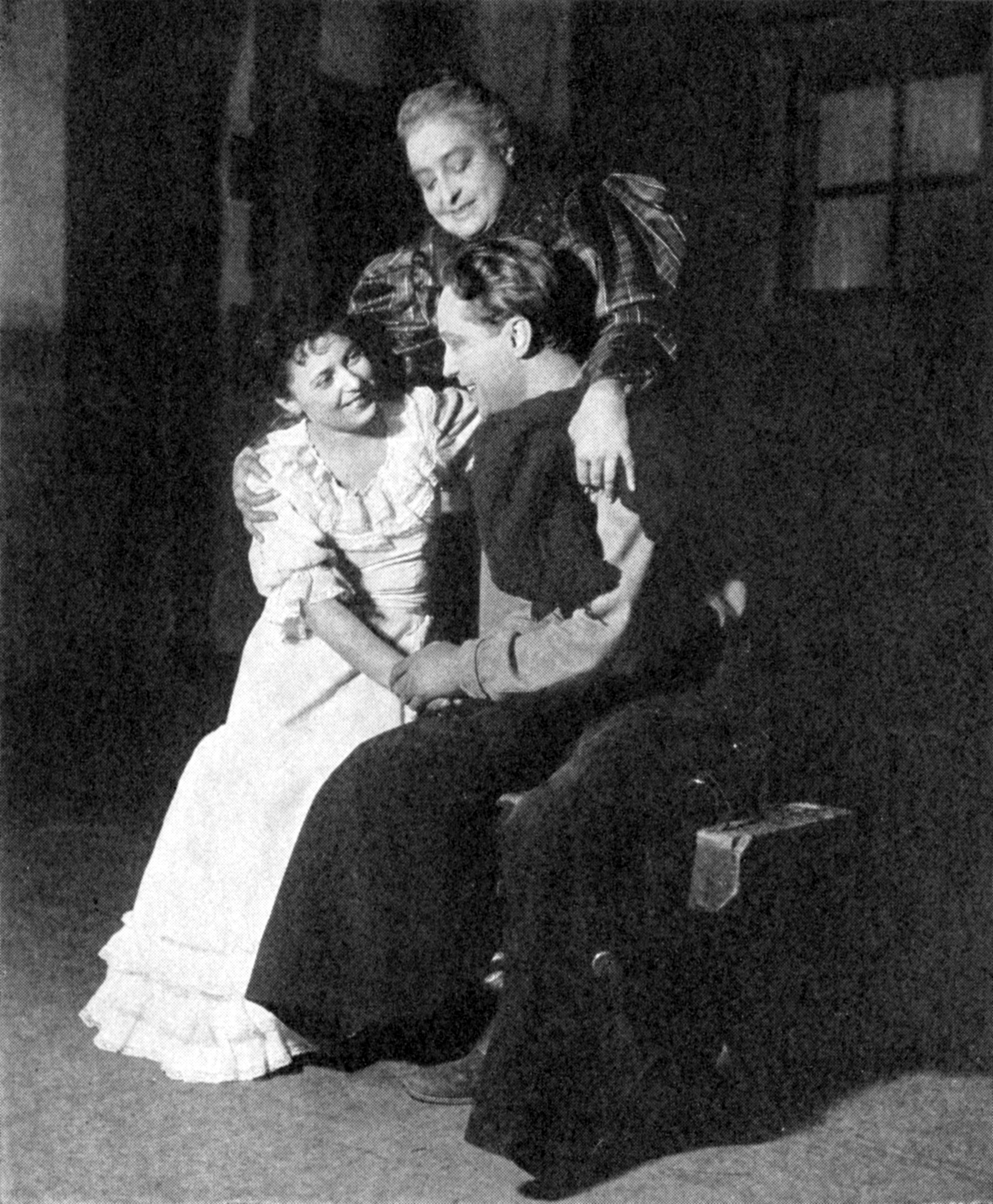
June Walker (Laurey Williams), Helen Westley (Aunt Eller Murphy) and Franchot Tone (Curly McClain) in the original Broadway production of Green Grow the Lilacs (1931)

The play was produced by the Theatre Guild and directed by Herbert J. Biberman. Franchot Tone portrayed cowboy Curly; June Walker was seen as his sweetheart Laurey. Tex Ritter sang four songs in the role of Cord Elam and was the understudy for the lead part as Curly, though he never had occasion to perform in that role. Theatre Guild board member Helen Westley, who had appeared as Mrs. Muskat in the original Broadway production of Ferenc Molnár's Liliom, played Aunt Eller. Lee Strasberg, later to become a teacher of method acting, played the part of the Syrian peddler. The play also toured the Midwest, and appeared at the Dallas Little Theatre during the week of March 7, 1932, and again in Dallas at the Festival of Southwestern Plays, on May 10, 1935.

The 1943 Rodgers and Hammerstein musical play Oklahoma! was based on the Riggs play. It uses newly composed songs in place of the traditional folk songs in Riggs' work, but the plot is largely similar, though the endings are different: unlike the musical, the end of Green Grow the Lilacs is left rather undecided as to Curly's trial for accidentally killing farmhand Jeeter (renamed Jud Fry in the musical). In addition, the cowboy Will Parker is only referred to in the Riggs play and does not actually appear in it; the entire comic subplot involving the fifty dollars that Will must obtain in order to be able to marry Ado Annie is an invention of Hammerstein's.

Green Grow the Lilacs is rarely performed today, while Oklahoma! is a widely acclaimed and popular American musical.

== Characters ==
- Curly McClain
- Aunt Eller Murphy
- Laurey Williams
- Jeeter Fry
- Ado Annie Carnes
- A Syrian Peddler
- Cord Elam
- Old Man Peck

== Setting ==
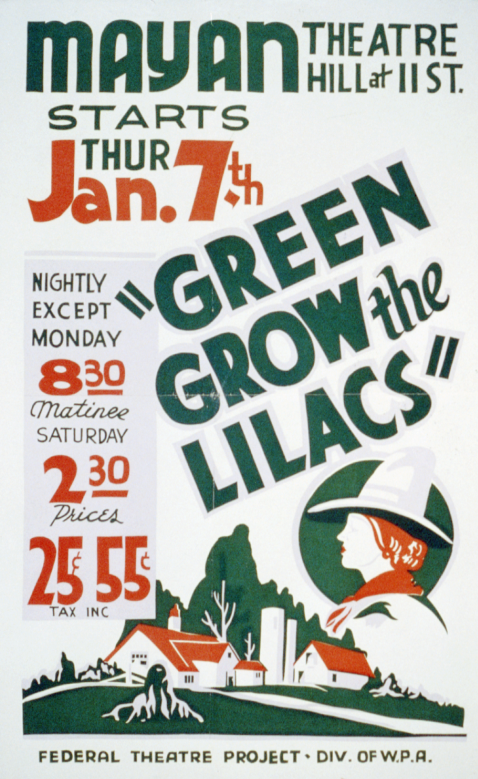
Poster for a 1937 Federal Theatre Project production of Green Grow the Lilacs

Indian Territory, 1900

- Scene 1 — The "front" or living room of the Williams farmhouse, a June morning
- Scene 2 — Laurey's bedroom
- Scene 3 — The smoke house
- Scene 4 — The porch of Old Man Peck's house, that night
- Scene 5 — The hayfield, a month later
- Scene 6 — The "front" room, three nights later
