= Lynn Riggs =

American author, poet, playwright and screenwriter (1899–1954)

- Born: August 31, 1899; Claremore
- Died: June 30, 1954; New York City
- Occupations: Playwright, poet
- Writing career
- Notable work: Green Grow the Lilacs (basis for Oklahoma!)
- Notable awards: Guggenheim Fellowship, Oklahoma Hall of Fame, Hall of Great Westerners

Rollie Lynn Riggs (August 31, 1899 – June 30, 1954) was a Cherokee-American author, poet, playwright and screenwriter. His 1931 play Green Grow the Lilacs was adapted into the musical Oklahoma!.

== Early life ==
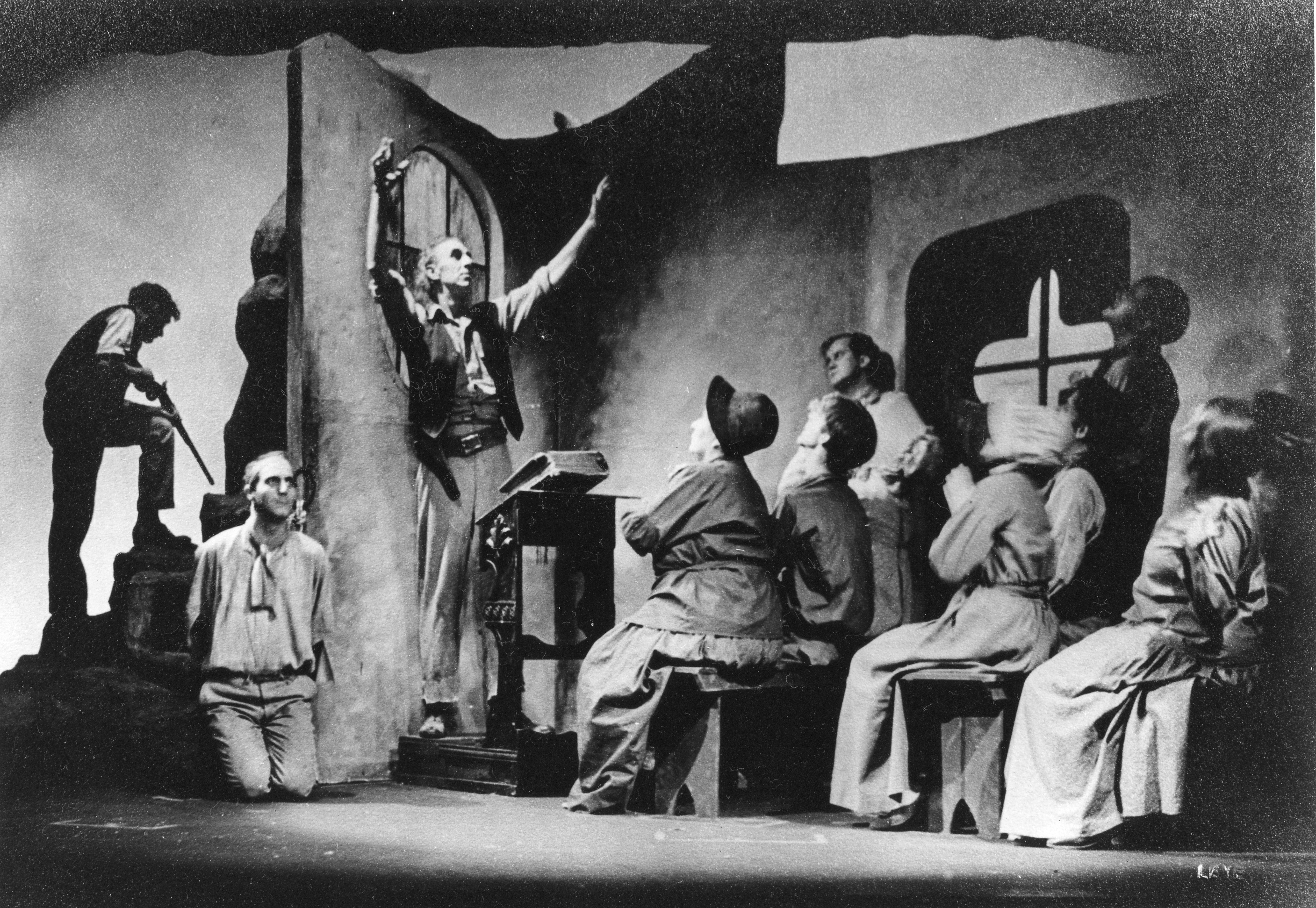
The Cherokee Night by Lynn Riggs, presented at the Provincetown Playhouse by the Community Theatre Division of the Federal Theatre Project, July 1936

Riggs was born on a farm near Claremore, Oklahoma, (then Indian Territory). His mother was 1/8 Cherokee, and when he was two years old, his mother secured his Cherokee allotment for him. He was able to draw on his allotment to help support his writing.

He was educated at the Eastern University Preparatory School in Claremore, Oklahoma, starting in 1912. Riggs graduated from high school in 1917, and travelled to Chicago and New York City. He worked for the Adams Express Company in Chicago, wrote for the Wall Street Journal, sold books at Macy's and swept out Wall Street offices. Returning to Oklahoma in 1919, he wrote for the Oil and Gas Journal. Travelling to Los Angeles, Riggs worked as an extra in the theatre, and a copyeditor at the Los Angeles Times, which published his first poem. Riggs entered the University of Oklahoma in 1920, and taught English there from 1922 to 1923. However, Riggs became ill with tuberculosis during his senior year and did not graduate. Riggs then moved to Santa Fe, New Mexico to improve his health and soon joined a group of artists. However, in 1926 he moved back to New York, hoping to work in the Broadway theatres.

== Literary career ==
Riggs wrote 21 full-length plays, several short stories, poems, and a television script.

His first major production was a one-act play, Knives from Syria, which was produced by the Santa Fe Players in 1925. He began teaching at the Lewis Institute in Chicago, while continuing to write. In 1928 he received a John Simon Guggenheim Fellowship and travelled to Europe. Riggs began writing his most famous play Green Grow the Lilacs in the Café Les Deux Magots on the Left Bank in Paris. He completed this play five months later in Cagnes-sur-Mer, in Southern France.

He then lived in Santa Fe, Los Angeles, and New York, and was a screenwriter for Paramount and Universal Studios. Riggs was homosexual and was often a non-romantic escort for Hollywood actresses including Bette Davis and Joan Crawford.

After serving in the military 1942–1944 he worked on an historical drama for Western Reserve University, published the short story "Eben, The Hound, and the Hare" (1952), and worked on the novel The Affair at Easter, set in Oklahoma.

He moved to Shelter Island, New York after he started receiving a steady income when Green Grow the Lilacs was adapted into Oklahoma! in 1943.

Riggs was inducted into the Oklahoma Hall of Fame in 1943, and in 1965 he was inducted into the Hall of Great Westerners of the National Cowboy and Western Heritage Museum.

== Death and legacy ==
Riggs died on June 30, 1954, of stomach cancer in New York City. He was buried in Claremore, Oklahoma, where at his funeral the governor had a state flag laid over his coffin. This marked the first instance of this state honor in Oklahoma. Claremore, Oklahoma is home to the Lynn Riggs Memorial.

His home in Santa Fe at 770 Acequia Madre Road is listed on the National Register of Historic Places as a contributing building in the Camino del Monte Sol Historic District. He is further memorialized by the Lynn Riggs Black Box Theater, located in Oklahoma and named in his honor.

== Plays ==
Selected plays include:

- Knives from Syria (premiered 1925, published 1927)
- Big Lake (premiered 1927, published 1927)
- Sump'n Like Wings (premiered 1931, published 1928)
- A Lantern to See By (premiered 1925, published 1928)
- Rancor (premiered 1928)
- Roadside (premiered 1930, published 1930)
- Green Grow the Lilacs (premiered 1931, published 1931)
- The Cherokee Night (premiered 1932, published 1936)
- More Sky (1934)
- Russet Mantle (1936)
- A Year of Pilar (1938)
- A World Elsewhere (1939)
- The Cream in the Well (1940)
- Dark Encounter (1944)
- Toward the Western Sky (premiered 1951)

His first play was Cuckoo in 1920, a farce about college fraternities that was performed at the University of Oklahoma in the spring of 1921. The Theatre Guild produced his Green Grow the Lilacs on Broadway in 1931, where it ran for 64 performances. The musical Oklahoma!, based on Riggs' play, opened on Broadway on March 31, 1943, and ran until May 29, 1948, for 2,212 performances.

== Filmography ==
- The Siren Song (1930)
- Beyond Victory (1931, uncredited)
- Laughing Boy (1934, uncredited)
- Stingaree (1934)
- Family Man (1934)
- Andrew's Harvest (1934)
- A Wicked Woman (1934, uncredited)
- The Garden of Allah (1936)
- The Plainsman (1936)
- Sherlock Holmes and the Voice of Terror (1942)
- Destination Unknown (1942)
- Madame Spy (1942)
- Sherlock Holmes in Washington (1943)

== Sources ==
- Oklahoma Department of Libraries
