= Kind Lady (play) =

- Original language: English
- Written by: Edward Chodorov
- Genre: Melodrama, Mystery/Thriller
- Setting: London

Premiere
- Date: 1935
- Place: Booth Theatre

Kind Lady is a play written by Edward Chodorov and first performed on stage in 1935 (on April 23). It was based in part on a short story called The Silver Mask by Hugh Walpole. It was produced frequently on the summer theater circuit. The play has been adapted for film twice by MGM: as the December 1935 film Kind Lady and the 1951 film Kind Lady.

== Characters and plot ==
An elderly, aristocratic woman living in London is victimized by a team of diabolically clever con artists. They initially play on her sympathy to gain her trust, then manage to alienate her family and friends, nearly convincing them that she has lost her mind. They manage to then lock her in her bedroom, selling off her furniture and paintings all the while from the rest of her apartment. The protagonist nearly loses both her property and her sanity, but exerts a supreme effort of courage and skill in this intense battle of wits.

== Production history ==
The original production of Kind Lady was on Broadway at the Booth Theatre in New York City, New York, with a cast that starred Grace George and Henry Daniell, with Florence Britton, Francis Compton, among others.

== Film and television adaptations ==
Kind Lady was produced into film by MGM in 1935 starring Aline MacMahon and Basil Rathbone (released in Great Britain as House of Menace). A second film version was made by MGM in 1951 and directed by John Sturges. It starred Ethel Barrymore, Maurice Evans, Keenan Wynn and Angela Lansbury.

Kind Lady was made for television twice: in a 1949 production on The Ford Theatre Hour and in a 1953 episode of Broadway Television Theatre.

== See also ==
- Kind Lady (1951)
- Kind Lady (1935)
