= Kind Lady (1951 film) =

1951 film by John Sturges

- Theatrical release poster
- Directed by: John Sturges
- Screenplay by: Jerry Davis; Edward Chodorov; Charles Bennett
- Based on: The Silver Mask; 1932 story by Hugh Walpole; 1935 play by Edward Chodorov
- Produced by: Armand Deutsch
- Starring: Ethel Barrymore; Maurice Evans
- Cinematography: Joseph Ruttenberg
- Edited by: Ferris Webster
- Music by: David Raksin
- Production company: Metro-Goldwyn-Mayer
- Distributed by: Loew's Inc.
- Release date: June 20, 1951
- Running time: 78 minutes
- Country: United States
- Language: English
- Budget: $911,000
- Box office: $500,000

Kind Lady is a 1951 American Metro-Goldwyn-Mayer crime film noir directed by John Sturges and starring Ethel Barrymore, Maurice Evans, Keenan Wynn and Angela Lansbury. The film is remake of the 1935 film of the same name that stars Aline MacMahon in the title role.

== Plot ==
Mary Herries is a rich old lady who lives in Edwardian London, with two female servants, and surrounded by valuable furniture and works of art. Painter Henry Elcott tricks her into permitting him, his wife Ada and their baby to live in her home after Ada collapses and a doctor claims that she should not be moved. Elcott's accomplices, Mr. and Mrs. Edwards, become the butler and maid. Elcott schemes to sell Mrs. Herries' art collection and her other possessions while holding her and her housemaid Rose captive in their bedrooms. To visitors, Elcott masquerades as the nephew of Mrs. Herries who has come to tend to her affairs after a sudden mental breakdown.

The criminals taunt Mrs. Herries, placing her chair near a window after informing the neighborhood that any screams emanating from the house would be those of an insane woman. Mrs. Edwards is concerned that they are staying too long in the house, which Elcott intends to sell. Mrs. Herries tries to bribe Mrs. Edwards, but Mr. Edwards snatches the money from his wife and refuses to leave. Tensions rise as Mrs. Herries learns the true identity of Elcott from a portrait of his wife that he had signed with his real name. Ada has seen Elcott kill before and realizes that he will kill again. She tries but is unable to free Rose, who is impulsively killed by Mr. Edwards.

When the time comes to leave the house, Mr. Edwards approaches Mrs. Herries to push her out of the window, attempting to suggest suicide. However, the body in the chair has been switched by Mrs. Herries and Ada and is actually that of Rose. The police arrive and Elcott realizes that he and Mr. and Mrs. Edwards have made a fatal mistake.

== Cast ==
- Ethel Barrymore as Mary Herries
- Maurice Evans as Henry Springer Elcott
- Angela Lansbury as Mrs. Edwards
- Keenan Wynn as Edwards
- Betsy Blair as Ada Elcott
- John Williams as Mr. Foster
- Doris Lloyd as Rose
- John O'Malley as Antique Dealer
- Henri Letondal as Monsieur Malaquaise
- Moyna Macgill as Mrs. Harkley
- Barry Bernard as Mr. Harkley
- Sally Cooper as Lucy Weston
- Arthur Gould-Porter as Chauffeur
- Sherlee Collier as Aggie Edwards
- Phyllis Mooris as Dora
- Patrick O'Moore as Constable Orkin
- Keith McConnell as Jones
- Leonard Carey as Postman
- Victor Wood as Doc

== Production ==
MGM announced the film project in March 1950, with Ethel Barrymore slated as the star. MGM hired Edward Chodorov, who had written the stage play Kind Lady with George Haight, to write the screen adaptation. The play had been based on the story "The Silver Mask" by Hugh Walpole.

== Reception ==
In a contemporary review for The New York Times, critic A. H. Weiler wrote: "Although remakes sometimes have borne the stigma of staleness, 'Kind Lady' ... should dispel the notion that second editions are not equal to the original. For this yarn about a gang of knaves who hold a trusting elderly lady captive while they attempt to snatch her worldly goods is literate melodrama impeccably translated by a fine cast. And since it has been sixteen years since it first saw the light of day on Broadway, it is in order to point out that the present company is as convincing as were the troupes who originated it on the stage and, some months later, on the screen."

According to MGM records, the film earned $361,000 in the U.S. and Canada and $139,000 in other markets, resulting in a loss to the studio of $664,000.
