= Edward Chodorov =

American dramatist

- Born: March 17, 1904; New York City
- Died: October 9, 1988 (aged 84); New York City
- Relatives: Jerome Chodorov, brother

Edward Chodorov (April 17, 1904 – October 9, 1988), was a Broadway playwright, and the writer or producer of over 50 motion pictures.

== Filmography ==
- Kind Lady (1951, writer)
- Road House (1948, writer/producer)
- The Hucksters (1947, writer)
- Undercurrent (1946, writer)
- The Man from Dakota (1940, producer)
- A Hundred to One (1939, producer)
- Rich Man, Poor Girl (1938, producer)
- Spring Madness (1938, writer/producer)
- Woman Against Woman (1938, writer/producer)
- Yellow Jack (1938, writer)
- The Devil Is Driving (1937, producer)
- The Devil's Playground (1937, associate producer)
- The League of Frightened Men (1937, writer/producer)
- Craig's Wife (1936, associate producer)
- Kind Lady (1935, writer)
- Madame Du Barry (1934, writer)
- The World Changes (1933, writer)
- Captured! (1933, writer/producer)
- The Mayor of Hell (1933, writer)

Uncredited

- The Story of Louis Pasteur (1936, writer)
- Snowed Under (1936, contributor)

== Bibliography ==
=== Plays ===
- Oh, Men! Oh, Women! (1953), later adapted into a 1957 film
- Common Ground (1945)
- Decision (1944)
- Those Endearing Young Charms (1943)
- Cue for Passion (1940) with H. S. Kraft
- Kind Lady (1935, writer)
- Wonder Boy (1931) with Arthur Barton

== Blacklist ==
Chodorov was blacklisted in 1953 by Hollywood studios for his failure to cooperate with the House Committee on Un-American Activities. He was identified as a Communist Party member by Jerome Robbins.
