= Kind Lady (1935 film) =

1935 film by George B. Seitz

- Theatrical release poster
- Directed by: George B. Seitz
- Written by: Bernard Schubert
- Based on: Kind Lady; 1935 play by Edward Chodorov; The Silver Mask; 1932 story by Hugh Walpole
- Produced by: Lucien Hubbard
- Starring: Aline MacMahon; Basil Rathbone; Mary Carlisle
- Cinematography: George J. Folsey
- Edited by: Hugh Wynn
- Music by: Edward Ward
- Production company: Metro-Goldwyn-Mayer
- Distributed by: Metro-Goldwyn-Mayer
- Release date: December 6, 1935
- Running time: 76 minutes
- Country: United States
- Language: English

Kind Lady is a 1935 American drama film directed by George B. Seitz starring Aline MacMahon, Basil Rathbone and Mary Carlisle. It is based on the play of the same name by Edward Chodorov and a short story called The Silver Mask by Hugh Walpole.

Doris Lloyd appeared in this film and its 1951 remake of the same name in different roles.

== Plot ==
Wealthy and charitable Mary Herries (Aline MacMahon) is tricked by aspiring artist Henry Abbott (Basil Rathbone) into letting him and ill wife Ada (Justine Chase) stay in her stately home.

When he invites friends Mr. and Mrs. Edwards (Dudley Digges and Eily Malyon) to pay a visit, they overstay their welcome as well. Days turn into weeks, making Mary and housemaid Rose (Nola Luxford) increasingly anxious for everyone to leave.

It turns out to be a plot masterminded by the silky and sinister Abbott to steal everything Mary owns. He masquerades as a relative and they as her butler and maid, holding Mary and Rose captive in their rooms. Outsiders are told that Mary has gone on holiday to America and won't return for a long time.

The plot thickens as Rose is killed. The suspicions of Mary's nephew, Peter Santard, are confirmed when no record of Mary applying for a passport can be found. The police arrive just in time to save her and place Abbott under arrest.

== Cast ==
- Aline MacMahon as Mary Herries
- Basil Rathbone as Henry Abbott
- Mary Carlisle as Phyllis
- Frank Albertson as Peter Santard
- Dudley Digges as Mr. Edwards
- Doris Lloyd as Lucy Weston
- Nola Luxford as Rose
- Murray Kinnell as Doctor
- Eily Malyon as Mrs. Edwards
- Justine Chase as Ada Abbott
- Barbara Shields as Aggie Edwards
- Donald Meek as Mr. Foster
- Frank Reicher as Gustave Roubet (as Frank Reigher)

== Critical reception ==
Harrison's Reports described the film as a "melodrama ... too horrifying for sensitive people." Lionel Collier, writing for the British magazine, Picturegoer, gave the film a one-star review and wrote, "While there is ingenuity in the main theme of this picture, the development is too vague and fantastic to carry much thrill or interest." He wrote that the film’s main assets were its stars Basil Rathbone and Aline MacMahon, commenting of the latter that "hers is a touching and poignant characterisation which moves one in spite of the story weaknesses."
