= 48th Tony Awards =

1994 US theatrical awards ceremony

- Official poster for the 48th annual Tony Awards
- Date: June 12, 1994
- Location: Gershwin Theatre, New York City, New York
- Hosted by: Sir Anthony Hopkins; Amy Irving
- Most wins: Carousel (5)
- Most nominations: Passion (10)

Television/radio coverage
- Network: CBS

The 48th Annual Tony Awards were held on June 12, 1994, to recognize excellence in Broadway productions during the 1993-94 season. The ceremony was broadcast by CBS from the Gershwin Theatre on June 12, 1994. The hosts were Sir Anthony Hopkins and Amy Irving.

== Eligibility ==
Shows that opened on Broadway during the 1993–1994 season before May 12, 1994 are eligible.

This was the first year for several awards: the award for Best Revival was given separately for plays and musicals, and the "Lifetime Achievement Award". The first Lifetime Achievement Award was presented to husband-and-wife Jessica Tandy and Hume Cronyn by another husband-and-wife, Ossie Davis and Ruby Dee.

Original plays

- Angels in America: Perestroika
- Any Given Day
- Broken Glass
- The Kentucky Cycle
- Laughter on the 23rd Floor
- Mixed Emotions
- The Rise and Fall of Little Voice
- Sally Marr... and Her Escorts
- Twilight: Los Angeles, 1992
- The Twilight of the Golds
- Wonderful Tennessee

Original musicals

- Beauty and the Beast
- The Best Little Whorehouse Goes Public
- Cyrano: The Musical
- A Grand Night for Singing
- Passion
- The Red Shoes

Play revivals

- Abe Lincoln in Illinois
- An Inspector Calls
- The Flowering Peach
- The Government Inspector
- In the Summer House
- Medea
- No Man's Land
- Picnic
- Timon of Athens
- White Liars & Black Comedy

Musical revivals

- Camelot
- Carousel
- Damn Yankees
- Grease
- Joseph and the Amazing Technicolor Dreamcoat
- My Fair Lady
- She Loves Me

== Presenters ==
George Abbott, Alan Alda, Jane Alexander, Carol Burnett, Nell Carter, Glenn Close, Tony Danza, Ossie Davis, Ruby Dee, Peter Falk, Melanie Griffith, Madeline Kahn, Harvey Keitel, Jack Klugman, Swoosie Kurtz, Linda Lavin, Michael Learned, Steve Martin, Bebe Neuwirth, Rosie O'Donnell, Bernadette Peters, Tony Randall, Tony Roberts, Martin Short, Paul Sorvino, Jean Stapleton, Marlo Thomas, Gwen Verdon, Vanessa L. Williams

== Performances ==
=== Opening Number ===
Victor Garber introduced performances from the 1994 nominees for Best Revival of a Musical:

- Grease ("We Go Together" – Company)
- She Loves Me ("I Don't Know His Name"/"She Loves Me" – Diane Fratantoni, Sally Mayes and Boyd Gaines)
- Damn Yankees ("Shoeless Joe From Hannibal, Mo." – Vicki Lewis and Company)
- Carousel ("You'll Never Walk Alone"- Shirley Verrett and Company)
- Vanessa L. Williams on live remote from Toronto introduced Show Boat ("Ol' Man River" – Michel Bell and Company)

=== Musicals represented ===
- A Grand Night for Singing ("People Will Say We're in Love"/"Some Enchanted Evening"/"It's a Grand Night for Singing" – Company)
- Beauty and the Beast ("Me"/"Be Our Guest"/"If I Can't Love Her"/"Beauty and the Beast" – Company)
- Cyrano: The Musical (Company)
- Passion ("Happiness"/"Drums and Music"/"Finale" – Company)

== Winners and nominees ==
=== Competitive Awards ===
Winners are in bold

Best Play	Best Musical
**Angels in America: Perestroika – Tony Kushner**; Broken Glass – Arthur Miller; The Kentucky Cycle – Robert Schenkkan; Twilight: Los Angeles, 1992 – Anna Deavere Smith	**Passion**; Beauty and the Beast; Cyrano: The Musical; A Grand Night for Singing
Best Revival of a Play	Best Revival of a Musical
**An Inspector Calls**; Abe Lincoln in Illinois; Medea; Timon of Athens	**Carousel**; Damn Yankees; Grease; She Loves Me
Best Performance by a Leading Actor in a Play	Best Performance by a Leading Actress in a Play
**Stephen Spinella – Angels in America: Perestroika as Prior Walter**; Brian Bedford – Timon of Athens as Timon; Christopher Plummer – No Man's Land as Spooner; Sam Waterston – Abe Lincoln in Illinois as Abraham Lincoln	**Diana Rigg – Medea as Medea**; Nancy Marchand – Black Comedy as Mrs. Furnival/Sophie; Joan Rivers – Sally Marr... and Her Escorts as Sally Marr; Anna Deavere Smith – Twilight: Los Angeles, 1992 as Various Characters
Best Performance by a Leading Actor in a Musical	Best Performance by a Leading Actress in a Musical
**Boyd Gaines – She Loves Me as Georg Nowack**; Victor Garber – Damn Yankees as Mr. Applegate; Terrence Mann – Beauty and the Beast as The Beast; Jere Shea – Passion as Giorgio	**Donna Murphy – Passion as Fosca**; Susan Egan – Beauty and the Beast as Belle; Dee Hoty – The Best Little Whorehouse Goes Public as Mona Stangley; Judy Kuhn – She Loves Me as Amalia Balash
Best Performance by a Featured Actor in a Play	Best Performance by a Featured Actress in a Play
**Jeffrey Wright – Angels in America: Perestroika as Belize/Various Characters**; Larry Bryggman – Picnic as Howard Bevans; David Marshall Grant – Angels in America: Perestroika as Joe Pitt/Various Characters; Gregory Itzin – The Kentucky Cycle as Various Characters	**Jane Adams – An Inspector Calls as Sheila Birling**; Debra Monk – Picnic as Rosemary Sydney; Jeanne Paulsen – The Kentucky Cycle as Various Characters; Anne Pitoniak – Picnic as Helen Potts
Best Performance by a Featured Actor in a Musical	Best Performance by a Featured Actress in a Musical
**Jarrod Emick – Damn Yankees as Joe Hardy**; Tom Aldredge – Passion as Dr. Tambourri; Gary Beach – Beauty and the Beast as Lumière; Jonathan Freeman – She Loves Me as Headwaiter	**Audra McDonald – Carousel as Carrie Pipperidge Snow**; Marcia Lewis – Grease as Miss Lynch; Sally Mayes – She Loves Me as Ilona Ritter; Marin Mazzie – Passion as Clara
Best Book of a Musical	Best Original Score (Music and/or Lyrics) Written for the Theatre
**James Lapine – Passion**; Walter Bobbie – A Grand Night for Singing; Linda Woolverton – Beauty and the Beast; Koen van Dijk – Cyrano: The Musical	**Passion – Stephen Sondheim (music and lyrics)**; Beauty and the Beast – Alan Menken (music) and Howard Ashman and Tim Rice (lyrics); Cyrano: The Musical – Ad van Dijk (music) and Koen van Dijk, Peter Reeves, and Sheldon Harnick (lyrics)
Best Scenic Design	Best Costume Design
**Bob Crowley – Carousel**; Peter J. Davidson – Medea; Ian MacNeil – An Inspector Calls; Tony Walton – She Loves Me	**Ann Hould-Ward – Beauty and the Beast**; David Charles and Jane Greenwood – She Loves Me; Jane Greenwood – Passion; Yan Tax – Cyrano: The Musical
Best Lighting Design	Best Choreography
**Rick Fisher – An Inspector Calls**; Beverly Emmons – Passion; Jules Fisher – Angels in America: Perestroika; Natasha Katz – Beauty and the Beast	**Sir Kenneth MacMillan – Carousel**; Jeff Calhoun – Grease; Rob Marshall – Damn Yankees; Rob Marshall – She Loves Me
Best Direction of a Play	Best Direction of a Musical
**Stephen Daldry – An Inspector Calls**; Gerald Gutierrez – Abe Lincoln in Illinois; Michael Langham – Timon of Athens; George C. Wolfe – Angels in America: Perestroika	**Nicholas Hytner – Carousel**; Scott Ellis – She Loves Me; James Lapine – Passion; Robert Jess Roth – Beauty and the Beast

=== Non-Competitive Awards ===
- Regional Theatre Award — McCarter Theatre
- Lifetime Achievement Award — Jessica Tandy and Hume Cronyn

== Multiple nominations and awards ==
These productions had multiple nominations:

- 10 nominations: Passion
- 9 nominations: Beauty and the Beast and She Loves Me
- 6 nominations: Angels in America: Perestroika
- 5 nominations: Carousel and An Inspector Calls
- 4 nominations: Cyrano: The Musical and Damn Yankees
- 3 nominations: Abe Lincoln in Illinois, Grease, The Kentucky Cycle, Medea, Picnic and Timon of Athens
- 2 nominations: A Grand Night for Singing and Twilight: Los Angeles, 1992

The following productions received multiple awards.

- 5 wins: Carousel
- 4 wins: An Inspector Calls and Passion
- 3 wins: Angels in America: Perestroika

== See also ==
- Drama Desk Awards
- 1994 Laurence Olivier Awards – equivalent awards for West End theatre productions
- Obie Award
- New York Drama Critics' Circle
- Theatre World Award
- Lucille Lortel Awards
