= Clarence Derwent Awards =

UK & US theatre acting awards established 1945

The Clarence Derwent Awards are theatre awards given annually by the Actors' Equity Association on Broadway in the United States and by Equity, the performers' union, in the West End in the United Kingdom.

Clarence Derwent (23 March 1884 – 6 August 1959) was an English actor, director, and manager. He was educated at St Paul's School, London and the Birkbeck Institute. He joined Sir Frank Benson's stage company, with whom he stayed for five years. He then joined Annie Horniman's repertory company in Manchester. He was seen in a great variety of roles, both in London and New York. He made his last appearance on stage in 1948 in The Madwoman of Chaillot. He died in New York at the age of 75.

From 1946 to 1952 Derwent was President of America's Actors' Equity. His will stipulated that two $500 prizes were to be given out annually to the best individual male and female supporting performances on Broadway and a £100 prize to the best supporting performances in the West End. So that Derwent could have the gratification of seeing the awards given out, they were started in America in 1945 and in the UK in 1948. The prizes in the US are now $2,000 and an engraved crystal trophy.

In the United Kingdom, Equity introduced Student awards in 2006. Equity has not resumed giving out supporting performance or student awards since 'pausing' them in 2020.

== Most promising male (US) ==
Source: US winners

=== 1940s ===
Year	Actor	Show	Character
1945	Frederick O'Neal	Anna Lucasta	Frank
1946	Paul Douglas	Born Yesterday	Herry Brock
1947	Tom Ewell	John Loves Mary	Fred Taylor
1948	Lou Gilbert	Hope Is the Thing with Feathers	Charlie
1949	Ray Walston	Summer and Smoke	Traveling Salesman

=== 1950s ===
Year	Actor	Show	Character
1950	Douglass Watson	Wisteria Trees	Peter Whitfield
1951	Frederic Warriner	Getting Married	Reverend De Soames
1951	Logan Ramsey	High Ground	Willie Pentridge
1952	Iggie Wolfington	Mrs. McThing	Chef
1953	David J. Stewart	Camino Real	The Baron
1954	David Lewis	King of Hearts	Joe Wicks
1955	Fritz Weaver	The White Devil	Flaminero
1956	Gerald Hiken	Uncle Vanya	Telegen
1957	Ellis Rabb	The Misanthrope	Alceste
1958	George C. Scott	Richard III	Richard III
1959	David Hurst	Look After Lulu!	Police Inspector

=== 1960s ===
Year	Actor	Show(	Character
1960	William Daniels	The Zoo Story	Peter
1961	Eric Christmas	Little Moon of Alba	Rector Olive
1962	Gene Wilder	The Complaisant Lover	Hotel Valet
1963	Gene Hackman	Children from Their Games	Charles Widgin Rochambeau
1964	Richard McMurray	A Case of Libel	Fred Alston
1965	Jaime Sánchez	Conerico Was Here to Stay	Jesus
1966	Christopher Walken	The Lion in Winter	Philip II of France
1966	Tom Ahearne (special citation)	Hogan's Goat	Edward Quinn
1967	Austin Pendleton	Hail Scrawdyke!	Irwin Ingham
1967	Philip Bosco (special citation)	The Alchemist	Lincoln Center Rep
1968	David Birney	Summertree	Troubled Youth
1969	Ron O'Neal	No Place to Be Somebody	Gabe Gabriel

=== 1970s ===
Year	Actor	Show	Character
1970	Jeremiah Sullivan	A Scent of Flowers	Gravedigger
1971	James Woods	Saved	Lenny
1972	Richard Backus	Promenade, All!	Willie/Wesley/Walter/Wendall
1973	Christopher Murney	Tricks	Sylvestre
1974	Thom Christopher	Noël Coward in Two Keys	Felix
1975	Reyno	The First Breeze of Summer	Lou Edwards
1976	Peter Evans	Streamers	Richie
1977	Barry Preston	Bubbling Brown Sugar	Charlie/Count
1978	Morgan Freeman	The Mighty Gents	Zeke
1979	Richard Cox	Platinum	Dan Danger

=== 1980s ===
Year	Actor	Show	Character
1980	Eric Peterson	Billy Bishop Goes to War	Billy Bishop
1981	Bob Gunton	How I Got That Story	The Historical Event
1982	Larry Riley	A Soldier's Play	Pvt. C.J. Memphis
1983	John Malkovich	True West	Lee
1984	Peter Gallagher	The Real Thing	Billy
1985	Bill Sadler	Biloxi Blues	Sgt. Merwin J. Toomey
1986	John Mahoney	The House of Blue Leaves	Artie Shaughnessy
1987	Courtney B. Vance	Fences	Cory Maxson
1988	BD Wong	M. Butterfly	Song Liling
1989	John Pankow	Aristocrats	Eamon

=== 1990s ===
Year	Actor(s)	Show(s)	Character
1990	Michael Jeter	Grand Hotel	Otto Kringelein
1991	Danny Gerard	Lost in Yonkers	Arty
1991	James McDaniel	Six Degrees of Separation	Paul Poitier
1992	Patrick Fitzgerald	Grandchild of Kings	Sean O'Casey
1993	Joe Mantello	Angels in America	Louis Ironson
1994	Robert Stanton	All in the Timing	Various roles
1995	Billy Crudup	Arcadia	Septimus Hodge
1996	Ruben Santiago-Hudson	Seven Guitars	Canewell
1997	Alan Tudyk	Bunny Bunny	Various roles
1998	Sam Trammell	Ah, Wilderness!	Richard Miller
1999	Robert Sella	Side Man	Clifford

=== 2000s ===
Year	Actor(s)	Show(s)	Character
2000	Derek Smith	The Green Bird	Tartaglia
2000	Derek Smith	King John	Philip Faulconbridge
2001	David Burtka	The Play About the Baby	The Boy
2002	Sam Robards	The Man Who Had All the Luck	Gustav Eberson
2003	Denis O'Hare	Take Me Out	Mason Marzac
2004	John Tartaglia	Avenue Q	Princeton/Rod
2005	Christian Borle	Spamalot	Historian/Not Dead Fred/French Guard/Minstrel/Prince Herbert
2006	Jason Ritter	Third	Woodson Bull III
2007	Lin-Manuel Miranda	In the Heights	Usnavi de la Vega
2008	Michael Esper	Crazy Mary	Skip
2009	Aaron Tveit	Next to Normal	Gabe Goodman

=== 2010s ===
Year	Actor(s)	Show(s)	Character
2010	Bill Heck	The Orphans' Home Cycle	Horace Robedaux/Paul Horace Robedaux
2011	Santino Fontana	The Importance of Being Earnest	Algernon Moncrieff
2012	Finn Wittrock	Death of a Salesman	Happy Loman
2013	Michael Urie	Buyer & Cellar	Alex More
2014	Steven Boyer	Hand to God	Jason/Tyrone
2015	Josh Grisetti	It Shoulda Been You	Marty Kaufman
2016	Ben Platt	Dear Evan Hansen	Evan Hansen
2017	Will Pullen	Sweat	Jason
2018	Sean Carvajal	Jesus Hopped the 'A' Train	Angel Cruz
2019	Ephraim Sykes	Ain't Too Proud	David Ruffin

=== 2020s ===
Year	Actor	Show	Character
2020	No award given due to COVID-19 pandemic.		
2021	No award given due to COVID-19 pandemic.		
2022	Justin Cooley	Kimberly Akimbo	Seth Weetis
2023	Alex Newell	Shucked	Lulu
2024	Andrew Durand	Dead Outlaw	Elmer McCurdy
2025	Nicholas Barasch	Pirates! The Penzance Musical	Frederic
2026	Ali Louis Bourzgui	The Lost Boys	David

== Most promising female (US) ==
Source: US winners

=== 1940s ===
Year	Actor	Show	Character
1945	Judy Holliday	Kiss Them for Me	Alice
1946	Barbara Bel Geddes	Deep Are the Roots	Genevra Langdon
1947	Margaret Phillips	Another Part of the Forest	Birdie Bagtry
1948	Catherine Ayers	Moon of the Caribbean	Susie
1949	Leora Dana	The Madwoman of Chaillot	Irma

=== 1950s ===
Year	Actor	Show	Character
1950	Gloria Lane	The Consul	Secretary to the consulate
1951	Phyllis Love	The Rose Tattoo	Rose Delle Rose
1952	Anne Meacham	The Long Watch	Ensign Jane Hilton
1953	Jenny Egan	The Crucible	Mary Warren
1954	Vilma Kurer	The Winner	Hilde Kranzbeck
1955	Vivian Nathan	Anastasia	Charwoman
1956	Frances Sternhagen	The Admiral Bashville	Shavian Heroine
1957	Joan Croydon	The Potting Shed	Miss Connolly
1958	Collin Wilcox	The Day the Money Stopped	Ellen Wells
1959	Lois Nettleton	God and Kate Murphy	Shelagh O'Conner

=== 1960s ===
Year	Actor	Show	Character
1960	Rochelle Oliver	Toys in the Attic	Lily Berniers
1961	Rosemary Murphy	Period of Adjustment	Dorothea Bates
1962	Rebecca Drake	Who'll Save the Plowboy?	Helen Cobb
1963	Jessica Walter	Photo Finish	Clarice/Ada Cooney
1964	Joyce Ebert	The Trojan Women	Andromache
1965	Elizabeth Hubbard	The Physicists	Monika Stettler
1966	Jean Hepple	Serjeant Musgrave's Dance	Annie
1967	Reva Rose	You're a Good Man, Charlie Brown	Lucy van Pelt
1968	Catherine Burns	The Prime of Miss Jean Brodie	Monica
1969	Marlene Warfield	The Great White Hope	Clara

=== 1970s ===
Year	Actor	Show	Character
1970	Pamela Payton-Wright	The Effect of Gamma Rays on Man-in-the-Moon Marigolds	Tillie
1971	Katherine Helmond	The House of Blue Leaves	Bananas
1972	Pamela Bellwood	Butterflies Are Free	Jill Tanner
1973	Mari Gorman	The Hot l Baltimore	Jackie
1974	Ann Reinking	Over Here!	Maggie
1975	Mary Beth Hurt	Love for Love	Miss Prue
1976	Nancy Snyder	Knock Knock	Joan of Arc
1977	Rose Gregorio	The Shadow Box	Agnes
1978	Margaret Hilton	Molly	Eve
1979	Laurie Kennedy	Man and Superman	Violet Robinson

=== 1980s ===
Year	Actor	Show	Character
1980	Dianne Wiest	On the Art of Dining	Elizabeth Barrow
1981	Mia Dillon	Crimes of the Heart	Babe Botrelle
1982	Joann Camp	Geniuses	Skye Bullene
1983	Dana Ivey	Present Laughter	Monica Reed
1983	Dana Ivey	Quartermaine's Terms	Melanie Garth
1984	Joan Allen	And a Nightingale Sang	Hellen Stott
1985	Joanna Gleason	A Day in the Death of Joe Egg	Pam
1986	Patti Cohenour	The Mystery of Edwin Drood	Rosa Bud
1987	Annette Bening	Coastal Disturbances	Holly Dancer
1988	Christine Estabrook	The Boys Next Door	Sheila
1989	Mercedes Ruehl	Other People's Money	Kate Sullivan

=== 1990s ===
Year	Actor	Show	Character
1990	Mary-Louise Parker	Prelude to a Kiss	Rita Boyle
1991	Jane Adams	I Hate Hamlet	Deirdre McDavey
1992	Tonya Pinkins	Jelly's Last Jam	Anita
1993	Ann Dowd	Candida	Miss Proserpine Garnett
1994	Jeanne Paulsen	The Kentucky Cycle	Joleen Rowen
1995	Calista Flockhart	The Glass Menagerie	Laura Wingfield
1996	LisaGay Hamilton	Valley Song	Veronica
1997	Allison Janney	Present Laughter	Liz Essendine
1998	Julyana Soelistyo	Golden Child	Eng Ahn
1999	Kristin Chenoweth	You're a Good Man, Charlie Brown	Sally Brown

=== 2000s ===
Year	Actor	Show	Character
2000	Sherie Rene Scott	Aida	Amneris
2001	Spencer Kayden	Urinetown	Little Sally
2002	Anne Hathaway	Carnival!	Lili
2003	Kerry Butler	Hairspray	Penny Pingleton
2004	Anika Noni Rose	Caroline, or Change	Emmie Thibodeaux
2005	Ari Graynor	Brooklyn Boy	Alison
2006	Felicia P. Fields	The Color Purple	Sofia
2007	Leslie Kritzer	Legally Blonde	Serena
2008	Zoe Kazan	Come Back, Little Sheba	Marie
2008	Zoe Kazan	Things We Want	Stella
2008	Zoe Kazan	100 Saints You Should Know	Abby
2009	Quincy Tyler Bernstine	Ruined	Salima

=== 2010s ===
Year	Actor	Show	Character
2010	Nina Arianda	Venus in Fur	Vanda Jordan
2011	Tracee Chimo	Bachelorette	Regan
2012	Susan Pourfar	Tribes	Sylvia
2013	Annaleigh Ashford	Kinky Boots	Lauren
2014	Whitney Bashor	The Bridges of Madison County	Marian/Chiara
2015	Phillipa Soo	Hamilton	Eliza Schuyler Hamilton
2016	Alana Arenas	Head of Passes	Cookie
2017	Katrina Lenk	The Band's Visit	Dina
2018	Ashley Park	KPOP	MwE
2018	Ashley Park	Mean Girls	Gretchen Wieners
2019	Sarah Stiles	Tootsie	Sandy Lester

=== 2020s ===
Year	Actor	Show	Character
2022	Kara Young	Clyde's	Letitia
2023	Bonnie Milligan	Kimberly Akimbo	Aunt Debra
2024	Hannah Cruz	The Connector	Robin Martinez
2024	Hannah Cruz	Suffs	Inez Milholland
2025	Julia Lester	All Nighter	Wilma
2026	McKenzie Kurtz	Heathers	Heather Chandler
2026	McKenzie Kurtz	Schmigadoon!	Betsy McDonough

== Winners (UK) ==
Source for UK winners.

=== Best male in a supporting role ===
- 1948 Colin Gordon as Rupert Billings in The Happiest Days of Your Life
- 1949 Robin Bailey as Faulkland in The Rivals
- 1950 Denholm Elliott as Edgar in Venus Observed
- 1951 Hugh Griffith as The Father in Point of Departure
- 1952 Paul Rogers as William Villon in The Other Heart
- 1953 Ernest Clark as Dr Skillingworth in Escapade
- 1954 Richard Wordsworth as Antonio in Venice Preserv'd
- 1955 Noel Willman as Interrogator in The Prisoner
- 1956 Timothy Bateson as Lucky in Waiting for Godot
- 1957 Derek Godfrey as Iachimo in Cymbeline
- 1958 Paul Daneman as Henry VI in Henry VI, parts I, II and III
- 1959 Alan Bates as Edmund Tyrone in Long Day's Journey into Night
- 1960 Alec McCowen as Touchstone in As You Like It
- 1961 Peter Woodthorpe as Aston in The Caretaker
- 1962 John Moffatt as Cardinal Cajetan in Luther
- 1963 Frank Finlay as Corporal Hill in Chips with Everything
- 1964 Charles Gray as Maxim in Poor Bitos
- 1965 Ian McKellen as Godfrey in A Scent of Flowers
- 1966 Edward Hardwicke as Camille Chandebise in A Flea in Her Ear
- 1967 Paul Eddington as Capt M Doleful in Jorrocks
- 1968 Timothy West as Otto in The Italian Girl
- 1969 Gordon Jackson as Horatio in Hamlet
- 1970 Robert Eddison as Lightborn in Edward II
- 1971 Michael Bates as Charles Bisley in Forget-me-not Lane
- 1972 Richard O'Callaghan as Joey in Butley
- 1973 Alan MacNaughtan as Philinte in The Misanthrope
- 1974 John Tordoff as The Man in Misalliance
- 1975 Mike Gwilym as Death in King John
- 1976 Peter Blythe as Peter Frame in The Chairman]]
- 1977 Nigel Hawthorne as Major Flack in Privates on Parade
- 1978 Jeremy Irons as Jameson in Rear Column
- 1979 Michael Bryant as Sir Paul Plyant in Double Dealer
- 1980 Richard Griffiths as Lariosik in White Guard
- 1981 David Threlfall as Smike in Nicholas Nickleby
- 1982 Harold Innocent as Cayley Drummle in The Second Mrs Tanqueray
- 1983 Michael Aldridge as Selsdon Mowbray in Noises Off
- 1984 Bill Fraser as Pischik in The Cherry Orchard
- 1985 David Ryall as Sicinius Velutus in Coriolanus
- 1986 Charles Kay as Lord Charles Canteloupe in Waste
- 1987 Frank Grimes as Ned in Holiday
- 1988 Clive Francis as The Detective in A Small Family Business
- 1989 Niall Buggy as Casimir in Aristocrats
- 1990 Desmond Barrit as Trinculo in The Tempest
- 1991 Terence Rigby as Dr Relling in The Wild Duck
- 1992 Lennie James as Mickey Jones in The Coup
- 1993 David Bradley as Robert Shallow in Henry IV, Part 2 and as Polonius in Hamlet
- 1994 Nicholas Le Prevost as Pontagnac in An Absolute Turkey
- 1995 Philip Locke as Lyndkvist in Easter
- 1996 Tony Haygarth as Simms the bookmaker in Simpatico
- 1997 Stephen Boxer as Barnabas Goche in The Herbal Bed
- 1998 Alan Dobie as The Fool in King Lear
- 1999 David Yelland as Buckingham in Richard III
- 2000 Roger Allam as Ulysses in Troilus and Cressida
- 2001 Malcolm Sinclair as Gavin Ryng-Mayne in House & Garden
- 2002 Ian McDiarmid as Teddy in Faith Healer
- 2003 Bette Bourne as Pauncefort Quentin in The Vortex
- 2004 Simon Trinder as Biondello in The Taming of the Shrew
- 2005 Adrian Scarborough as Ivan Ivanovitch in The Mandate
- 2006 John Wood as Swallow in Henry IV, Part 2
- 2007 Geoffrey Hutchings as Herr Schultz in Cabaret
- 2008 Phil Davis as Vassilly in The Philistines
- 2009 Clifford Rose as The Judge in The Chalk Garden
- 2010 Stanley Townsend as Theseus in Phèdre
- 2011 William Gaunt as Worcester and Robert Shallow in Henry IV, Part 1 and Henry IV, Part 2
- 2012 Danny Webb as Harry Kahn in Chicken Soup with Barley
- 2013 Paul Chahidi as Maria in Twelfth Night
- 2014 Charles Edwards as Charles Marsden in Strange Interlude
- 2015 Adam James as Prime Minister Tristram Evans
- 2017 Peter Polycarpou as Ahmed Qurei in Oslo / Jonjo O'Neill as Ivan in Unreachable and as Cymbeline in Cymbeline
- 2018 Irfan Shamji as Harry in Mayfly, John in One for Sorrow, and Luke in Dance Nation
- 2019 Hammed Animashaun as Willie in "Master Harold"...and the Boys and as Nick Bottom in A Midsummer Night's Dream
- 2020 Luke Thallon as Fritz/Leo in Leopoldstadt

=== Best female in a supporting role ===
- 1948 Jessica Spencer as Barbara Martin in Royal Circle
- 1949 Gwen Cherrell as Cherry in The Beaux' Stratagem
- 1950 Daphne Arthur as Margaret in The Holly and the Ivy
- 1951 Frances Rowe as Alex Cornwall in Who Goes There!
- 1952 Valerie Hanson as Marionetta in Nightmare Abbey
- 1953 Brenda De Banzie as Freda Jefferies in Murder Mistaken
- 1954 Patricia Jessel as Romaine in Witness for the Prosecution
- 1955 Beryl Measor as The Housekeeper in Separate Tables
- 1956 Margaret Vines as Gibbs in Morning at Seven
- 1957 Megs Jenkins as Beatrice in A View from the Bridge
- 1958 Lally Bowers as Madame Montrachet in Dinner with the Family
- 1959 Avice Landone as Mrs Sylvia Bennett in Not in the Book
- 1960 Pauline Jameson as Mrs Prest in The Aspern Papers
- 1961 Rachel Roberts as Anna Petrovna in Platonov
- 1962 Judi Dench as Anya in The Cherry Orchard
- 1963 Jessie Evans as Miriam Morton in The Keep
- 1964 Eileen Atkins as Juliet in Exit the King
- 1965 Jeanne Hepple as Mary Warren in The Crucible
- 1966 Gemma Jones as Adele in The Cavern
- 1967 Vickery Turner as Sandy in The Prime of Miss Jean Brodie
- 1968 Anne Dyson as Mrs Gascoyne in The Daughter-in-law
- 1969 Elizabeth Spriggs as Claire in A Delicate Balance
- 1970 Denise Coffey as Aurora Botterill in The Bandwagon
- 1971 Rosemary McHale as Joanne in Slag
- 1972 Heather Canning as Christine in Miss Julie
- 1973 Bridget Turner as Anna in Time and Time Again
- 1974 Anna Carteret as Virginia in Saturday, Sunday, Monday
- 1975 Dorothy Reynolds as Comtesse de la Brière in What Every Woman Knows
- 1976 Lynn Farleigh as Charlotte in A Room with a View
- 1977 Sheila Gish as four parts in Confusions
- 1978 Suzanne Bertish as Octavia in All for Love
- 1979 Maxine Audley as Olive in Here Comes Trouble
- 1980 Felicity Kendal as Constanze in Amadeus
- 1981 Sinéad Cusack as Celia in As You Like It
- 1982 Barbara Leigh-Hunt as Gertrude in Hamlet
- 1983 Sylvia Coleridge as Em in Clay
- 1984 Nichola McAuliffe as Queen Victoria in Poppy
- 1985 Zoë Wanamaker as Kattrin in Mother Courage
- 1986 Imelda Staunton as Bessie Watley in The Corn Is Green
- 1987 Patricia Hayes as Maria Josepha in The House of Bernarda Alba
- 1988 Barbara Jefford as Falathiel Trennanigan in Ting Tang Mine
- 1989 Sarah Woodward as Sophie in Artist Descending a Staircase
- 1990 Linda Kerr-Scott as Djigan in Ghetto
- 1991 Lesley Manville as Natasha in Three Sisters
- 1992 Celia Imrie as Jessica Tilehouse in The Sea
- 1993 Helen Burns as Karen Frick in The Last Yankee
- 1994 Sara Kestelman as Fraulein Schneider in Cabaret
- 1995 Susan Engel as Mrs Heidleberg in The Clandestine Marriage
- 1996 Sophie Thompson as Amy in Company
- 1997 Aisling O'Sullivan as The Wild Young Woman in The Cripple of Inishmaan
- 1998 Miriam Karlin as Zofia in Tongue of a Bird
- 1999 Faith Brook as Mother in Good
- 2000 Kika Markham as Hilda Latymer in A Song at Twilight
- 2001 Linda Bassett as Harper in Far Away
- 2002 Marcia Warren as Mercy Lott in Humble Boy
- 2003 Amanda Drew as Gertrude in Eastward Ho!
- 2004 Dilys Laye as Madame de Rosemond in Les liaisons dangereuses
- 2005 Jaye Griffiths as Emilia in Othello
- 2006 Amanda Harris as Celia in As You Like It
- 2007 Sheila Hancock as Fraulein Schneider in Cabaret
- 2008 Pam Ferris as Phoebe in The Entertainer
- 2009 Phoebe Nicholls as Frances Trebell in Waste and as Helen Seville in The Vortex
- 2010 Josefina Gabrielle as Ursula in Sweet Charity
- 2011 Sheridan Smith as Doris in Flare Path
- 2012 Vinette Robinson as Ophelia in Hamlet
- 2013 Fenella Woolgar as Thea Elvsted in Hedda Gabler
- 2014 June Watson as Mammy in The Cripple of Inishmaan and as Nanny in Before the Party
- 2015 Deborah Findlay as Volumnia in Coriolanus
- 2017 Sheila Atim as Ferdinand in The Tempest and as the Woman in Les Blancs / Kate O'Flynn as Laura Wingfield in The Glass Menagerie
- 2018 Michelle Fairley as Cassius in Julius Caesar
- 2019 Lucy Briers as Mrs Helseth in Rosmersholm
- 2020 Rosalind Eleazar as Yelena in Uncle Vanya

=== Student Award ===
- 2015 Scott Lyons
- 2015 Danielle Whitfield
- 2018 Sophie Harris
- 2018 David Perkins
- 2019 Elizabeth Hammerton
- 2019 Vincent Rosec
- 2020 Sharune
- 2020 Joseph Scatley

=== Young Student Award ===
- 2015 Joanne Gale
- 2015 Luke Hallgarten
- 2018 Tessa Carmody
- 2018 Sam Elwin
- 2019 Jonny Grundy
- 2019 Constance Wookey
- 2020 Jefferson Parlett
- 2020 Abigail Carter-Simpson
