= American Standard (James Taylor album) =

Studio album by James Taylor
- Released: February 28, 2020
- Recorded: 2017—2019
- Studios: The Barn (Washington, MA); United Recording Studios and Capitol Studios (Hollywood, CA); Treasure Isle Studios and Blackbird Studios (Nashville, TN); Studio D (New York City, New York)
- Length: 44:59
- Label: Fantasy
- Producers: Dave O'Donnell; John Pizzarelli; James Taylor

James Taylor chronology
| Before This World (2015) | American Standard (2020) |

American Standard is the twentieth studio album by American singer-songwriter James Taylor, released on February 28, 2020, by Fantasy Records. It consists of his interpretations of standard songs from the American canon. It won Best Traditional Pop Vocal Album at the 63rd Annual Grammy Awards.

This album was primarily recorded at his home in Massachusetts starting in late 2017 until 2019. It was produced, recorded and mixed by Dave O'Donnell and co-produced by John Pizzarelli and James Taylor. Mastered by Ted Jensen at Sterling Sound Nashville.

== Critical reception ==
Professional ratings
Aggregate scores
| Source | Rating |
|---|---|
| Metacritic | 60/100 |
Review scores
| Source | Rating |
| AllMusic | 3.5/5 stars |
| The Independent | 4/5 stars |
| Mojo | 3/5 stars |
| PopMatters | 5/10 stars |
| Uncut | 3/5 stars |

American Standard received generally positive reviews from critics. At Metacritic, which assigns a normalized rating out of 100 to reviews from critics, the album received an average score of 60, which indicates "generally favorable reviews", based on 8 reviews.

== Track listing ==
American Standard track listing
| No. | Title | Writer(s) | Length |
|---|---|---|---|
| 1. | "My Blue Heaven" | Walter Donaldson, George A. Whiting | 2:43 |
| 2. | "Moon River" | Henry Mancini, Johnny Mercer | 3:13 |
| 3. | "Teach Me Tonight" | Gene de Paul, Sammy Cahn | 2:58 |
| 4. | "As Easy as Rolling Off a Log" | M.K. Jerome, Jack Scholl | 2:50 |
| 5. | "Almost Like Being in Love" | Frederick Loewe, Alan Jay Lerner | 3:42 |
| 6. | "Sit Down, You're Rockin' the Boat" | Frank Loesser | 4:11 |
| 7. | "The Nearness of You" | Hoagy Carmichael, Ned Washington | 3:52 |
| 8. | "You've Got to Be Carefully Taught" | Richard Rodgers, Oscar Hammerstein II | 2:26 |
| 9. | "God Bless the Child" | Billie Holiday, Arthur Herzog Jr. | 3:21 |
| 10. | "Pennies from Heaven" | Arthur Johnston, Johnny Burke | 2:52 |
| 11. | "My Heart Stood Still" | Richard Rodgers, Lorenz Hart | 3:27 |
| 12. | "Ol' Man River" | Jerome Kern, Oscar Hammerstein II | 2:53 |
| 13. | "It's Only a Paper Moon" | Harold Arlen, Yip Harburg, Billy Rose | 3:11 |
| 14. | "The Surrey with the Fringe on Top" | Richard Rodgers, Oscar Hammerstein II | 3:20 |
| Total length: | | | 44:59 |

Target edition bonus tracks & Japan bonus tracks
| No. | Title | Writer(s) | Length |
|---|---|---|---|
| 15. | "I've Grown Accustomed to Her Face" | Loewe, Lerner | 2:15 |
| 16. | "Never Never Land" | Jule Styne, Betty Comden, Adolph Green | 3:22 |
| Total length: | | | 50:42 |

=== Over the Rainbow: The American Standard EP ===
Track listing
| No. | Title | Writer(s) | Length |
|---|---|---|---|
| 1. | "I've Grown Accustomed to Her Face" | Loewe, Lerner | 2:15 |
| 2. | "Never Never Land" | Styne, Comden, Green | 3:22 |
| 3. | "Over the Rainbow" | Harold Arlen, Yip Harburg | 3:07 |
| Total length: | | | 8:45 |

== Album credits ==
=== Musicians ===
- James Taylor – vocals, guitar
- Larry Goldings – keyboards, piano, Hammond B3 organ
- John Pizzarelli – guitars, 7-string nylon guitar
- Jerry Douglas – dobro
- Jimmy Johnson – bass
- Michael Landau – guitars
- Viktor Krauss – upright bass
- Steve Gadd – drums
- Luis Conte – percussion
- Lou Marini – saxophones, flute, clarinet
- Walt Fowler – trumpets, flugelhorn
- Stuart Duncan – violin
- Andrea Zonn – violin, vocals
- Dorian Holley – vocals
- Kate Markowitz – vocals
- Arnold McCuller – vocals
- Caroline Taylor – vocals (14)

=== Production ===
- James Taylor – producer
- John Pizzarelli – producer
- Dave O'Donnell – producer, engineer, mixing
- Sean Badum – assistant engineer
- Brandon Epps – assistant engineer
- Chandler Harrod – assistant engineer
- Tyler Hartman – assistant engineer
- Jimmy Johnson – assistant engineer
- Robbie Kapoor – assistant engineer
- Rick Kwan – assistant engineer
- Ted Jensen – mastering at Sterling Sound (Nashville, TN)
- Justin Shturtz – mastering assistant
- Ryan Smith – additional mastering for vinyl at Sterling Sound
- JoAnn Tominaga – production coordinator
- Norman Seeff – front cover photography
- Ellyn Kusmin – back cover and booklet photography, personal assistant, director of studio operations
- Carrie Smith – art direction, design

== Charts ==
=== Weekly charts ===
Weekly chart performance for American Standard
| Chart (2020) | Peak position |
|---|---|
| Australian Albums (ARIA) | 23 |
| Belgian Albums (Ultratop Flanders) | 161 |
| Belgian Albums (Ultratop Wallonia) | 96 |
| Canadian Albums (Billboard) | 1 |
| Dutch Albums (Album Top 100) | 55 |
| French Albums (SNEP) | 195 |
| German Albums (Offizielle Top 100) | 24 |
| Irish Albums (IRMA) | 55 |
| Italian Albums (FIMI) | 50 |
| Portuguese Albums (AFP) | 37 |
| Scottish Albums (Official Charts) | 2 |
| Spanish Albums (PROMUSICAE) | 14 |
| Swiss Albums (Schweizer Hitparade) | 66 |
| UK Albums (Official Charts) | 11 |
| US Billboard 200 | 4 |
| US Top Rock & Alternative Albums (Billboard) | 1 |

=== Year-end charts ===
Year-end chart performance for American Standard
| Chart (2020) | Position |
|---|---|
| US Top Rock Albums (Billboard) | 47 |

== See also ==
- List of 2020 albums
