= Intiman Theatre =

American theatre company, founded 1972

Coordinates: 47°37′27.49″N 122°21′8.79″W

- Formation: 1972
- Type: Theatre group
- Location: Seattle
- Artistic director: Jennifer Zeyl
- Website: www.intiman.org

Intiman Theatre is a resident theater company in Seattle, Washington, founded in 1972 by Margaret "Megs" Booker, who named it after Strindberg's Intimate Theater in Stockholm. It has been based at various venues in Seattle, and became theater-in-residence at Seattle Central College in 2021, performing in two of the campus's venues.

== Organization ==
With a self-declared focus on "a resident acting ensemble, fidelity to the playwright's intentions and a close relationship between actor and audience", the Intiman soon called itself as "Seattle's classic theater". Its debut season in 1972 included Rosmersholm, The Creditors, The Underpants, and Brecht on Brecht. The theater has been host to Tony-nominated Director Bartlett Sher (who served as both a director and artistic director), Tony-nominated actress Celia Keenan-Bolger and film actor Tom Skerritt. It was also home to the world premieres of the Tony-winning Broadway musical The Light in the Piazza, Craig Lucas's Singing Forest and Dan Savage's Miracle!. Lucas also served as the Associate Artistic Director. Intiman won the 2006 Regional Theatre Tony Award.

Intiman launched its first summer theatre festival in July and August 2012 under the leadership of Artistic Director Andrew Russell and Managing Director Keri Kellerman. The festival featured four plays and a repertory company of 17 actors.

The Intiman Theatre Playhouse was renamed the Cornish Playhouse in 2013 and is managed by the Cornish College of the Arts.

In 2017, Phillip Chavira became Intiman's first executive director and departed in 2019. Wesley Frugé serves as Managing Director since early 2022. At the end of 2017, Andrew Russell completed his tenure as Producing Artistic Director, and Jennifer Zeyl became Intiman's seventh artistic director.

== History ==
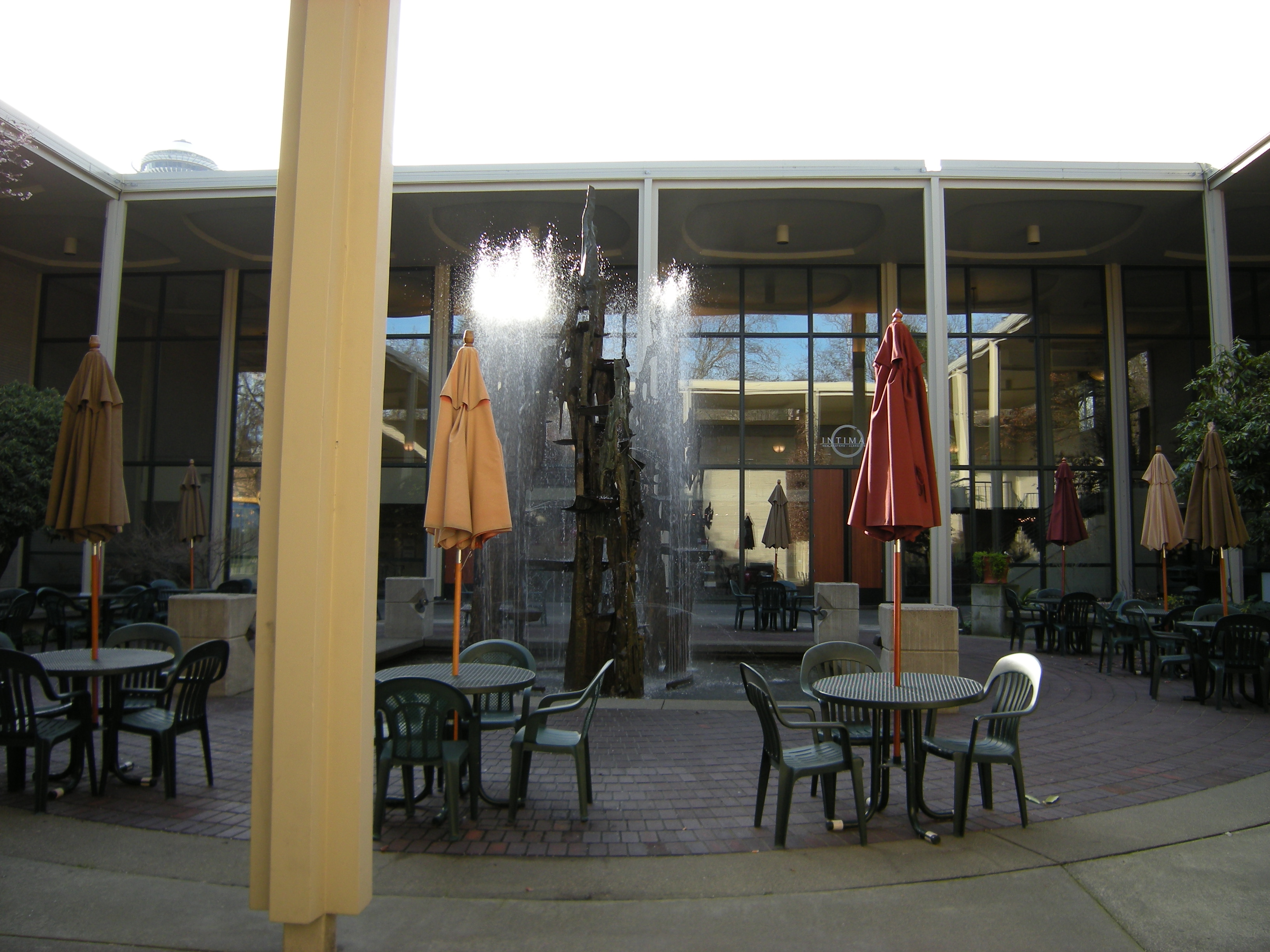
Courtyard of the Intiman Playhouse. Photographed 2009.

Intiman's original location was a 65-seat theater in Kirkland, Washington. Under the leadership of artistic directors Megs and John Booker, the Intiman officially incorporated as a non-profit theatre in 1973. Over the next few years, the company mounted productions at Cornish College and Gary Austin's Second Stage Theatre in Seattle, growing in attendance and budget each season. By 1978, Intiman called itself "Seattle's Classic Theatre" and featured a resident company of fourteen actors, including Megan Cole, Clayton Corzatte, Ted D'Arms, John Gilbert, Patricia Healy, Richard Riele, Peter Silbert, Meg Hilton, Barry Mulholland, and Jean Smart.

In 1977, Intiman opened a year-round administrative office in Pioneer Square, and hired Simon Siegl as its first general manager. With a season of five classic plays, Intiman also began New Plays Onstage, a parallel program which staged readings of contemporary works directed and performed by members of the ensemble. Over the next several years, Intiman was awarded institutional status by the King County and Washington State Arts Commissions, and received an NEA challenge grant.

After a three-year planning process, Intiman participated in the 1982 Scandinavia Today, an international exposition of Nordic culture. Intiman presented staged readings of five contemporary works and two classical works, The Wild Duck and A Dream Play, on its main stage in collaboration with Scandinavian directors, designers and playwrights.

Meanwhile, Second Stage, Intiman's venue for nine theatrical seasons, faced demolition to make way for the Washington State Convention Center. For several years, Intiman operated without a permanent home, unlike any other professional resident theatre in the area. Under the continued leadership of Booker and Siegl, Intiman rented various performance venues around the city on a short term basis, including Broadway Performance Hall on the campus of Seattle Central Community College.

In 1985, Peter Davis, a former scenic designer who had worked for both Intiman and Seattle Repertory Theatre, came aboard as Intiman's first managing director, and restructured Intiman's finances and administration. He successfully negotiated the plan for Intiman to operate and manage a theatre facility on the grounds of Seattle Center. That facility, the Seattle Center Playhouse (later Intiman Playhouse and later Cornish Playhouse), was originally built for the Century 21 Exposition, and then served as the original home of the Seattle Repertory Theatre. In 1982, the Seattle Repertory Theatre moved to a new facility elsewhere on the Seattle Center grounds. Intiman received a 22-year lease from the city. In 1987, after a US$1.2 million renovation, Intiman had a single facility with performance, rehearsal, production, shop and administrative areas for the first time in its history. As it moved into its new facility, Intiman hired a new artistic director, Elizabeth Huddle, who served for the next six years, succeeded in 1993 by Warner Shook.

In 1994, Intiman became the first regional theatre company in the country to be awarded the rights to produce Tony Kushner's Tony- and Pulitzer-winning two-part epic Angels in America. Part One: Millennium Approaches closed Intiman's 1994 season, and Part Two: Perestroika opened the 1995 season. Directed by Shook, the complete Angels in America was the most commercially successful production ever to be produced at the theatre, reaching more than 63,000 attendees over its two-year run. Over the next decade, Intiman produced plays by such provocative and influential American writers as Edward Albee, Moisés Kaufman, Ellen McLaughlin, Terrence McNally, David Rabe, Anna Deavere Smith, Paula Vogel and Chay Yew.

=== 21st century ===
Between 2004 and 2008, Intiman completed a project entitled The American Cycle, a series of five plays written by prominent Americans, beginning with Thornton Wilder's Our Town. The next four productions were adapted from novels, including in order of performance, John Steinbeck's The Grapes of Wrath, Richard Wright's Native Son, Harper Lee's To Kill a Mockingbird and Robert Penn Warren's All the King's Men. A new project, The New American Cycle, began in 2009 with Robert E. Sherwood's Abe Lincoln in Illinois.

During the 2008–2010 seasons, leadership at Intiman transitioned several times. Laura Penn departed as managing director in March 2008, and was replaced by Brian Colburn in November 2008, who then resigned November 1, 2010. Kate Whoriskey succeeded Bartlett Sher as artistic director in 2010. Originally the plan was for them to jointly manage the first season of the transition, but that changed when Sher departed in March 2010.

The Intiman was $2.3 million in arrears by November 2010, and began a fundraising effort to pay overdue expenses and reduce debt. On April 16, 2011, the board of trustees voted to temporarily close the Intiman Theatre and lay off the entire staff, including Artistic Director Whoriskey. The board engaged a consultant to advise it on reopening the theatre in 2012. The first performance of the improv comedy show Seattle Theatresports took place on August 5, 2011, having been previously performed at the Gum Wall Theatre in Pike Place Market.

=== Productions in the 2010s ===
The 2013 Summer Festival featured productions of Trouble in Mind by Alice Childress, We Won't Pay! We Won't Pay! by Dario Fo, Lysistrata by Aristophanes and STU For Silverton by Peter Duchan. The 2016 festival featured productions of: Stick Fly by Lydia R. Diamond and Wedding Band: A Love/Hate Story in Black and White by Alice Childress. The 2017 festival featured productions Barbecue by Robert O'Hara and Dragon Lady by Sara Porkalob.

== Notable Intiman artists ==
- Bartlett Sher – former artistic director, 2000–2010
- Craig Lucas – Associate Artistic Director
- Tom Skerritt – Actor
- Stacy Keach – Actor
- Reiko Aylesworth – Actor
- John Aylward – Actor
- Celia Keenan-Bolger – Actor
- Patti Cohenour – Actor
- Laurence Ballard – Actor
- Jeanne Paulson – Actor
- Jean Smart - Actor
