= Covers (James Taylor album) =

Studio album by James Taylor
- Released: September 30, 2008
- Recorded: January 2008
- Genre: Rock
- Length: 42:07
- Label: Hear Music
- Producers: Dave O'Donnell; James Taylor

James Taylor chronology
One Man Band (2007)	Covers (2008)	Other Covers (2009)

Professional ratings
Review scores
Source	Rating
AllMusic	3/5 stars
The Rolling Stone Album Guide	3.5/5 stars
Toronto Star	3/4 stars

Covers is the eighteenth studio album and the first covers album by singer-songwriter James Taylor released in 2008. The album was recorded with his regular touring band. Some of the tunes Taylor had been performing off and on in concerts for years, while others were new to his repertoire. It received general positive reviews and two Grammy Award nominations.

== History ==
The album was recorded over ten snowed-in days in January 2008, in a converted barn in Weston, Massachusetts. Taylor was able to assemble his regular touring group (dubbed "The Band of Legends" for the tour supporting the album and as of 2014 dubbed "His All Star Band") to all be present at the same time, which was rare in the contemporary recording scene. Thus, few if any overdubs were necessary during the recording process. Some of the tunes Taylor had been performing off and on in concerts for years, while others were new to his repertoire. Altogether, 20 songs were recorded.

In promotion of Covers, Taylor appeared on numerous television shows. On the September 30 edition of The Colbert Report, he humorously answered a question regarding his philosophy by simply performing "(I'm a) Road Runner" in its entirety.

The effort garnered two Grammy Award nominations, for Best Pop Vocal Album and, concerning "Wichita Lineman", Best Male Pop Vocal Performance.

Some of the bonus tracks issued for different manifestations of the album ended up also being released on 2009's Other Covers mini-album follow-up.

== Track listing ==
1. "It's Growing" (Smokey Robinson, Warren Moore) – 4:07
2. "(I'm a) Road Runner" (Holland-Dozier-Holland) – 3:19
3. "Wichita Lineman" (Jimmy Webb) – 3:41
4. "Why Baby Why" (Darrell Edwards, George Jones) – 2:41
5. "Some Days You Gotta Dance" (Troy Johnson, Marshall Morgan) – 2:41
6. "Seminole Wind" (John Anderson) – 4:50
7. "Suzanne" (Leonard Cohen) – 3:36
8. "Hound Dog" (Jerry Leiber and Mike Stoller) – 3:03
9. "Sadie" (Joseph Jefferson, Charles Simmons, Bruce Hawes) – 4:34
10. "On Broadway" (Jerry Leiber, Mike Stoller, Cynthia Weil, Barry Mann) – 4:11
11. "Summertime Blues" (Eddie Cochran, Jerry Capehart) – 2:39
12. "Not Fade Away" (Buddy Holly, Norman Petty) – 2:45

=== QVC bonus tracks ===
1. "Get a Job" (The Silhouettes) – 4:07
2. "In the Midnight Hour" (Wilson Pickett, Steve Cropper) – 3:14
3. "Knock on Wood" (Eddie Floyd, Steve Cropper) – 3:52
4. "Oh, What a Beautiful Mornin'" (Richard Rodgers, Oscar Hammerstein II) – 3:10
5. Video on making of the album

Home shopping channel QVC made available this bonus CD/DVD on September 12, 2008. Taylor and his band appeared live during two half-hour segments on QVC that date, to play songs from the album and a couple of old favorites. Over 14,000 copies of the album sold during the shows.

=== UK bonus tracks ===
1. "Oh, What a Beautiful Mornin'" (Richard Rodgers, Oscar Hammerstein II)
2. "Knock on Wood" (Eddie Floyd, Steve Cropper)
3. "Shiver Me Timbers" (Tom Waits) – 4:19

The album was scheduled for release in the UK on February 2, 2009, and included three additional tracks. The tracks were not tacked at the end, but rather inserted at the front, before the penultimate, and at the end, respectively. This was part of a practice to make U.S. releases less attractive for overseas sales.

== Personnel ==
As listed in the album's liner notes:This is the first album since 1997 featuring James Taylor's touring band all in one setting for the entire album.

- James Taylor – lead vocals, guitar, harmonica
- Luis Conte – percussion
- Walt Fowler – trumpets
- Steve Gadd – drums
- Larry Goldings – piano, keyboards
- Jimmy Johnson – bass guitar
- Michael Landau – lead guitars
- David Lasley – vocals
- Yo-Yo Ma – cello on "Suzanne"
- Lou Marini, Jr. – flute, clarinet, saxophones
- Kate Markowitz – vocals
- Arnold McCuller – vocals
- Andrea Zonn – violin, vocals

== Chart positions ==
=== Weekly charts ===
Chart (2008–09)	Peak position
Canadian Albums (Billboard)	21
Dutch Albums (Album Top 100)	85
Irish Albums (IRMA)	42
Italian Albums (FIMI)	40
Scottish Albums (Official Charts)	14
Spanish Albums (Promusicae)	91
UK Albums (Official Charts)	23
US Billboard 200	4

=== Year-end charts ===
Chart (2008)	Position
US Billboard 200	168

== Certifications ==
Certifications for Covers
Region	Certification	Certified units/sales
United Kingdom (BPI)	Silver	60,000^{*}
^{*} Sales figures based on certification alone.
