= Ted Jensen =

American sound engineer (born 1954)

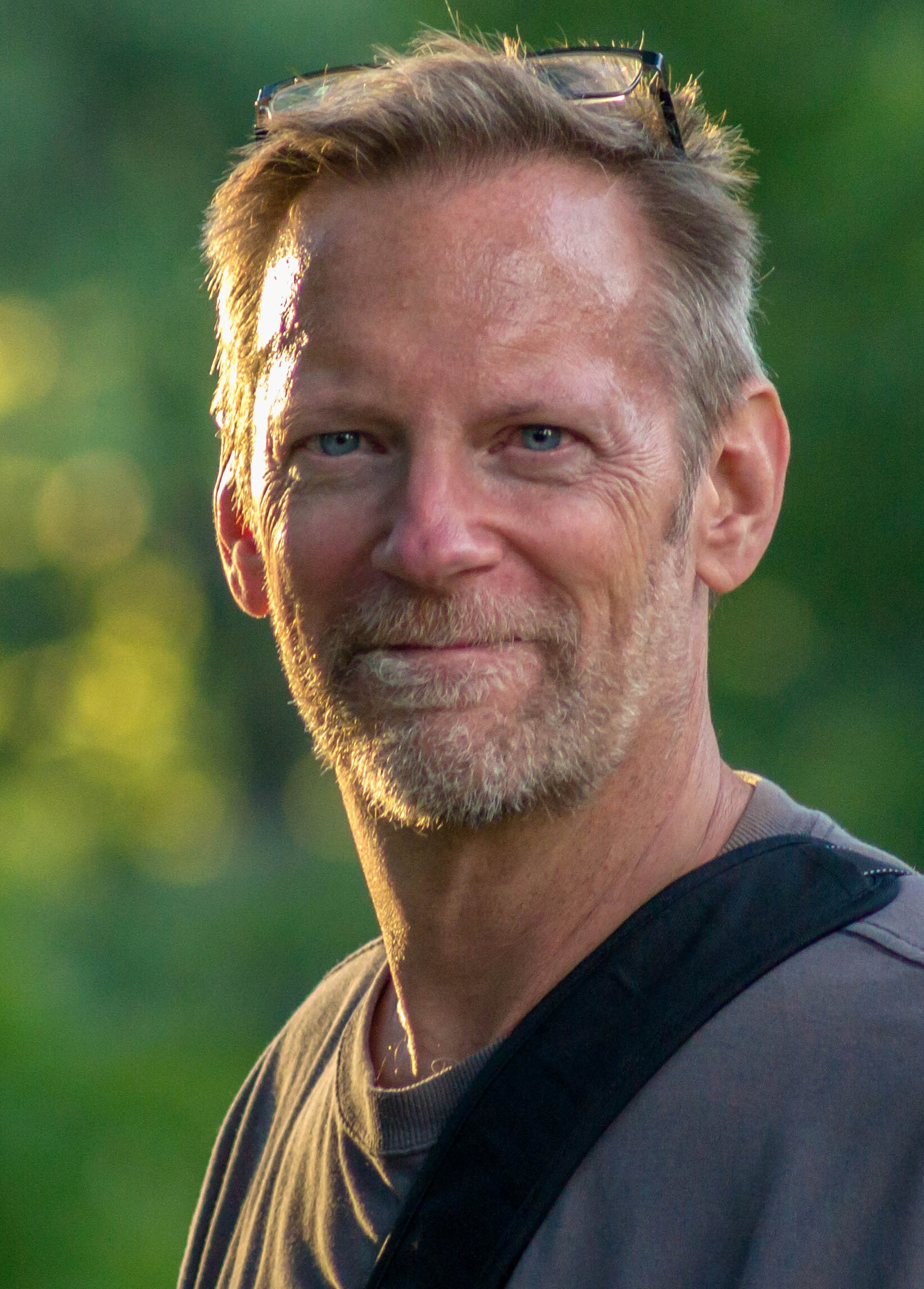
- Jensen in 2013

Background information
- Born: September 19, 1954 (age 72); New Haven, Connecticut, U.S.
- Occupation: Mastering engineer
- Years active: 1976–present
- Website: sterling-sound.com/engineer/ted-jensen/

Ted Jensen (born September 19, 1954) is an American mastering engineer known for having mastered many recordings, including the Eagles' Hotel California (1976), Norah Jones' Come Away with Me (2002), and Green Day's American Idiot (2004).

== Early life and education ==
Jensen was born on September 19, 1954, in New Haven, Connecticut, to Carl and Margaret (Anning) Jensen, both of whom were musicians. Carl had studied at Yale University. Margaret went to Oberlin College & Conservatory and Skidmore College and was also a pilot. Carl and Margaret met on a train while going to a choral workshop. Ted has one brother, Rick, and two daughters, Kristen and Kim.

While attending high school, Jensen was building his own stereo and recording equipment and began recording local bands both in the studio and at live events. During this time, he recorded several performances for the Yale Symphony Orchestra at Woolsey Hall in New Haven, and met Mark Levinson, who was starting an audio equipment company.

== Career ==
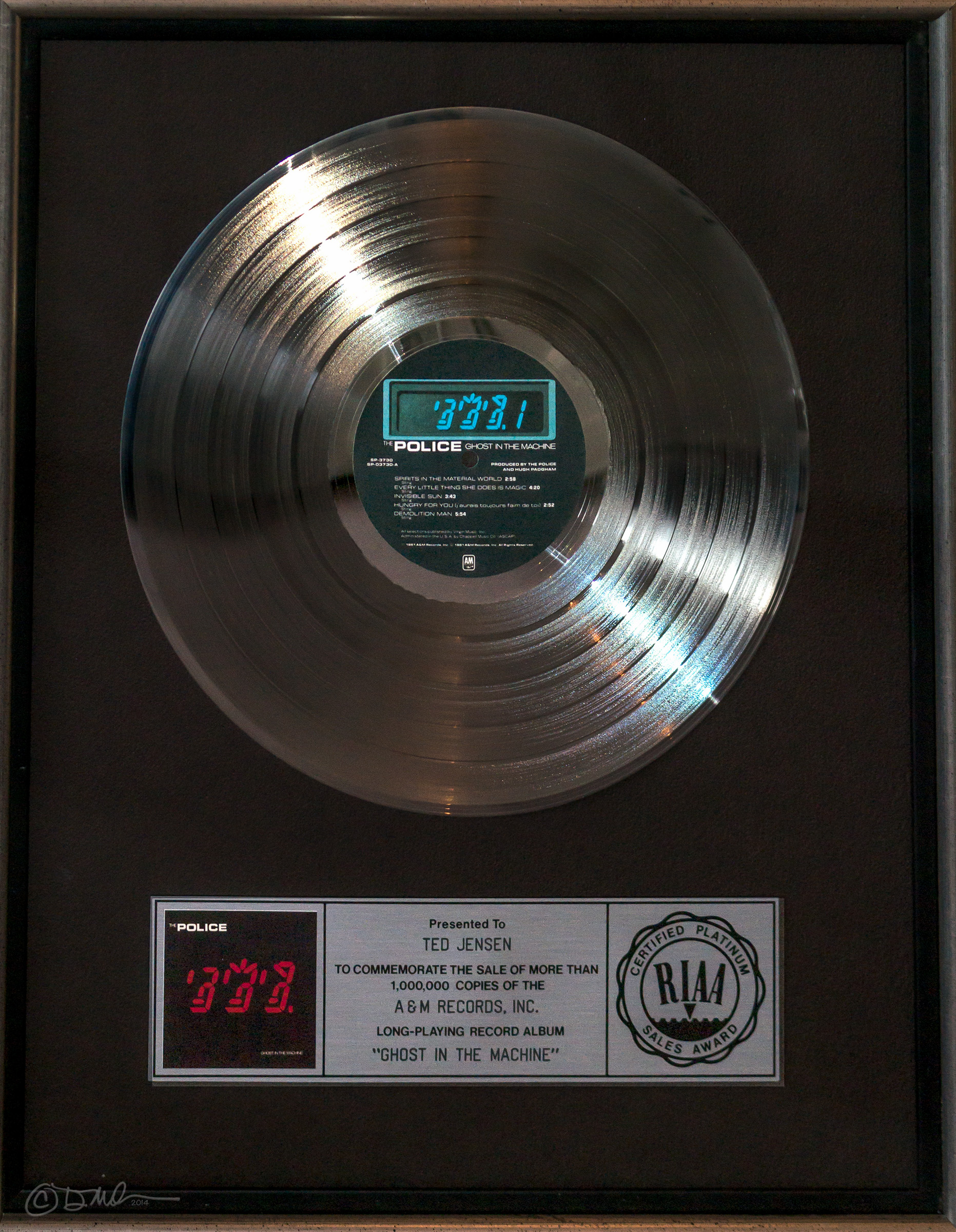
Jensen's platinum album for The Police's Ghost in the Machine, released in 1981

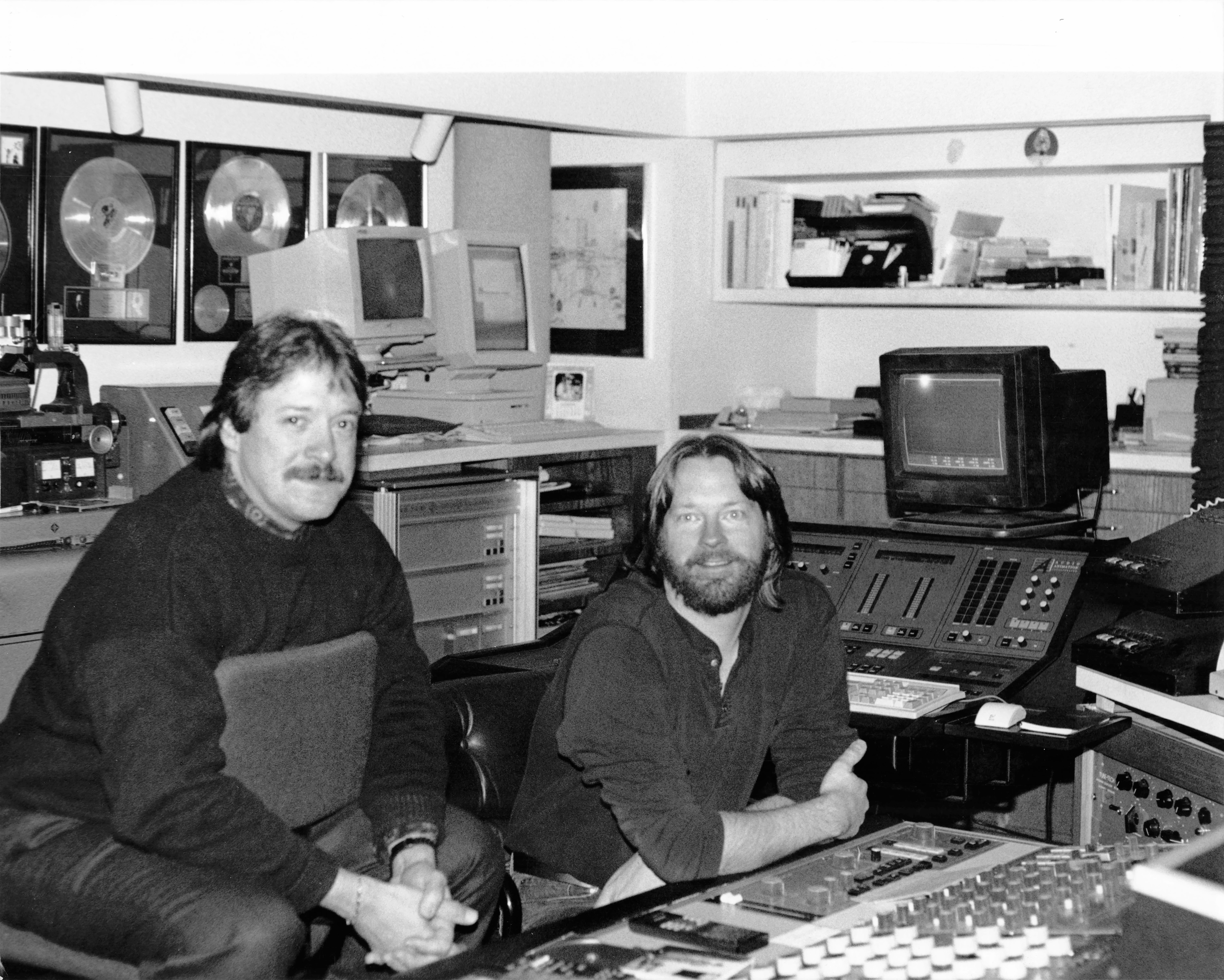
Jensen (right) with Jim Boyer at Sterling Sound in 1991

Jensen joined up with Levinson and aided in the design and manufacture some of the early products of Mark Levinson Audio Systems. In 1975, Jensen left after six years with Levinson to begin his mastering career with Sterling Sound in New York City.

There were three mastering engineers at Sterling Sound when Jensen was hired to work in the tape copy room, George Marino, Lee Hulko and Greg Calbi. One of Jensen's earliest mastering jobs was the first single by Talking Heads, "Love → Building on Fire" and later that year, Jensen mastered The Eagles' Hotel California. The following year, he mastered Billy Joel's The Stranger, which began a working relationship with Phil Ramone.

Jensen was promoted to Chief Mastering Engineer at Sterling in 1984, and since then has overseen several proprietary developments in mastering technology. This included working closely with Graham Boswell of Neve Electronics in the mid-1980s in developing the first all-digital mastering console, the DTC-1, and as one of the consultants to Apple for Mastering for iTunes.

Jensen also designed some of the studio monitors at Sterling, including the ones used by Tom Coyne. In 1998, Jensen, Greg Calbi and Tom Coyne, along with Murat Aktar (Absolute Audio co-founder) and UK based Metropolis, purchased Sterling Sound from previous owner Lee Hulko.

=== Studio ===
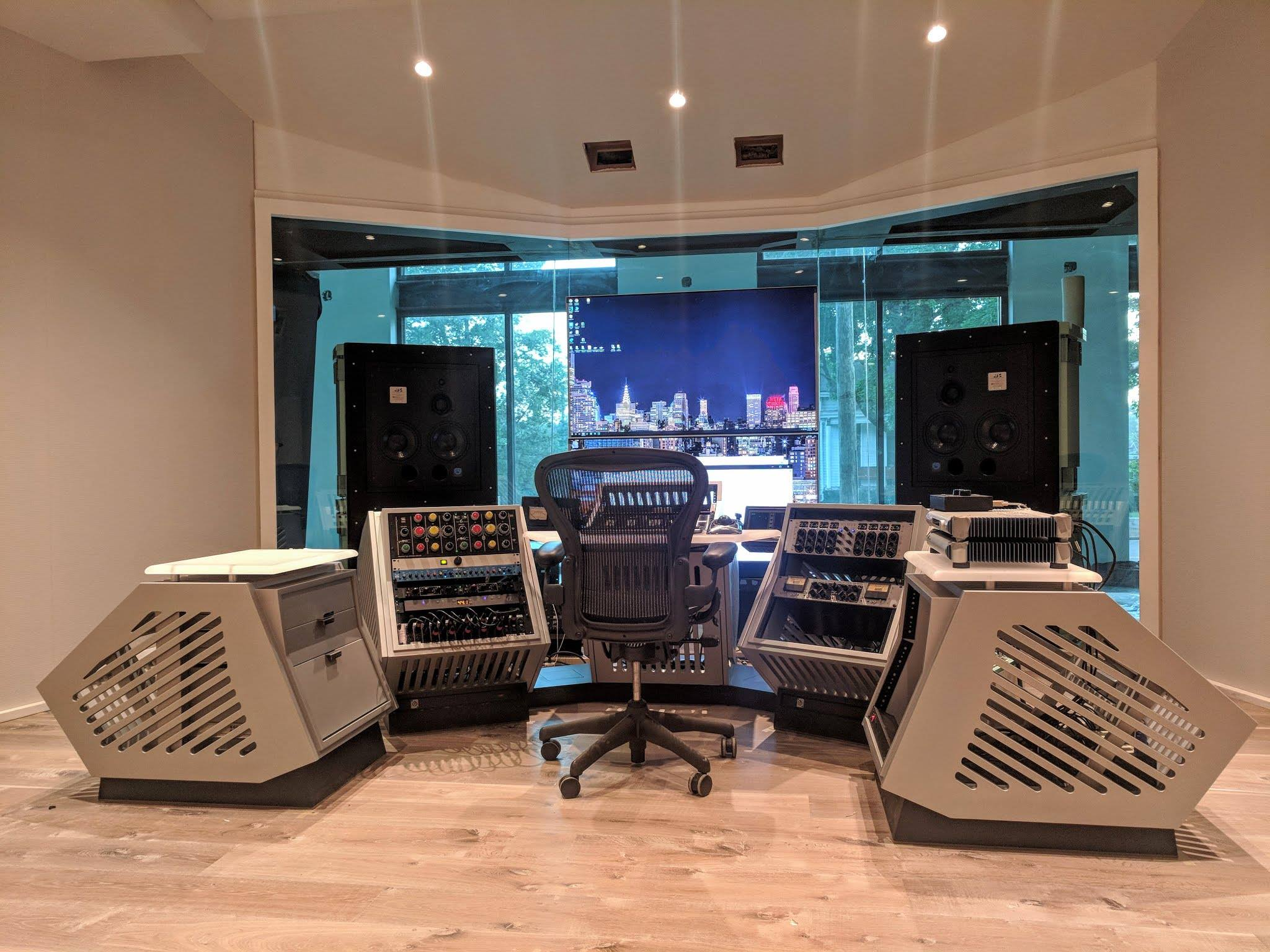
Jensen's mastering room at Sterling Sound Nashville in Nashville, Tennessee

Sterling Sound was previously located in New York City, where it occupied the top floor of the Chelsea Market in the Meatpacking District. Jensen's studio was one of the three surround sound studios at Sterling Sound. It was designed by Fran Manzella of FM Design.

In April 2018, Sterling Sound's 20-year lease for the facility in the Chelsea Market ended, and Jensen, along with senior engineer Ryan Smith, relocated to Nashville, Tennessee, where they opened Sterling Sound Nashville, which was designed by Thomas Jouanjean of Northward Acoustics.

== Awards and recognition ==
Since 1976, Jensen has mastered 16 Grammy Award winners in the categories of Record of the Year, Album of the Year and Best Engineered Album, Non-Classical. In 2002, Mastering Engineers became eligible to win Grammys in those categories.

Grammy Nominations

- 2003 – Album of the Year – Norah Jones' Come Away with Me
- 2004 – Album of the Year – Evanescence's Fallen
- 2005 – Album of the Year – Green Day's American Idiot
- 2014 – Best Engineered Album, Non-Classical – Alice in Chains' The Devil Put Dinosaurs Here
- 2016 – Best Engineered Album, Non-Classical – James Taylor's Before This World

Grammy Awards

- 2003 – Jensen received a Grammy Award – Norah Jones, for Come Away with Me, which won Album of the Year for 2002.

Latin Grammy Nominations

- 2007 Album of the Year – Ricky Martin – MTV Unplugged
- 2010 Album of the Year – Alejandro Sanz for Paraíso Express
- 2016 Album of the Year – Andrés Cepeda for Thousand Cities
- 2017 Album of the Year – Residente – Residente
- 2020 Album of the Year – Residente – René

Jensen has garnered 23 Mix Foundation TEC award nominations, winning 6 of them.

- 1999 – Outstanding Creative Achievement
- 2005 – Outstanding Creative Achievement for Record Production/Single or Track for Green Day – “American Idiot", American Idiot
- 2008 – Outstanding Creative Achievement for Surround Sound Recording for James Taylor – One Man Band
- 2010 – Outstanding Creative Achievement for Record Production/Single or Track for Green Day – “21 Guns”, 21st Century Breakdown
- 2010 – Outstanding Creative Achievement for Record Production/Album for Green Day – 21st Century Breakdown
- 2016 – Outstanding Creative Achievement for Record Production/Album for James Taylor – Before This World

== Selected works ==
Ted Jensen has mastered thousands of albums for more than 1,100 pop and rock artists. Additionally, Jensen has been involved in the soundtrack or music departments on several major motion pictures including Daredevil and The Circle.
