= Oh, What a Beautiful Mornin' =

1943 song from the musical Oklahoma!

Song
- Published: 1943
- Composer: Richard Rodgers
- Lyricist: Oscar Hammerstein II

"Oh, What a Beautiful Mornin'" is the opening song from the musical Oklahoma!, which premiered on Broadway in 1943. It was written by composer Richard Rodgers and lyricist/librettist Oscar Hammerstein II. The leading male character in Oklahoma!, Curly McLain, sings the song at the beginning of the first scene of the musical. The refrain runs: "Oh, what a beautiful mornin'! / Oh, what a beautiful day! / I've got a beautiful feelin' / Ev'rythin's goin' my way." Curly's "brimming optimism is perfectly captured by Rodgers' ebullient music and Hammerstein's buoyant pastoral lyrics."

This was the first song of Rodgers and Hammerstein's musical collaboration to be heard by theatre audiences. It has become one of their most famous numbers and "quickly became one of the most popular American songs to emerge from the wartime era, gaining currency away from Broadway first on the radio and recordings, and then later on numerous television variety shows." Brooks Atkinson, reviewing the original production in The New York Times, wrote that the number changed the history of musical theatre: "After a verse like that, sung to a buoyant melody, the banalities of the old musical stage became intolerable."

== Noteworthy recordings ==
Noteworthy recordings include the following:

- Bing Crosby and Trudy Erwin recorded the song in 1943 for Decca, as the B-side of a single covering "People Will Say We're In Love". The recording peaked at No. 4 on US charts.
- Frank Sinatra recorded the song as a single in 1943, released by Columbia Records as catalogue number 36682, it reached the No. 12 spot in the charts. The song appears on more than two dozen Frank Sinatra compilations. Sinatra first recorded the song a cappella: "a musician's strike ... occurred just as Sinatra was set to enter the studio and lay down his first tracks under the Columbia banner, so ... Sinatra went into the studio with a group of vocalists and recorded several songs ... a cappella".
- Ray Charles recorded the song several times, and one of his live recordings from the 1970s with the Count Basie Orchestra is included on his posthumous album Ray Sings, Basie Swings (2006)
- Eels included the song on their live album Oh What a Beautiful Morning (2000).
- James Taylor recorded the song in 2008 and released it as a bonus track on his album Covers (2008) and also on his album Other Covers (2009).

== In popular culture ==
Ethan Mordden titled his book about the dawn of the "Golden Age" of musicals Beautiful Mornin: The Broadway Musical in the 1940s (1999). The song was included in the revue A Grand Night for Singing, which ran on Broadway in 1993.

In 2004 and 2012, PBS broadcast a documentary series, "Broadway: The American Musical", one episode of which was titled "Oh, What a Beautiful Mornin'". At the 2005 Primetime Emmy Awards, the documentary won for Outstanding Nonfiction Series, and the episode won for Outstanding Sound Mixing for Nonfiction Programming and was nominated for two other Emmys: Outstanding Writing for Nonfiction Programming; and Outstanding Music Direction.

Spike Lee's 2025 film Highest 2 Lowest features the song in its opening sequence, sung by Norm Lewis.
