= The Kentucky Cycle =

1991 play in nine parts by Robert Schenkkan

- Original language: English
- Written by: Robert Schenkkan
- Subject: An epic of three families spanning 200 years of American history, in Kentucky
- Genre: Drama
- Setting: Kentucky, 1775-1975

Premiere
- Date: 1991
- Place: Intiman Theatre; Seattle, Washington

The Kentucky Cycle is a series of nine one-act plays by Robert Schenkkan that explores American mythology, particularly the mythology of the West, through the intertwined histories of three fictional families struggling over a portion of land in the Cumberland Plateau. The play won the 1992 Pulitzer Prize for Drama.

== Production history ==
The Kentucky Cycle was the result of several years of development, starting in New York City at New Dramatists and the Ensemble Studio Theatre. The two-part, six-hour epic was further developed at the Taper Lab New Work Festival Center Theatre Group/Mark Taper Forum and the Sundance Institute.

The complete cycle of short plays had its world premiere in June 1991 at the Intiman Theatre in Seattle, Washington. It was directed by Warner Shook. It was later produced as part of the Mark Taper Forum's 25th Anniversary Season on January 18, 1992.

The play was awarded the 1992 Pulitzer Prize for Drama, the first time in the history of the award that a play was so honored which had not first been presented in New York City. This feat would be repeated in 2003 with Nilo Cruz's Anna in the Tropics. The Kentucky Cycle also won both the PEN Centre West and the 1993 L.A. Drama Critics Circle Award for Best Play.

In 1993 it was produced at the John F. Kennedy Center in Washington, D.C. The play opened on Broadway on November 14, 1993 at the Royale Theatre and closed on December 12, 1993 after 33 performances and 15 previews. It was nominated for a Drama Desk Award and Outer Critics Circle Award, as well as three Tony Awards. Confronted by the massive Tony success of its Pulitzer successor, Tony Kushner's Angels in America: Millennium Approaches, the production failed to garner a single award.

The Broadway opening night cast included John Aylward, Lillian Garrett-Groag, Gail Grate, Katherine Hiler, Ronald Hippe, Gregory Itzin, Stacy Keach, Ronald William Lawrence, Scott MacDonald, Tuck Milligan, Randy Oglesby, Jeanne Paulsen, Stephen Lee Anderson, Michael Hartman, Philip Lehl, Patrick Page, Susan Pellegrino, James Ragland, Jennifer Rohn, Novel Sholars, and Lee Simon, Jr. The director was Warner Shook.

The play generated controversy with some Kentucky writers that claimed it trafficked in stereotypes. Others lauded what they saw as the plays' honesty. In 2001, the play was directed in Eastern Kentucky by a native Kentuckian with a cast that included both local and out-of-state actors. It continues to be produced across the United States, and is published by Dramatists Play Service.

=== In other media ===
In 1995, it was announced that the cable network HBO would produce a miniseries of The Kentucky Cycle, with Kevin Costner to direct, star in and produce. In 1996, it was reported that Costner had another project and consequently HBO was looking for another director. In 2002, a Playbill.com article noted that the HBO mini-series still had not been made.

== Play summaries ==
Source: Dramatists Play Service

Masters of the Trade (1775)
Michael Rowen deceives the Native Americans, gaining land and causing the tribe's death.

Courtship of Morning Star (1776)
Michael Rowen kidnaps and rapes Morning Star, producing a son, Patrick.

The Homecoming (1792)
Patrick Rowen kills both Michael Rowen and Joe Talbert and claims Rebecca Talbert as his wife, starting a cycle of revenge between the two families.

Ties That Bind (1819)
Patrick Rowen, deeply in debt, loses all he owns to the Talberts and becomes a sharecropper on his own land.

God's Great Supper (1861)
Jed Rowen recounts his haunting experiences in the Civil War, including his family's successful revenge against the Talberts as well as his encounters with William Clarke Quantrill.

Tall Tales (1890)
Working for the coal companies, a smooth-talking man named J.T. Wells swindles the Rowens out of their land.

Fire in the Hole (1920)
A union organizer attempts to rally Mary Anne Rowen's family and fellow miners into striking against the Blue Star Mining Company.

Which Side Are You On? (1954)
An underhanded deal between the union and the Blue Star Mining Company pits Joshua Rowen, James Talbert Winston, and Franklin Biggs against each other.

The War On Poverty (1975)
Three descendants of the Rowen, Talbert, and Biggs lines find something unexpected buried on the original Rowen homestead, shortly before they are to sell the land forever.

== Critical response ==
Frank Rich, in his review for The New York Times, wrote that " 'The Kentucky Cycle' is best enjoyed as a melodramatic pageant, and an entertaining one until it turns pedagogical when its story reaches the 20th century early in Part 2."

This play has also been criticized, notably by University of Kentucky (and Appalachian native) Dwight Billings as perpetuating stereotypes of Appalachia, saying "On the one hand, its (Appalachia's) population has been represented as a cultural other, out of step with mainstream life. On the other hand, its economy has been pictured either as an empty space of backwardness waiting to be filled by capitalism, or, conversely, as a zone of total dependency and exploitation, a metaphor for all that is wrong with the American political economy." Either portrayal, Billings argues, are "essentialist" views that reduce the complexity of Appalachia and its people to a one-dimensional preconception.

== Awards and nominations ==
Year	Award	Category	Work	Result	Ref.
1992	Pulitzer Prize for Drama		Robert Schenkkan	Won	
1994	Tony Award	Best Play		Nominated	
1994	Tony Award	Best Featured Actor in a Play	Gregory Itzin	Nominated	
1994	Tony Award	Best Featured Actress in a Play	Jeanne Paulson	Nominated	
1994	Drama Desk Award	Outstanding Play		Nominated	
1994	Drama Desk Award	Outstanding Actor in a Play	Stacy Keach	Nominated	
1994	Drama Desk Award	Outstanding Featured Actor in a Play	Gregory Itzin	Nominated	
1994	Clarence Derwent Award	Most Promising Female Performer	Jeanne Paulson	Nominated	

== See also ==
- The Pittsburgh Cycle, a series of ten plays by August Wilson, mostly set in Pittsburgh
