= Frederic Warriner =

American actor (1916–1992)

Frederic Warriner (June 2, 1916 – November 10, 1992) was an American stage actor.

== Early years ==
Warriner was the son of Frederic E. Warriner and Hildreth Vail Warriner, who was an actress. He was born in Pasadena, California. He graduated from Pasadena City College and performed at the Pasadena Community Playhouse for five years. He served in the Army for five years during World War II. His work with shows at military camps led to his being transferred from Alaska to a tour of bases in the South Pacific.

== Career ==
Warriner performed on stage in a variety of venues across the United States. They included the American Shakespeare Festival Theater in Connecticut, Barter Theater in Virginia, Folger Theater in Washington, Phoenix Theater Company in New York City, Wellesley Group 20 in Massachusetts, Hartford Summer Stage in Connecticut, New York Shakespeare Festivals, and Yale Repertory.

He traveled with Margaret Webster's Shakespearean company and in Oliver's original national company.

Warriner debuted on Broadway in King Lear (1950). His other Broadway credits included The Taming of the Shrew (1951), Getting Married (1951), Saint Joan (1951), A Pin to See the Peepshow (1953), The Wayward Saint (1955), The Carefree Tree (1955), Six Characters in Search of an Author (1955), Major Barbara (1956), Time Remembered (1957), Caligula (1960), She Stoops to Conquer (1960), The Plough and the Stars (1960), The Octoroon (1961), Hamlet (1961), Portrait of a Queen (1968), and Two Gentlemen of Verona (1971).

Off-Broadway plays in which Warriner acted included The Carefree Tree (1955), Androcles the Lion / The Policeman (1961), The White Devil (1965), Hamlet (1967), Romeo and Juliet (1968), Invitation to a Beheading (1969), Trelawney of the "Wells" (1970), and Two Gentlemen of Verona.

== Personal life ==
Warriner was married to Elinor Wright, a playwright and actress; they divorced in the 1950s.

== Death ==
On November 10, 1992, Warriner died of a brain hemorrhage at Middlesex Memorial Hospital in Middletown, Connecticut. He was 76.

== Recognition ==
Warriner received a Clarence Derwent Awards (for "best supporting performance in non-featured roles") in recognition of his performance in Getting Married in the 1950–1951 theater season.
