= October Road =

October Road may refer to:

- October Road (album), 2002
- October Road (TV series), 2007
