= Joan Croydon =

American actress

- Born: May 15, 1908; Tarrytown, New York, United States
- Died: April 23, 1985 (aged 76)
- Occupation: Actress

Joan Croydon (May 15, 1908 – April 23, 1985) was an American stage actress.

== Early years ==
Born as Vivienne Giesen in Tarrytown, New York to a French mother and a father of German/French descent. She was trained as a dancer at Isadora Duncan dance school. She was cast as a substitute lead nun in Max Reinhardt's The Miracle. She also had Broadway credits in the 1930s under her real name.

== Career ==
She appeared in only one film, The Bad Seed, in which she reprised her stage role, Miss Fern. The character she played, a murderous child's suspicious teacher, is one described in the play's stage notes as "dowdy", "a spinster", and "middle aged", and is generally played by much older actresses. In any event, Croydon received a poor review for her film performance from the New York Times' film critic, Bosley Crowther, who gave poor or mixed reviews to the entire cast in his review.

Croydon received rave reviews for playing the Mother in William Ball's production of Six Characters in Search of an Author. Croydon then became one of the founding members of The American Conservatory Theater (ACT) which originated in Pittsburgh and is now in San Francisco.

Croydon received a Clarence Derwent Award in 1957 for her performance as "Miss Connolly (Housekeeper)" in The Potting Shed.

== Stage credits ==
- Major Barbara as "Mrs. Baines" - from February 26, 1980, until March 30, 1980
- Compulsion as "Mrs. Straus" - from October 24, 1957, until February 22, 1958
- The Potting Shed as "Miss Connolly" - from January 29, 1957, until June 1, 1957
- The Bad Seed as "Miss Fern" - from December 8, 1954, until September 27, 1955
- The First Crocus as "Miss Engebretsen" - from January 2, 1942, until January 6, 1942

== Family ==
Croydon's husband was Guy Spaull (1904–1980), an American actor of stage and television. They had one child, Malcolm Spaull, who, as of March 2009, is the Chair of the Rochester Institute of Technology (RIT)'s Graduate School of Film and Animation in Rochester, New York.
