= Before This World =

Studio album by James Taylor
- Released: June 15, 2015
- Recorded: January, March, May–July, November 2014 – February 2015
- Studio: The Barn – January 2014 (Basic), August, October, November 2014 – February 2015 (Overdubs). United Recording March. Avatar Studios
- Genre: Soft rock; folk
- Length: 41:45
- Label: Concord
- Producer: Dave O'Donnell

James Taylor chronology
| The Essential James Taylor (2013) | Before This World (2015) | American Standard (2020) |

Professional ratings
Aggregate scores
| Source | Rating |
|---|---|
| Metacritic | 65/100 |
Review scores
| Source | Rating |
| AllMusic | 3.5/5 stars |
| The Telegraph | 3/5 stars |
| Newsday | A |
| Rolling Stone | 3.5/5 stars |

Before This World is the nineteenth studio album by American singer-songwriter James Taylor. Released on June 15, 2015, it was Taylor's first new studio album of original material since October Road (2002) and first studio album of any kind since Covers in 2008. He recorded the album in a barn on his property in western Massachusetts with Steve Gadd on drums and Jimmy Johnson on bass. In April 2015, he announced a short U.S. tour running from July 2 to August 6 to promote the album, which then continued into 2016 and 2017.

Before This World became Taylor's first album to reach number one on the Billboard 200 chart. The album arrived on top of the chart of July 4, 2015, more than 45 years after Taylor arrived on the list with Sweet Baby James (on the March 14, 1970, list). The album launched atop the Billboard 200 with 97,000 equivalent album units earned in the week ending June 21, 2015. Of its start, pure album sales were 96,000 copies sold, Taylor's best debut week for an album since October Road.

== Background ==
James Taylor's previous original album, October Road, was released in 2002, following which Taylor did not prioritize writing new material for many years. Concerned he might never create another original album, Taylor convinced family, friends, and manager he needed to cut off all communication and lived alone in a waterfront apartment in Newport, Rhode Island, while composing the album.

Lyrics from a song on Taylor's 1981 album, Dad Loves His Work, appear in the title of the opening track:

While my friends around me were calling, "today, today, today, today."

— James Taylor, "Believe It or Not", Dad Loves His Work (1981)

== Recording ==
Basic tracks were recorded at The Barn in Massachusetts during ten days in January 2014. This was followed by some dubbing of backup vocals at Ocean Way in Los Angeles during March 2014.

== Live performance ==
On his 2014 All Star Band tour, Taylor performed several tracks from the album prior to its release. "Today Today Today", "You And I Again" and "Stretch of the Highway" were debuted at the May 30, 2014, show and played throughout the tour; the traditional song "Wild Mountain Thyme" also earned a regular place in the shows (it had been previously performed by James Taylor occasionally in concert). At Toronto's show on July 24, 2014, James Taylor performed "SnowTime" specially and explained that the song was written about Toronto. "Angels of Fenway", "Montana" and "Before This World / Jolly Springtime" were all performed during his shows in his spring and summer tour of 2015, to coincide with the album's release.

== Commercial performance ==
Before This World debuted at number one with 97,000 units moved on the week ending June 21, becoming Taylor's first number one album on the US Billboard 200 chart. This made Taylor surpass Black Sabbath to become the second-longest waiting artist for a number one album – 47 years since James Taylor (1968) — behind a 54-year wait by Tony Bennett. Also, he had scored 11 Top 10 albums before achieving his first number one, just behind Neil Diamond. The following week, the album came in at number five, selling 50,000 copies in its second week.

On the UK Albums Chart, the album started at number four with 13,801 copies on sales, became Taylor's fourth top 10 album. It also tied with The Best of James Taylor (2003) for his highest-ranking album on chart, while both are peaked at number four.

== Track listings ==
All tracks written by James Taylor, except as noted.

Before This World — Standard edition
| No. | Title | Writer(s) | Length |
|---|---|---|---|
| 1. | "Today Today Today" | | 3:09 |
| 2. | "You and I Again" | | 3:52 |
| 3. | "Angels of Fenway" | | 3:18 |
| 4. | "Stretch of the Highway" | | 5:32 |
| 5. | "Montana" | | 3:25 |
| 6. | "Watchin' Over Me" | | 4:07 |
| 7. | "SnowTime" | | 5:48 |
| 8. | "Before This World / Jolly Springtime" (featuring Sting) | | 5:34 |
| 9. | "Far Afghanistan" | | 4:04 |
| 10. | "Wild Mountain Thyme" | Francis McPeake | 2:56 |
| Total length: | | | 41:45 |

Before This World — Bonus tracks for Target Exclusive
| No. | Title | Writer(s) | Length |
|---|---|---|---|
| 11. | "Pretty Boy Floyd" | Woody Guthrie | 5:10 |
| 12. | "I Can't Help It (If I'm Still in Love With You)" | Hank Williams | 3:53 |
| 13. | "Diamond Joe" | Traditional | 3:05 |

Before This World — Bonus CD for Limited edition deluxe book
| No. | Title | Writer(s) | Length |
|---|---|---|---|
| 1. | "9lb Hammer" (2015 Demo) | | 3:05 |
| 2. | "6/4 Shuffle" (2015 Instrumental) | | 2:42 |
| 3. | "Joshua Gone Barbados" (1983 unreleased recording) | Eric Von Schmidt | 4:04 |
| 4. | "Whenever You're Ready" (2003 Live Performance) | | 4:01 |
| 5. | "ShowTimeLine" (Evolution of the song "SnowTime") | | 9:31 |

Before This World — Bonus DVD for Deluxe edition
| No. | Title | Length |
|---|---|---|
| 1. | "There We Were: The Recording of James Taylor's 'Before This World'" | 30:00 |
| Total length: | | 30:00 |

Before This World — Bonus DVD for Limited edition deluxe book
| No. | Title | Length |
|---|---|---|
| 1. | "There We Were: The Recording of James Taylor's 'Before This World'" (expanded version) | 35:00 |
| Total length: | | 35:00 |

== Personnel ==
All songs feature James Taylor's All Star Band.

- James Taylor – vocals, acoustic guitars, hi-strung guitar, guitar synthesizer, harmonica, arrangements (10)
- Larry Goldings – acoustic piano, Fender Rhodes, Wurlitzer electric piano, organ, accordion, harmonium
- Michael Landau – electric guitars, nylon-string guitar
- Jimmy Johnson – bass
- Steve Gadd – drums
- Luis Conte – percussion
- Walt Fowler – handclaps (6)
- Andrea Zonn – fiddle, vocals
- Rajendra Prasanna – shehnai (9)
- David Lasley – vocals
- Kate Markowitz – vocals
- Arnold McCuller – vocals
- Caroline Taylor – vocals (3, 10)
- Henry Taylor – vocals (3, 10)
- Sting – vocals (8)

Brass, Horns and Strings

- Rob Mounsey – all arrangements and conductor, cello arrangements (2, 8)
- Andy Snitzer – brass and horn coordinator (4)
- JoAnn Tominaga – string contractor (7)
- Antoine Silverman – concertmaster (7)
- Michael Davis – euphonium (2), trombone (4)
- Tony Kadleck – flugelhorn (2)
- Larry Di Bello and David Peel – French horn (2)
- Roger Rosenberg – baritone saxophone (4)
- Lou Marini and Dave Mann – tenor saxophone (4)
- Randy Andos – trombone (4)
- Randy Brecker, Barry Danielian and Walt Fowler – trumpet (4)
- Yo-Yo Ma – cello (2, 8)
- Emily Brause and Peter Sachon – cello (7)
- Katharine Kresek and Philip Payton – viola (7)
- Jonathan Dinklage, Rachel Golub, Hiroko Taguchi, Entcho Todorov and Orlando Wells – violin (7)

=== Production ===
- Dave O'Donnell – producer, recording, mixing
- Rick Kwan – additional engineer
- Tyler Hartman, Tommy Joyner, Fernando Lodeiro, Scott Moore, Justin Rose and Jay Zubricky – assistant engineers
- Ted Jensen – mastering at Sterling Sound (New York, NY)
- Matthew Agoglia and Justin Shturtz – mastering assistants
- JoAnn Tominaga – production coordinator
- Ellyn Kusmin – senior production coordinator, additional photography
- Kevin Reagan – art direction, design
- Timothy White – photography
- James O'Mara, Daniel Stephens and Spencer Worthley – additional photography

== Charts ==
=== Weekly charts ===
| Chart (2015) | Peak position |
|---|---|
| Australian Albums (ARIA) | 12 |
| Belgian Albums (Ultratop Flanders) | 32 |
| Belgian Albums (Ultratop Wallonia) | 88 |
| Canadian Albums (Billboard) | 10 |
| Dutch Albums (Album Top 100) | 13 |
| German Albums (Offizielle Top 100) | 32 |
| Irish Albums (IRMA) | 11 |
| Italian Albums (FIMI) | 22 |
| Japanese Albums (Oricon) | 51 |
| New Zealand Albums (RMNZ) | 12 |
| Norwegian Albums (VG-lista) | 16 |
| Scottish Albums (OCC) | 3 |
| Spanish Albums (Promusicae) | 31 |
| Swiss Albums (Schweizer Hitparade) | 41 |
| UK Albums (OCC) | 4 |
| US Billboard 200 | 1 |

=== Year-end charts ===
| Chart (2015) | Position |
|---|---|
| US Billboard 200 | 115 |

== Release history ==
List of regions, release dates, editions, formats, labels and references
| Region | Date | Edition(s) | Format(s) | Label | References |
|---|---|---|---|---|---|
| United States | June 15, 2015 | Standard edition | Digital download | Concord Records | |
| United States | June 16, 2015 | Deluxe edition Limited edition deluxe book | CD; DVD; LP vinyl | Concord Records | |
| United Kingdom | June 15, 2015 | Standard edition | CD | Decca (UMO) | |
