= Other Covers =

EP by James Taylor
- Released: April 7, 2009
- Recorded: January 2008
- Genre: Rock
- Label: Hear Music
- Producer: Dave O'Donnell; James Taylor

James Taylor chronology
Covers (2008)	Other Covers (2009)	The Essential James Taylor (2013)

Other Covers is the second covers album by singer-songwriter James Taylor, released in April 2009 in the form of an EP and as a follow-up to the previous year's Covers.

== History ==
The songs on this mini-digipak CD were recorded during the same January 2008 Massachusetts barn sessions as Covers, and some of them had already been released as bonus tracks for that album.

== Track listing ==
1. "Oh, What a Beautiful Mornin'" (Richard Rodgers, Oscar Hammerstein II) – 3:10
2. "Get a Job" (The Silhouettes) – 4:07
3. "Memphis" (Chuck Berry) – 3:10
4. "Shiver Me Timbers" (Tom Waits) – 4:19
5. "Wasn't That a Mighty Storm?" (Traditional; arranged by Eric Von Schmidt) – 4:15
6. "In the Midnight Hour" (Wilson Pickett, Steve Cropper) – 3:14
7. "Knock on Wood" (Eddie Floyd, Steve Cropper) – 3:52

== Personnel ==
- James Taylor – lead vocals, guitar, harmonica
- Luis Conte – percussion
- Walt Fowler – trumpet, flugelhorn, additional keyboards
- Steve Gadd – drums
- Larry Goldings – piano, keyboards
- Jimmy Johnson – bass
- Michael Landau – lead guitar
- David Lasley – backing vocals
- Lou Marini Jr. – flute, clarinet, saxophones
- Kate Markowitz – backing vocals
- Arnold McCuller – backing vocals
- Andrea Zonn – violin, backing vocals

== Chart positions ==
Chart (2008)	Peak position
U.S. Billboard 200	122
