= Laurence Ballard =

American stage and screen actor

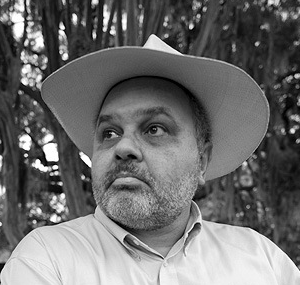
- Laurence Ballard; July 20, 2012
- Born: Larry Robert Bauer; July 2, 1954 (age 72); Oak Harbor, Washington, US
- Occupations: Actor, Director, Teacher
- Notable credit: Awarded a 1999 Fox Foundation Fellowship

Laurence Ballard (born July 2, 1954) is an American stage and screen actor, whose career has focused on regional theatre in the US.

== Stage credits ==
Ballard has appeared in nearly 250 productions in the past forty-five years, most recently as the spoken voice of Mr. Antrobus (played by Howie Seago) in Bartlett Sher's bilingual production of The Skin of Our Teeth. He has also performed in several productions directed by Bartlett Sher including the world premiere of The Singing Forest by Craig Lucas. Other productions include Tony Kushner's Homebody/Kabul; Bergman's Nora; Shaw's Arms and the Man; Shakespeare's Titus Andronicus; The Dying Gaul by Craig Lucas; and Goldoni's The Servant of Two Masters, all at the Intiman Playhouse. He has worked with several Seattle theatre companies, including ACT Theatre, The Empty Space, Seattle Rep and 5th Avenue Theatre.

Nationally, he has appeared at Arena Stage, Arizona Theatre Company, Berkeley Rep, Eureka Theatre, GeVa Theatre, Joyce Theatre, Milwaukee Rep, Oregon Shakespeare Festival, Portland Center Stage, San Jose Rep and StageWest, among others.

Internationally, he has trained and performed with Tadashi Suzuki’s SCOT company in Toga-mura, Mito City and Tokyo, Japan. He has collaborated with German artists on Brecht's, In the Jungle of Cities, and Swedes with Strindberg's A Dream Play.

He is also a director, helming productions for Seattle's ACT Theatre, the Washington State Arts Commission, Cornish College of the Arts, the University of Washington, among others.

From 1995 through 2002, Ballard taught at Seattle's Cornish College of the Arts Theater Department as an Adjunct Associate Professor.

== Television and film credits ==
His television and film credits include: Prefontaine (1997 movie), Mr. & Mrs. Smith (1996 television pilot), The Caine Mutiny Court-Martial (Robert Altman's 1988 TV movie), The Falcon, and The Tale of Lear.
