= Dave O'Donnell =

American record producer

- Occupations: Record producer, mixer, engineer
- Website: https://www.daveodonnell.com/

Dave O'Donnell is an American record producer, engineer and mixer, known for his work with James Taylor, Sheryl Crow, Bettye LaVette, Eric Clapton, Keith Richards, John Mayer, Lyle Lovett, Milton Nascimento, Keb' Mo' and Ray Charles.

In 1984, O'Donnell began work at Power Station studios in Manhattan, beginning as a runner and working his way up to engineer. During this period he worked with artists including Eric Clapton, Ian Hunter, Mick Ronson and Chic. He went on to work as a freelance record producer, engineer and mixer. In 2000, O'Donnell began a long-standing relationship with James Taylor and has since worked with him on five studio albums over the last 20 years.

== Awards ==
Grammy nominations

- 2015 - Best Engineered Album - James Taylor - Before This World - producer, engineer and mixer.
- 2007 - Best Engineered Album - Deborah Cox - Destination Moon - engineer
- 2006 - Album of The Year - John Mayer - Continuum - engineer
- 2003 - Best Engineered Album - Aaron Neville - Nature Boy - The Standards Album - engineer

Grammy wins

- 2020 - Best Traditional Pop Vocal Album - James Taylor - American Standard - producer, engineer, mixer
- 2010 - Best Jazz Vocal Album - Kurt Elling - Dedicated To You - mixer

TEC Award wins

- 2015 - "Record Production Album" - James Taylor - Before This World - producer, engineer and mixer
- 2008 - "TV Sound Production" - One Man Band - producer, engineer, mixer
- 2008 - "Surround Sound Production" - One Man Band - producer, engineer, mixer
- 2006 - "Record Production Album" - John Mayer - Continuum - engineer
- 2006 - "Record Production Single" - John Mayer - Waiting On The World To Change - engineer

Emmy nominations

- 2014 - "Outstanding Sound Mixing for a Variety Series or Special" - The Kennedy Center Honors' Music Tributes - mixer
- 2009 - "Outstanding Achievement in Live and Direct to Tape Sound Mixing" - We Are One - The Obama Inaugural Celebration - engineer, mixer

== Selected works ==
- 2020 - Sheryl Crow - Woman in the White House - mixing engineer, recording
- 2020 - Sheryl Crow - In the End - mixing engineer, recording
- 2020 - Josh Groban Harmony - Engineer, Mixing
- 2020 - Bettye LaVette - Blackbirds - engineer, mixing, recording
- 2020 - James Taylor - American Standard - producer, engineer, mixer
- 2019 - Sheryl Crow - Threads - engineer, mixer
- 2019 - Clark Beckham "I Need" - mixer
- 2018 - Bettye LaVette - Things Have Changed - engineer, mixer
- 2016 - Keith Urban - "Gone Tomorrow" - engineer
- 2015 - Keith Richards - Crosseyed Heart - engineer, mixer
- 2015 - James Taylor- Before This World - producer, engineer, mixer
- 2015 - Boz Scaggs - "Rich Woman" - mixer
- 2014 - Smokey Robinson - "Ain't That Peculiar" - producer, engineer, mixer
- 2014 - Henry Butler & Steve Bernstein - Vipers Drag - engineer, mixer
- 2013 - Katy Perry - "Birthday" - engineer
- 2013 - Heart - "Stairway To Heaven" - mixer
- 2013 - Ray Charles - "None of Us Are Free" - mixer
- 2012 - K'naan ft. Keith Richards - K'naan ft. Keith Richards - "Sleep When I Die" - engineer
- 2012 - Fiorella Mannoia - Sud - mixer
- 2011 - Kelly Clarkson - "Why Don't You Try" - engineer
- 2009 - James Taylor - Other Covers - producer, engineer, mixer
- 2009 - Kurt Elling - Dedicated To You - mixer
- 2009 - Benny Reid - Escaping Shadows - engineer
- 2008 - James Taylor - Covers - engineer
- 2007 - Eric Clapton & Keith Richards - "Key to The Highway" - mixer
- 2007 - Kurt Elling - Nightmoves - engineer
- 2007 - Patti Scialfa - Play It As It Lays - engineer
- 2007 - James Taylor - One Man Band - producer, engineer, mixer
- 2006 - John Mayer - Continuum - engineer
- 2006 - Skye Edwards - "What's Wrong With Me?" - producer, remix
- 2005 - John Mayer - The Village Sessions - mixer
- 2005 - Burt Bacharach - At This Time - engineer
- 2004 - Circo - En el Cielo de Tu Boca - mixer
- 2004 - Volume Cero - Estelar - mixer
- 2003 - Aaron Neville - Nature Boy - engineer
- 2003 - Kronos Quartet with Astor Piazzola - Five Tango Sensations - mixer
- 2003 - Lyle Lovett - "G.T.O." - engineer, mixer
- 2002 - Jimmy Buffett - Far Side of The World - engineer, mixer
- 2002 - Deep Purple - "Hush" - mixer
- 2000 - James Taylor - October Road - engineer, mixer
- 2000 - Lyle Lovett - "What I'd Say?" - engineer, mixer
- 2000 - Keb' Mo' - The Door - engineer, mixer
- 1999 - Lyle Lovett - "Summer Wind" - engineer, mixer
- 1998 - Milton Nascimento - Tambores De Minas - mixer
- 1997 - Milton Nascimento - Nascimento - engineer, mixer
- 1992 - Chic - Chic-ism - engineer, mixer
- 1989 - Tina Turner - Foreign Affair - engineer
- 1989 - Eric Clapton - Journeyman - engineer
- 1989 - Ian Hunter & Mick Ronson - Yui Orta

== Awards and discography references ==
- Dave O'Donnell Awards
- Dave O'Donnell Discography
