= The Potting Shed =

1957 play by Graham Greene

First production programme

The Potting Shed is a 1957 play by Graham Greene in three acts. The psychological drama centres on a secret held by the Callifer family for nearly thirty years.

== Plot ==
The patriarch of the family is dying and James, his estranged son, appears unexpectedly. He can remember nothing about a mysterious moment that occurred in the family's potting shed when he was age 14. Family members who recall the event are unwilling to describe it to him. With the help of a psychoanalyst, James tries to recall just what happened that day that left him rejected by his father, alienated from his family, and alone in the world.

== Theatre productions ==
The Broadway production was directed by Carmen Capalbo. It opened on 29 January 1957 at the Bijou Theatre and later moved to the John Golden Theatre to complete its run of 143 performances. Robert Flemyng starred as James Callifer and Sybil Thorndike, Frank Conroy, Leueen MacGrath, Joan Croydon, Lewis Casson, and Carol Lynley were cast in supporting roles.

The Potting Shed was first produced in London on 5 February 1958 at the Globe Theatre, directed by Michael Macowan, and starring Walter Hudd, Sarah Long, Lockwood West, John Gielgud, Peter Illing, Redmond Phillips.

The third act of the play differed between the 1957 American and 1958 British productions. An author's note in the British edition of the published play (William Heinemann, 1958) states:

The Potting Shed was produced in New York in 1957 with a different third act which appears in the American edition of the play. For the English production, we have reverted to the last act as it was originally written and this is the only version authorised for Great Britain.

Greene never was pleased with the third act and rewrote it during rehearsals of the American production; he changed it back to the original script for the British premiere.

Time wrote "The play's emotional power derives from its harassed outcries and silences, from very human bafflements and needs, from a truly serious man's intensities and jocosities alike...for two acts, culminating in a superbly dramatic revelation scene, The Potting Shed, by its writing and storytelling alike, more and more grips and stirs its audience."

It was revived at the Finborough Theatre in early 2011.

== Awards and nominations ==
- 1957 Tony Award for Best Play (nominee)
- 1957 Tony Award for Best Actress in a Play (Sybil Thorndike, nominee)
- 1957 Tony Award for Best Actor in a Play (Frank Conroy, winner)
- 1956–57 Theatre World Award (Carol Lynley, winner)

== Screen adaptations ==
In 1961, Paul Bogart directed the play for the television series The Play of the Week. Frank Conroy reprised his Broadway role. The cast included John Baragrey as James Callifer and Ludwig Donath, Ann Harding, Fritz Weaver, and Nancy Wickwire in supporting roles.

A 1981 television production of the play was written by Pat Sandys and produced by Yorkshire Television for the London Weekend Television series Celebrity Playhouse. The cast, directed by David Cunliffe, included Paul Scofield as James Callifer and Anna Massey, Maurice Denham, Celia Johnson, David Swift, Allan Cuthbertson, and Cyril Luckham.
