= One Man Band (James Taylor album) =

Live album by James Taylor
- Released: November 13, 2007
- Recorded: July 19–21, 2007
- Venue: Colonial Theatre, Pittsfield, Massachusetts
- Genre: Folk; country
- Length: 77:51
- Label: Hear Music
- Producer: James Taylor; Dave O'Donnell

James Taylor chronology
James Taylor at Christmas (2006)	One Man Band (2007)	Covers (2008)

Professional ratings
Review scores
Source	Rating
AllMusic	3.5/5 stars
BBC	(favourable)
Rolling Stone	3.5/5 stars
The Rolling Stone Album Guide	3.5/5 stars

One Man Band is a live album by American singer-songwriter James Taylor that was released in November 2007 on Hear Music. It was recorded over several days at the Colonial Theatre in Pittsfield, Massachusetts.

== Background ==
The premise for One Man Band is that instead of having a wide array of instruments, as with most concerts, Taylor is accompanied by only his guitar and Larry Goldings on piano, organ, and bass. There are some exceptions, such as the pre-recorded Tanglewood Festival Chorus sings on "My Traveling Star" and "Shower the People". Also, a "drum machine" (in this case, a large mechanical device that physically plays drums) made by Taylor and his friend Gordon Fairfield appears on "Slap Leather" and "Chili Dog".

The digital discrete 5.1 surround sound mix of One Man Band won a TEC Award for best surround sound recording in 2008.

== Release ==
In 2007, it was also released a 2CD/1DVD quad-fold digipak special edition of One Man Band including a 2-hour 19-song live concert DVD directed and produced by Don Mischer. In 2009, the DVD was released separately from the 2CD edition.

== Track listing ==
All tracks are written by James Taylor, except where noted.

No.	Title	Writer(s)	Length
1.	"Something in the Way She Moves"		3:47
2.	"Never Die Young"		4:24
3.	"The Frozen Man"		5:07
4.	"Mean Old Man"		3:42
5.	"School Song"	Larry Goldings	1:28
6.	"Country Road"		4:08
7.	"Slap Leather"		3:07
8.	"My Traveling Star"		4:11
9.	"You've Got a Friend"	Carole King	5:02
10.	"Steamroller Blues"		5:59
11.	"Secret O' Life"		3:42
12.	"Line 'Em Up"		4:39
13.	"Chili Dog"		1:50
14.	"Shower the People"		4:56
15.	"Sweet Baby James"		3:41
16.	"Carolina in My Mind"		5:04
17.	"Fire and Rain"		4:52
18.	"Copperline"	Taylor; Reynolds Price	4:52
19.	"You Can Close Your Eyes"		3:08
Total length:			77:51
