= Warner Shook =

American stage director

- Occupation: Director

Warner Shook is an American theatre director and actor.

== Biography ==
Raised in Alabama, Shook's father was a mining magnate that left Shook and his sister each a small fortune. Shook had a brief career as an actor appearing in George A. Romero's Dawn of the Dead, Knightriders and Creepshow. Turning to directing, Shook worked at San Francisco's American Conservatory Theater, the Old Globe Theatre in San Diego, and the Mark Taper Forum in L.A.

In 1993, Shook was named the artistic director of Seattle's Intiman Theatre, a post he held until 1999. Shook directed The Kentucky Cycle which made its world premiere at the Intiman Theater, before moving onto the Mark Taper Forum and eventually Broadway. The production won a Pulitzer Prize for drama in 1992. Shook has also directed productions of Enchanted April, Lillian Hellman's The Little Foxes, and Edward Albee's The Goat, or Who Is Sylvia?.

On television, Shook has directed episodes of Tales from the Darkside and Monsters.
