= A Grand Night for Singing =

1993 musical revue of Rodgers and Hammerstein

- Logo for Broadway. Logo for original cabaret production at www.AGrandNightForSinging.com
- Music: Richard Rodgers
- Lyrics: Oscar Hammerstein II
- Book: Walter Bobbie created the sequence of songs. There is no script.
- Basis: A Grand Night For Singing - The Rodgers & Hammerstein Revue at Rainbow & Stars (www.AGrandNightForSinging.com)
- Premiere: March 2, 1993: Rainbow & Stars
- Productions: 1993 Cabaret; 1993 Broadway

A Grand Night for Singing is a musical revue showcasing the music of Richard Rodgers and the lyrics of Oscar Hammerstein II. The show had an original cabaret production and a subsequent Broadway engagement where it was nominated for two Tony® Awards.

Featuring songs from Carousel, Oklahoma!, The King and I, South Pacific, Cinderella, The Sound of Music, Allegro, Me and Juliet, State Fair, Pipe Dream and Flower Drum Song, it originally was presented at Rainbow & Stars, the cabaret venue at The Rainbow Room restaurant atop Rockefeller Center.

The original production titled, "A Grand Night For Singing! The Rodgers & Hammerstein Revue Celebrating the 50th Anniversary of their Historic Collaboration," (www.AGrandNightForSinging.com) ran for 1 preview plus 60 performances from March 2, 1993 to April 10, 1993 at Rainbow & Stars where The New York Times called the show a "radiant new revue" and a "musical masterstroke." This original production starred Victoria Clark, Jason Graae, Martin Vidnovic, Lynne Wintersteller, and Karen Ziemba with musical direction by Fred Wells and direction by Walter Bobbie. It was part of a ten year series of musical revues conceived and produced by Gregory Dawson, Steve Paul, and Scott Perrin which saluted Cole Porter, Rodgers & Hart (starring Elaine Stritch and Margaret Whiting), Irving Berlin (starring Kaye Ballard), the Gershwins (starring JoAnne Worley), Julie Styne, Lerner & Loewe, Leonard Bernstein, and the R&B and pop eras (starring Marianne Faithfull and Darlene Love).

During the six week run at Rainbow & Stars, the United States Postmaster General introduced the Rodgers & Hammerstein 50th Anniversary commemorative postage stamp at a luncheon in The Rainbow Room. At the start of that luncheon, the original surrey with the fringe on top with two white horses - as described in the lyric of the Broadway musical, Oklahoma! - greeted guests at the Rockefeller Plaza entrance to The Rainbow Room. The publicist for the show, David Lotz, created a notable press release for that occasion with the headline, "Whoa! Here Come Those High-Steppin' Strutters!" In conjunction with all the festivities, there was significant national press attention commemorating the anniversary.

After 41 previews, the Broadway production, directed by Walter Bobbie and choreographed by Pamela Sousa, with vocal arrangements by Fred Wells and orchestrations by Michael Gibson and Jonathan Tunick, opened on November 17, 1993, at the Criterion Center Stage Right, where it ran for 52 performances. Victoria Clark, Jason Graae, Alyson Reed, Martin Vidnovic, and Lynne Wintersteller comprised the cast. Martin Vidnovic was replaced by Gregg Edelman on the cast recording and some later performances.

The Broadway engagement was nominated for two Tony Awards: Best Musical and Best Book of a Musical. It is the only production in Broadway history to be nominated for Best Book of a Musical that has no script - there are no spoken words. It is also the only revue in history to be nominated for Best Book of a Musical since revues are generally not eligible for awards that require a narrative framework. So, the nomination for Best Book of a Musical was in recognition of the sequence of songs. The show was also nominated for the Drama Desk Award for Outstanding Revue.

An original cast archival recording of the Rainbow & Stars production is available at www.AGrandNightForSinging.com. An original cast recording of the Broadway version was released by Varèse Sarabande.

== Song list ==
Act I

- "Carousel Waltz" (from Carousel)
- "So Far" (from Allegro)
- "It's a Grand Night for Singing" (from State Fair)
- "The Surrey with the Fringe on Top" (from Oklahoma!)
- "Stepsisters' Lament" (from Cinderella)
- "We Kiss in a Shadow" (from The King and I)
- "Hello, Young Lovers" (from The King and I)
- "A Wonderful Guy" (from South Pacific)
- "I Cain't Say No" (from Oklahoma!)
- "Maria" (from The Sound of Music)
- "Do I Love You Because You're Beautiful?" (from Cinderella)
- "Honey Bun" (from South Pacific")
- "The Gentleman is a Dope" (from Allegro)
- "Don't Marry Me" (from Flower Drum Song)
- "I'm Gonna Wash That Man Right Outa My Hair" (from South Pacific)
- "If I Loved You" (from Carousel)
- "Shall We Dance?" (from The King and I)
- "That's The Way It Happens" (from Me and Juliet)
- "All at Once You Love Her" (from Pipe Dream)
- "Some Enchanted Evening" (from South Pacific)

Act II

- "Oh, What a Beautiful Mornin'" (from Oklahoma!)
- "Wish Them Well" (from Allegro)
- "The Man I Used to Be" (from Pipe Dream)
- "It Might as Well Be Spring" (from State Fair)
- "Kansas City" (from Oklahoma!)
- "When the Children Are Asleep" (from Carousel)
- "I Know It Can Happen Again" (from Allegro)
- "My Little Girl" (from Carousel)
- "It's Me" (from Me and Juliet)
- "Love, Look Away" (from Flower Drum Song)
- "When You're Driving Through the Moonlight" (from Cinderella)
- "A Lovely Night" (from Cinderella)
- "Something Wonderful" (from The King and I)
- "This Nearly Was Mine" (from South Pacific)
- "Impossible" (from Cinderella)
- "I Have Dreamed" (from The King and I)

== Awards and nominations ==
=== Original Broadway production ===
Year	Award	Category	Nominee	Result
1994	Tony Award	Best Musical		Nominated
1994	Tony Award	Best Book of a Musical	Walter Bobbie	Nominated
1994	Drama Desk Award	Outstanding Revue		Nominated
