= Abraham Lincoln's farewell address =

1861 speech upon leaving Springfield, Illinois

- Part of Presidency of Abraham Lincoln
- 1860 campaign lithograph titled "Hon. Abraham Lincoln of Illinois," depicting him clean-shaven around the period he lived in Springfield.
- Date: February 11, 1861
- Location: Great Western Railroad Depot, Springfield, Illinois, U.S.
- Participants: Abraham Lincoln (President-elect, speaker); Citizens of Springfield, Illinois (Audience)
- Outcome: Emotional public farewell to his home state neighbors; Set an somber, spiritual tone for his journey into a nation on the brink of civil war; Extemporaneous remarks recorded in multiple widely circulated variations

Alternate version of Abraham Lincoln's Farewell Address, published by The American News Company

Abraham Lincoln's farewell address was a speech made by President-elect Abraham Lincoln in Springfield, Illinois on February 11, 1861. The speech was one of Lincoln's most emotional, as he and the public knew there were tremendous challenges ahead and it was uncertain when he would ever return to Springfield. The demands of the Civil War and his assassination in 1865 ensured that Lincoln never returned to Springfield alive after this address.

== The speech ==
On February 11, 1861, several thousand citizens of Springfield, Illinois gathered at the train depot to see Lincoln depart for his inauguration in Washington, D.C. In response, he gave this brief, impromptu speech from his railroad car, in the middle of a heavy rainstorm:

My friends, no one, not in my situation, can appreciate my feeling of sadness at this parting. To this place and the kindness of these people, I owe everything. Here I have lived a quarter of a century, and have passed from a young to an old man. Here my children have been born, and one is buried. I now leave, not knowing when, or whether ever, I may return, with a task before me greater than that which rested upon Washington. Without the assistance of that Divine Being who ever attended him, I cannot succeed. With that assistance I cannot fail. Trusting in Him who can go with me, and remain with you, and be everywhere for good, let us confidently hope that all will yet be well. To His care commending you, as I hope in your prayers you will commend me, I bid you an affectionate farewell.

== Versions ==
The speech moved members of his entourage so much that after the train started, he was asked to put his words into writing. Because of the difficulty of doing so on a moving train, Lincoln asked his personal secretary, John Nicolay, to finish copying it down after a few sentences. Three contemporary versions of the speech exist: the one penned on the train, one published the next day in the Illinois State Journal, and one published on February 23 in Harper's Weekly.

== Reception ==
The farewell speech was one of Lincoln's most emotional. Lincoln understood that he might not make it back to Springfield, as his election had already caused multiple states to secede from the Union, and the American Civil War would soon begin. Lincoln feared assassination before he was even sworn in (such fears led to the uncovering of the alleged Baltimore Plot). Lincoln's farewell address was truly his last farewell to Springfield: he would never again be in the city alive due to his assassination. He would return to the city in a casket after a long memorial train ride for his funeral and burial.

== See also ==
- 1860 United States presidential election
- Gettysburg Address
- Presidency of Abraham Lincoln
- Religious views of Abraham Lincoln
