= Lincoln Depot =

- U.S. National Register of Historic Places
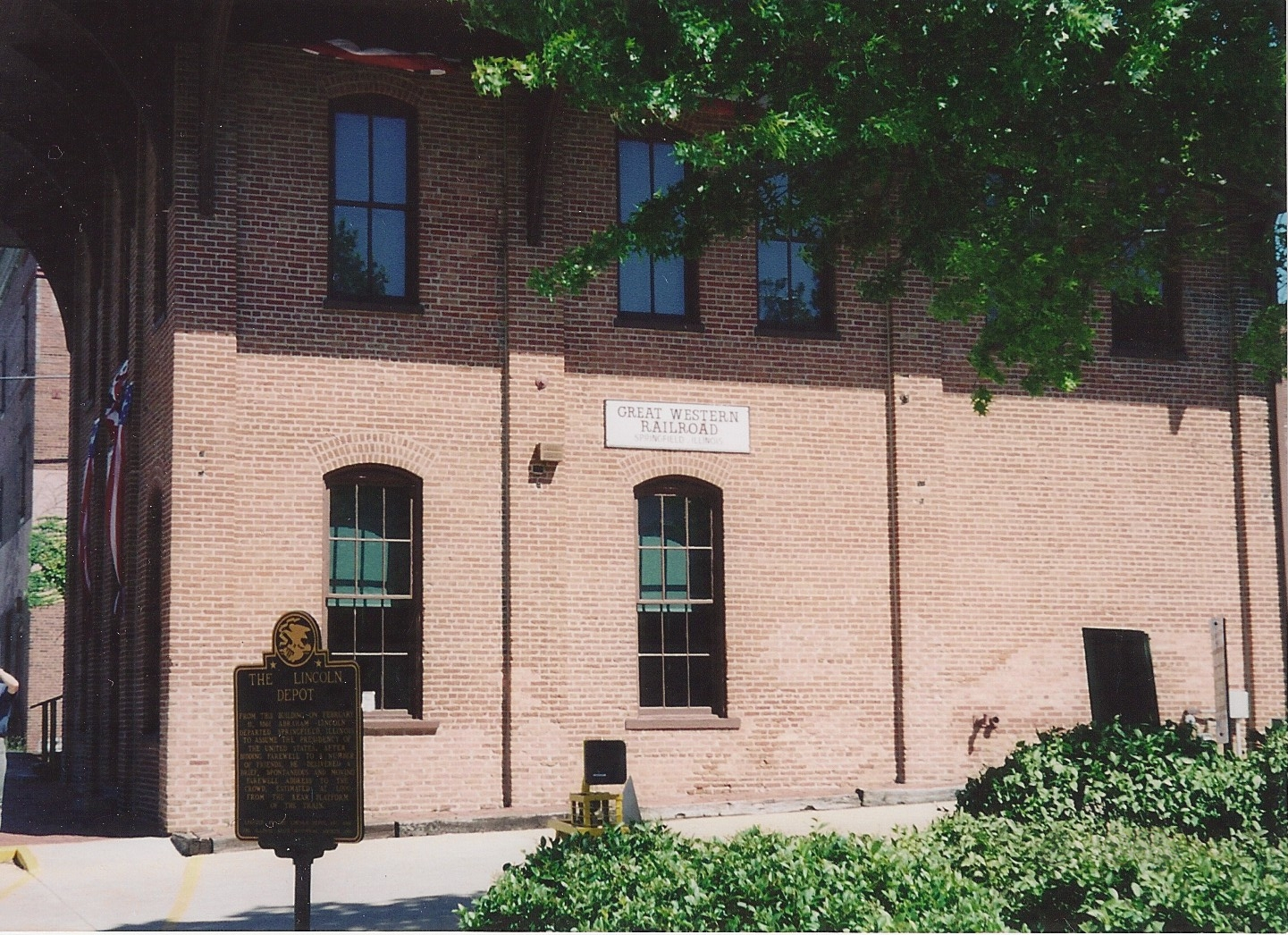
- The Lincoln Depot as seen in August 2004

- Location within Illinois Location within the United States
- Location: 930 E. Monroe St., Springfield, Illinois
- Coordinates: 39°47′57″N 89°38′33″W
- Area: less than one acre (4,000 m^{2})
- Built: 1852
- Architectural style: Italianate
- NRHP reference No.: 14000510
- Added to NRHP: August 25, 2014

Lincoln Depot is located in Springfield, Illinois. It is so called because Abraham Lincoln's bittersweet 1861 Farewell Address to Springfield was delivered here as he boarded the train to Washington D.C. at the beginning of his presidency.

== History ==
The depot was constructed by The Great Western Railroad in 1852. It was damaged by fire in 1857, which required extensive remodeling. The Great Western Railroad merged with several other small railroads to form the Toledo, Wabash, and Western Railroad, which later became the Wabash Railroad. The company moved its Springfield passenger operations to a building located at Tenth and Washington Streets and operated the old building as a freight house. A second story was added in 1900.

The Depot was sold when the Wabash consolidated its operations in Decatur, Illinois. The building housed a variety of businesses, and was used as a warehouse or storage space. It was purchased by a local group in the 1960s with the intention of restoring it as a historic site. This group operated the Depot as a museum from 1965 to 1976. Displays included a mix of artifacts, including Lincoln and non-Lincoln items.

Fire again damaged the building in December 1968. Arson was suspected in the severely damaged building, but was not proven. Some parts of the structure, dating to Lincoln's time, survived.

The building was again restored, and Sangamon State University operated the Depot from 1977 to 1980. The operation was financed through a grant from the National Endowment for the Humanities. With the renovations, the University implemented a new purpose for the site. Though still operated as a museum, it was also used as training in site management and interpretation for History majors.

The University had to discontinue operations due to lack of funding. Copley Press, owners of the depot and the immediately neighboring State Journal-Register newspaper, took on the management of the building. The building was purchased by local attorney Jon Gray Noll in 2012. After extensive renovation, the Noll Law Office moved its operation to the mezzanine and 2nd floor in March, 2013. The first floor has reopened as a tourist site. It is now operated by the combined efforts of The Noll Law Office and the Lincoln Home National Historic Site. The National Park Service Rangers provide interpretation during the open season.

== Lincoln ==
The depot, located just two blocks from the Lincoln Home, was the location from which Lincoln gave his Farewell Address to his fellow Springfield citizens. On a dark, gloomy morning in 1861, citizens of Springfield assembled at the station to see Lincoln off. The office was used as a reception room, and his friends and neighbors filed past, taking his hand. As the train pulled in, he mounted the rear platform. Before his journey to Washington D.C., he delivered an impromptu and emotional farewell address.

A video, narrated by Scott Simon, is shown on the second floor. It describes Lincoln's 12-day journey to Washington.

On the anniversary of Abraham Lincoln's birth in 1956, the Depot was used as a backdrop for a reenactment of Lincoln's farewell to Springfield. Lincoln was portrayed by G. William Horsley of Springfield.

The speech was recalled by Lincoln's Washington DC pastor at his funeral on April 19, 1865: "I speak what I know, and testify what I have often heard him say, when I affirm that that guidance and mercy were the props on which he humbly and habitually leaned; they were the best hope he had for himself and for his country. Hence, when he was leaving his home in Illinois, and coming to this city to take his seat in the executive chair of a disturbed and troubled nation, he said to the old and tried friends who gathered tearfully around him and bade him farewell, "I leave you with this request: pray for me." They did pray for him; and millions of other people prayed for him; nor did they pray in vain. Their prayer was heard, and the answer appears in all his subsequent history; it shines forth with a heavenly radiance in the whole course and tenor of his administration, from its commencement to its close. God raised him up for a great and glorious mission, furnished him for his work, and aided him in its accomplishment."

== Historic Site ==
A historical marker was erected at the station in 1966. It is located at the intersection of Monroe Street and 10th Street. It reads:

"From this building on February 11, 1861 Abraham Lincoln departed Springfield, Illinois to assume the Presidency of the United States. After bidding farewell to a number of friends, he delivered a brief, spontaneous and moving farewell address to the crowd, estimated at 1,000, from the rear platform of the train."

Marker series. This marker is included in the Lincoln 1861 Inaugural Train Stops marker series.

The depot was added to the National Register of Historic Places on August 25, 2014.

Preceding station	Wabash Railroad	Following station
Hazel Dell toward Kansas City	Main Line via Hannibal	Dawson toward Chicago
