= Jeanne Paulsen =

American, Tony Award-nominated actress

- Education: University of California, San Diego (MFA)

Jeanne Paulsen is an American, Tony Award-nominated actress. She has appeared extensively at the Intiman Theatre where she has appeared in Aristocrats, Faith Healer, Angels in America, The Little Foxes, The Last Night of Ballyhoo and The Kentucky Cycle. Paulsen has also spent seven seasons as part of the resident acting company at the Oregon Shakespeare Festival.

On Broadway she received a 1994 Tony nomination for The Kentucky Cycle, directed by Warner Shook, and played Ann Putnam in The Crucible, directed by Richard Eyre.

She has appeared in Death of a Salesman at Geva Theatre and McNeal at the Milwaukee Rep; other regional credits include work at Arizona Theatre Company (A Moon for the Misbegotten, Copenhagen), La Jolla Playhouse, Mark Taper Forum, and at the South Coast Repertory where she received a L.A. Drama Critic's Circle Award for Rose in Holy Days. Paulsen has also appeared at theaters such as Denver Center, Long Wharf Theatre, Berkeley Rep, and the American Conservatory Theater. Her television credits include stints on Law & Order, Breaking Free, and Promised Land.

She has an M.F.A. from the graduate acting program at UCSD.
