= State Fair =

A state fair is a competitive and recreational gathering in the United States. It may also refer to:

- State Fair (novel), a 1932 novel by Phil Stong
  - State Fair (1933 film), based on the novel
  - State Fair (1945 film), a musical remake
    - State Fair (album), a 1946 album by Dick Haymes featuring songs from the film
  - State Fair (1962 film), a remake of the musical version
  - State Fair (1976 film), a television pilot loosely based upon the novel
  - State Fair (musical), a 1996 musical play based upon the Stong novel
- State Fair, a neighborhood in Detroit, Michigan
- State Fair (song), a single by country music singer Doug Supernaw on his 1994 album Deep Thoughts from a Shallow Mind
