= State Fair (musical) =

- Original Broadway poster (1996)
- Music: Richard Rodgers
- Lyrics: Oscar Hammerstein II
- Book: Tom Briggs; Louis Mattioli
- Basis: State Fair by Richard Fielder; State Fair by Richard L. Breen; Oscar Hammerstein II; Sonya Levien; Paul Green; State Fair by Oscar Hammerstein II; Sonya Levien; Paul Green; State Fair by Sonya Levien; Paul Green; State Fair by Phil Stong
- Productions: 1969 The Muny; 1992 North Carolina; 1996 Broadway

State Fair is a musical with a book by Tom Briggs and Louis Mattioli, lyrics by Oscar Hammerstein II, and music by Richard Rodgers.

Phil Stong's original 1932 novel, State Fair, was first adapted for film in 1933 in a production starring Will Rogers. In 1945, the film was remade as a musical with original songs by Rodgers and Hammerstein. This was subsequently remade in 1962 as well as adapted into a made-for-television movie in 1976. The stage production closely follows the plot of its predecessors, providing a glimpse into the life of a farming family, the Frakes, and their three-day adventure at the Iowa State Fair in Des Moines in 1946. While parents Abel and Melissa are hoping to win a few blue ribbons, siblings Margy and Wayne are more interested in finding romance on the midway.

== Production history ==
In 1969, The Muny in St. Louis presented the world stage premiere of State Fair starring Ozzie and Harriet Nelson with Ron Husmann, Jerry Lanning, Bonnie Schon, Carol Richards, Jack Goode, Tom Pedi, Tommy Tune and Lawrence Leritz in the children's chorus. The production was directed by James Hammerstein, supervised by Richard Rodgers and also choreographed by Tommy Tune. Additional songs included in this production were three from "Me & Juliet"; "It's Me!", "Keep It Gay" and "Marriage Type Love" and a new one, "Away From Home."

In 1992 a new stage adaptation, by Tom Briggs and Louis Mattioli, was produced as part of the Broadway Preview Series at the North Carolina School of the Arts, and was directed and choreographed by Randy Skinner. The show played at the Stevens Center in Winston-Salem from July 17 – August 16, 1992. From North Carolina, the show moved to Long Beach Civic Light Opera in October 1992.

A re-staging of the 1992 version played on Broadway at the Music Box Theater opening March 27, 1996, following to a 23-city tour inaugurated with an engagement at the real Iowa State Fair August 12–20, 1995. The final credit for iconic Broadway producer David Merrick, the 1995-1996 production of State Fair was co-directed by James Hammerstein (Oscar's son) and Randy Skinner, with the latter doubling as choreographer. The set design was by James Leonard Joy, the costume design by Michael Bottari and Ronald Case, and the lighting design was by Natasha Katz. Headlined by John Davidson as Abel, Kathryn Crosby as Melissa, and Andrea McArdle and Ben Wright as Margy and Wayne, the production also starred Donna McKechnie as Emily and Scott Wise as Pat. When McArdle was sidelined by a foot injury incurred onstage June 5, she was replaced by Susan Egan who had played Margy in the 1992 tryout tour of State Fair. The 1996 production received 1996 Tony Award nominations for Best Score and Best Featured Actor in a Musical for Scott Wise. It also received three Drama Desk nominations for Best Featured Actor in a Musical for Scott Wise and Ben Wright and Best Featured Actress in a Musical for Donna McKechnie. A box-office disappointment, the Broadway production of State Fair closed June 20, 1996, after 118 performances at the Music Box. On September 7, 1997, a second tour of the production had its premiere engagement at the Eisenhower Auditorium a Pennsylvania State University. Headlined by John Davidson as Abel Frake, this reportedly scaled-down production toured for eight months.

The Walnut Street Theatre in Philadelphia hosted a production of State Fair September 10-October 19, 2008, which starred Mark Jacoby and Dee Hoty as Abel and Melissa Frake. Tim Dunleavy of TalkinBroadway.com rated the production as "good [and] consistently enjoyable. [This version of State Fair] may not be a classic [but] proves to be a real charmer [with] a tone that is sweet, but not too sugary. There may not be much depth to [this] production… but there's nothing cloying or embarrassing about it either. It's got great songs, some funny lines, a terrific cast and a gently nostalgic look at a bygone era.

On August 3, 2010, the Finborough Theatre production opened at London's West End Trafalgar Studios 2, directed by Thom Southerland and starring Philip Rham, Karl Clarkson, Laura Main and Susan Travers, in a transfer from the 2009 Finborough production. The show opened to generally positive reviews with The Guardian quoting "It's a great night out, and as exhilarating as a hoedown". Due to demand the run was extended two weeks to September 11, 2010. The musical had initially opened at the Finborough Theatre in August 2009, with Magnus Gilljam as musical director and pianist. The Guardian reviewer wrote of the 2009 production: "It may not be one of the great musicals, but, in its melodic paean to middle America, I found this infinitely more enjoyable than some of Rodgers and Hammerstein's later, tendentious excursions into east-west politics."

== Plot ==
Act I

It is a Tuesday afternoon in summer 1946 on the Frake family farm in Brunswick, Iowa, as the family prepares to leave for the Iowa State Fair. The family patriarch, Abel, is hoping that his prized boar, Blue Boy, will win the livestock sweepstakes. Abel's wife, Melissa, has her heart set on ribbons for her mincemeat and sour pickles, while their son, Wayne, is practicing throwing hoops, hoping to win prizes from the midway games (“Opening (Our State Fair)”). Wayne is suddenly saddened when he learns that his girlfriend, Eleanor, was accepted to college, and she cannot go to the fair with him.

Local shopkeeper Dave Miller is skeptical about the family's hopes. He makes a $5 bet that something is bound to go wrong for Blue Boy or the family. Abel accepts. Meanwhile, the Frakes' daughter, Margy, is feeling down and doesn't understand why (“It Might as Well Be Spring”). Her boyfriend, Harry, arrives at the farm and presses her for an answer to his marriage proposal; she agrees to give him an answer when she returns home. That night, the family leaves for the fair, awaiting the surprises that lie ahead (“Driving at Night/Our State Fair”).

After arriving at the fair on Wednesday morning, Wayne heads straight for the midway, where he is hustled by a carnie at a ring-throwing game. A beautiful mysterious woman defends on Wayne's behalf, and he falls head over heels in love before he even knows her name (“That’s for Me”). Later that afternoon, Abel and his farmer buddies are at the beer tent and trading stories about their prized pigs (“More Than Just a Friend”). Meanwhile, Pat Gilbert, a former World War II reporter, arrives with Charlie, a photographer, to cover the fair for the Des Moines Register. He runs into Margy, whom he repeatedly tries to court, and she remains forbidding until he begins to win her over (“Isn't It Kinda Fun?”). That night, Wayne heads to the Starlight Dance Meadow in time to catch a show. The performer is a singer named Emily Arden, who happens to be the woman he met earlier in the day (“You Never Had it So Good”). She buys him a drink, and tells Wayne that her dream is to become a Broadway star. He charmingly asks her out. She agrees, but only on the bounds that their relationship only lasts for the rest of the fair.

Thursday morning arrives and Margy complains to Melissa about Harry (“It Might as Well Be Spring (Reprise)”). Abel walks in, overjoyed at the promise of victory and winning, and he proposes an evening of fun and dancing with his family (“When I Go Out Walking With My Baby”). At the Exhibit Hall that afternoon, the pickles and mincemeat are being judged. Unknowingly, Abel spiked Melissa's with a full bottle of brandy, sending the judges into a drunken fit of giggles and tipsiness. Melissa wins the blue ribbon and a special plaque. Pat and Charlie capture the euphoric moment. From a quiet hillside, Wayne and Emily watch the midway below. He wants to further continue their relationship, telling her that they have so many more memories to make, but she remains unsettled (“So Far”). At the Starlight Dance Meadow that night, fairgoers gather for a dreamy waltz. Abel and Melissa dance romantically, Wayne and Emily arrive with a distinctive glow, and Pat and Margy share a passionate kiss when, to Margy's shock, Harry arrives at the fair (“A Grand Night for Singing”).

Act II

It is now Friday, the last day of the fair. Despite Harry's presence, Pat and Margy are growing closer and more in love. While walking the midway alone, Pat runs into Jeanne and Vivian, two dancers whom he formerly shared intimate relationships with. They both try to flirt with him, but they notice that Pat has changed, as he admits that he has finally found real love (“The Man I Used to Be”). Blue Boy is declared the winner of the livestock sweepstakes, and the livestock tent turns into a celebration led by Abel (“All I Owe Ioway”). Afterwards, Charlie tells Pat that he has landed a job interview with the Chicago Tribune, but it would mean catching the first train out of Iowa (“The Man I Used to Be (Reprise)”). Reluctant to leave Margy in the high point, he leaves just as she arrives for their night out (“Isn't it Kinda Fun? (Reprise)”).

The scene shifts to the Starlight Dance Meadow for the closing performance of the fair, headlined by Emily (“That’s the Way It Happens”). Wayne proclaims his love for Emily that night, but she breaks it off, revealing that she is married and was abandoned by her husband, making her scared to fall in love again. Back at the campsite, Abel and Melissa are watching the stars together. Melissa is concerned about the children growing up too fast, but Abel assures her that they raised Wayne and Margy well, and that when the children do move out, the couple will always be there for each other (“Boys and Girls Like You and Me”). On the darkened midway, the fair is over, and being dismantled. Margy is waiting for Pat, remembering that he said he wouldn't break it off, he just wouldn't be around (“The Next Time it Happens”). Harry enters, pleading to Margy for her hand in marriage, though her refusal finally leads him to realize that she simply just doesn't love him.

Upon returning to the family farm on Saturday morning, there is a full spread in the local newspaper detailing their experience at the Fair word-by-word, with extra emphasis on Margy, secretly written by Pat. Dave Miller returns, Abel pleads for him to cough up the money, but Dave reminds Abel that the bet was not about victory, but happiness. He emphasizes to Abel that he won't pay up until he is certain that everyone enjoyed themselves at the fair. Wayne and Eleanor have become engaged. Margy, however, has come in moping, saying that she has outgrown the fair. Shockingly, Pat has arrived at the Frake house, apologizing to Margy about leaving early, he reveals that he has been hired for the job in Chicago and he wants Margy to come with him. He gets down on one knee and proposes, Margy accepts. Dave Miller begrudgingly hands a $5 bill to Abel, and the two men shake hands and walk inside the house together ("Finale Ultimo").

== Musical numbers ==
Act I

- "Overture" – Orchestra
- "Opening (Our State Fair)" – Abel, Melissa, and Wayne
- "It Might as Well Be Spring"* – Margy
- "Driving at Night/Our State Fair"* – Abel, Melissa, Wayne, Margy, and Company
- "That's for Me"* – Wayne
- "More Than Just a Friend"* – Abel, Hank, Lem, and Clay
- "Isn't It Kinda Fun?"* – Pat and Margy
- "You Never Had It So Good" (cut from Me and Juliet) – Emily and the Fairtones
- "It Might as Well Be Spring (Reprise)" – Margy
- "When I Go Out Walking With My Baby" (cut from Oklahoma!) – Abel and Melissa
- "So Far" (from Allegro) – Wayne and Emily
- "It's a Grand Night for Singing"* – Company

Act II

- "Entr'acte" – Orchestra
- "The Man I Used to Be" (from Pipe Dream) – Pat, Vivian, and Jeanne
- "All I Owe Ioway"* – Abel and Company
- "The Man I Used to Be (Reprise)" – Pat
- "Isn't It Kinda Fun? (Reprise)"* – Margy
- "That's the Way It Happens" (from Me and Juliet) – Emily and the Fairtones
- "Boys and Girls Like You and Me" (cut from Oklahoma! and included in some productions of Cinderella, though not the original) – Abel and Melissa
- "Next Time It Happens" (from Pipe Dream) – Margy
- "Finale Ultimo" – Company

Notes on the music

The six songs from the original 1945 film score were supplemented by others that were either featured in, or cut from, other Rodgers and Hammerstein shows. One, "More Than Just a Friend," was written by Rodgers for the 1962 film remake after Hammerstein's death. "Driving at Night" was created by co-director James Hammerstein and the production's orchestrator, Bruce Pomahac, with music from a song that had been cut from Allegro entitled "Two Short Years".

The starred songs (above) were in the original 1945 or 1962 films.

== Cast and characters ==
Character	The Muny	North Carolina	Broadway
Character	1969	1992	1996
Abel Frake	Ozzie Nelson	Lenny Wolpe	John Davidson
Melissa Frake	Harriet Nelson	Jan Pessano	Kathryn Crosby
Margy Frake	Carol Richards	Susan Egan	Andrea McArdle
Wayne Frake	Jerry Lanning	Lewis Cleale	Ben Wright
Emily Arden	Bonnie Schon	Lisa Akey	Donna McKechnie
Pat Gilbert	Ron Husmann	Michael Halpin	Scott Wise
Dave Miller	Jack Goode	Charles Goff	Charles Goff
Harry	Bill Story	Philip Lehl	Peter Benson
Eleanor	Martha Morris	Karen Lifshey	Susan Haefner
Lem		Tom Hafner	John Wilkerson
Clay		Ed Badrak	J. Lee Flynn
Hank Munson	Bill Pollard	Raymond Patterson	Newton R. Gilchrist
Charlie	Bob Lynn	Robert Loftin	Darrian C. Ford
Vivian			Tina Johnson
Jeanne			Leslie Bell

== Accolades ==
Year	Award	Category	Nominee	Result
1996	Tony Award	Best Original Score	Richard Rodgers and Oscar Hammerstein II	Nominated
1996	Tony Award	Best Featured Actor in a Musical	Scott Wise	Nominated
1996	Drama Desk Award	Outstanding Featured Actor in a Musical	Scott Wise	Nominated
1996	Drama Desk Award	Outstanding Featured Actor in a Musical	Ben Wright	Nominated
1996	Drama Desk Award	Outstanding Featured Actress in a Musical	Donna McKechnie	Nominated
