= Pittsburg, Iowa =

Pittsburg, Iowa refers to two places in the state of Iowa in the United States:

- Pittsburg, Montgomery County, Iowa
- Pittsburg, Van Buren County, Iowa
