= The Top of New York =

1922 film

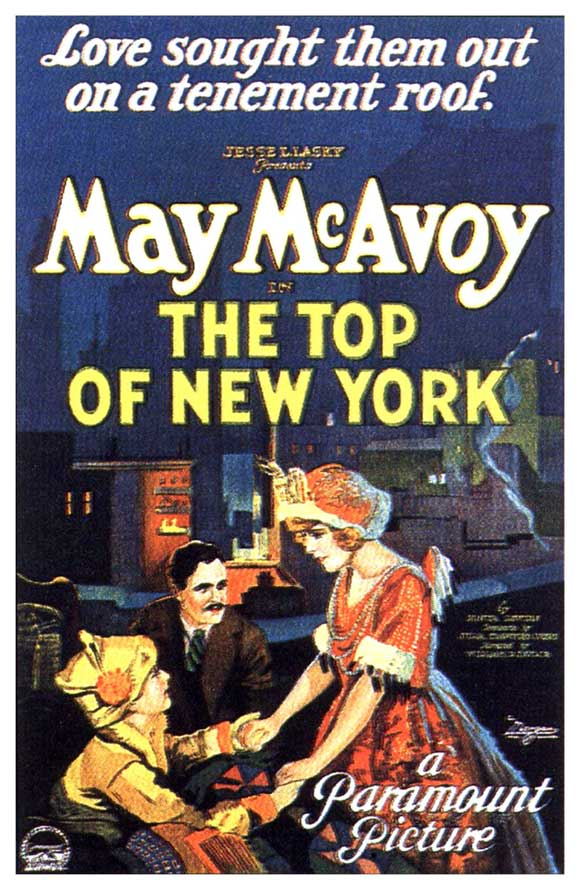
- Theatrical release poster
- Directed by: William Desmond Taylor
- Screenplay by: George James Hopkins; Julia Crawford Ivers; Sonya Levien
- Produced by: Jesse L. Lasky
- Starring: May McAvoy; Walter McGrail; Pat Moore; Edward Cecil; Charles Bennett; Mary Jane Irving
- Cinematography: James Van Trees
- Production company: Realart Pictures Corporation
- Distributed by: Paramount Pictures
- Release date: June 18, 1922
- Running time: 50 minutes
- Country: United States
- Language: Silent (English intertitles)

The Top of New York is a lost 1922 American silent drama film directed by William Desmond Taylor and written by George James Hopkins, Julia Crawford Ivers and Sonya Levien. The film stars May McAvoy, Walter McGrail, Pat Moore, Edward Cecil, Charles Bennett, and Mary Jane Irving. The film was released on June 18, 1922, by Paramount Pictures, four months after director Taylor's murder, and was the last one he completed.

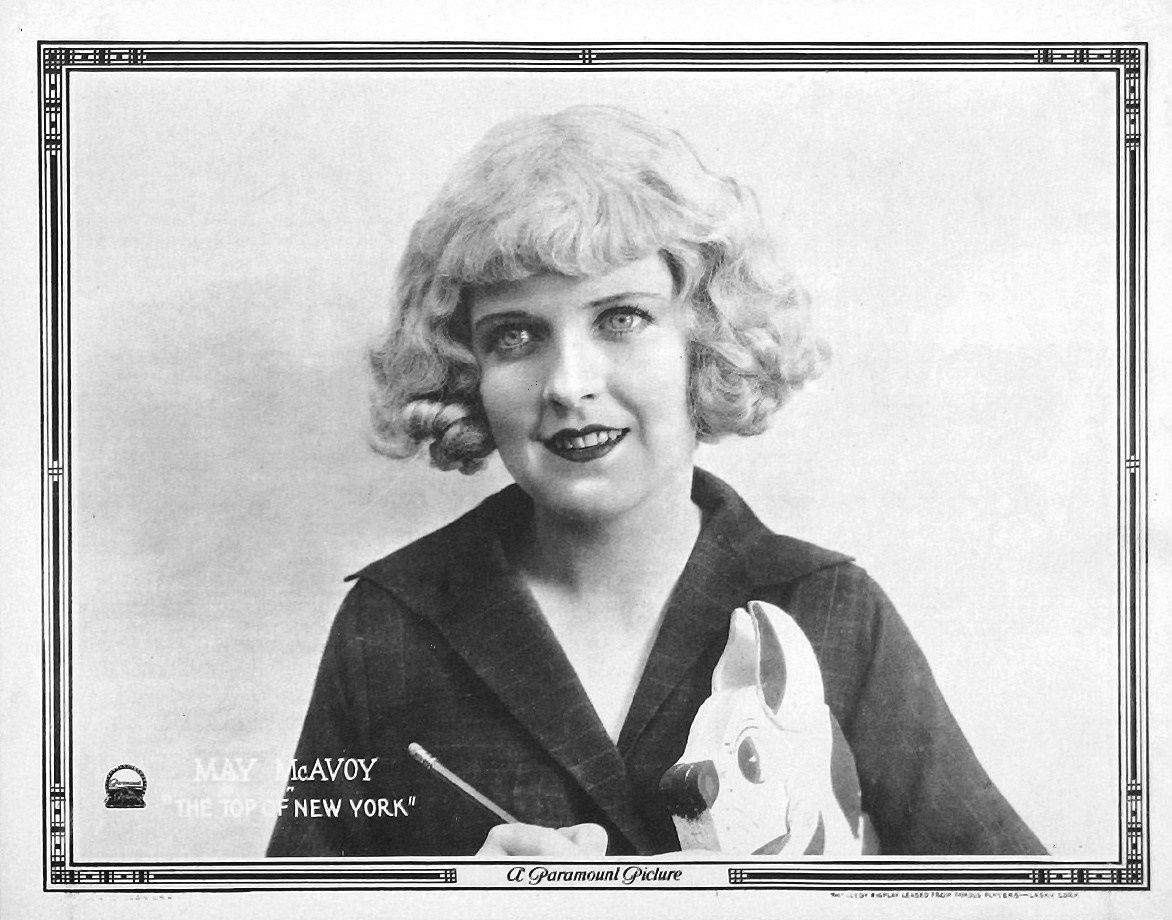
May McAvoy in The Top of New York

== Cast ==
- May McAvoy as Hilda O'Shaunnessey
- Walter McGrail as Emery Gray
- Pat Moore as Micky O'Shaunnessey
- Edward Cecil as Gregory Stearns
- Charles Bennett as Mr. Isaacson
- Mary Jane Irving as Susan Gray
- Carrie Clark Ward as Mrs. Brady
- Arthur Hoyt as Mr. Brady
