= Biwabik, Minnesota =

City in Minnesota, United States

- City
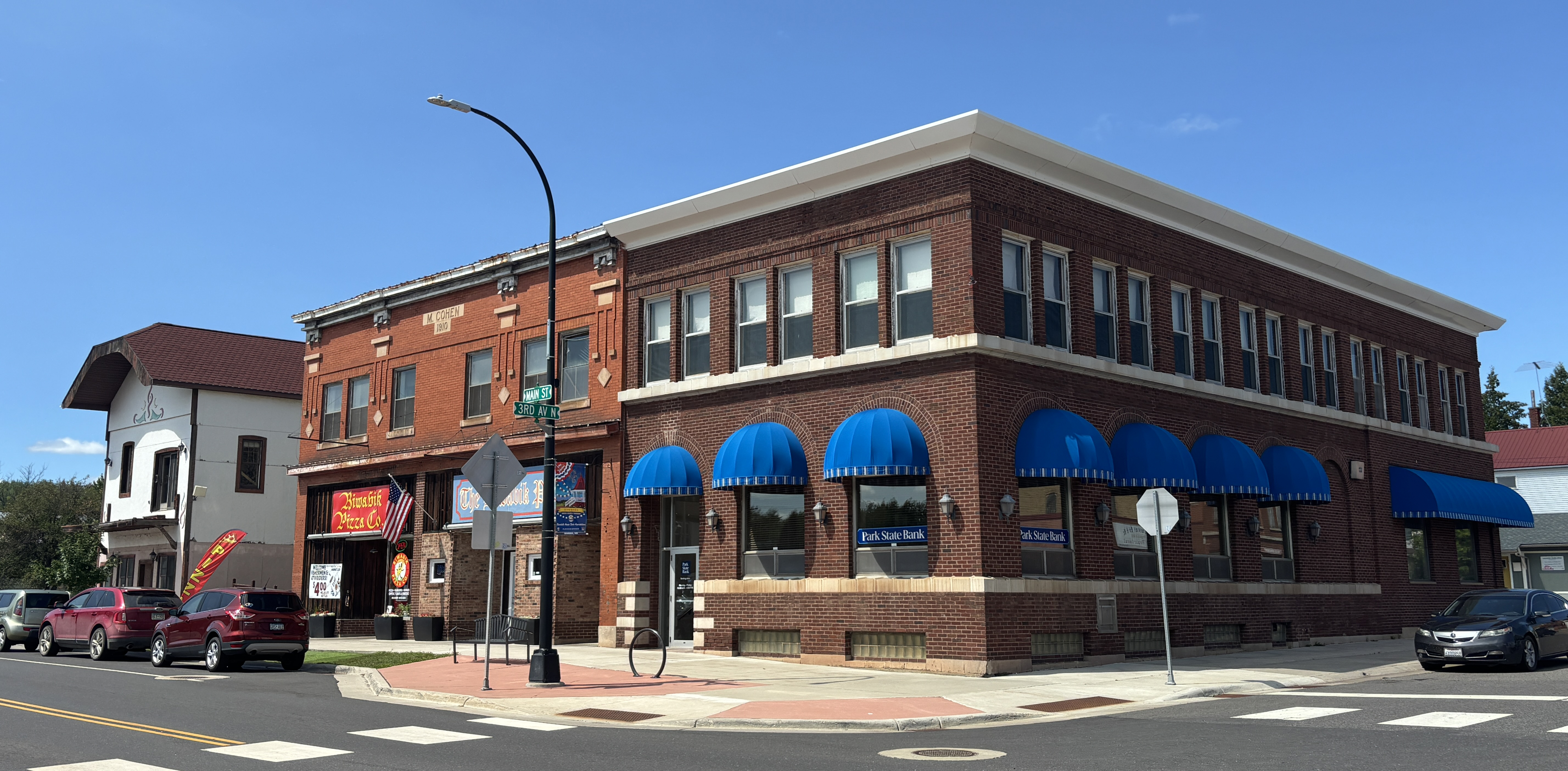
- Main Street at 3rd Avenue N

- Seal
- Motto: "The Home of Giants Ridge"
- Location of the city of Biwabik within Saint Louis County, Minnesota
- Coordinates: 47°32′0″N 92°20′32″W
- Country: United States
- State: Minnesota
- County: Saint Louis
- Incorporated: November 10, 1892

Government
  - Mayor: Jim Weikum

Area
  - Total: 9.93 sq mi (25.72 km^{2})
  - Land: 8.76 sq mi (22.69 km^{2})
  - Water: 1.17 sq mi (3.03 km^{2})
- Elevation: 1,450 ft (442 m)

Population (2020)
  - Total: 961
  - Estimate (2022): 963
  - Density: 109.7/sq mi (42.36/km^{2})
- Time zone: UTC-6 (Central (CST))
  - Summer (DST): UTC-5 (CDT)
- ZIP code: 55708
- Area code: 218
- FIPS code: 27-06148
- GNIS feature ID: 0660819
- Website: cityofbiwabik.com

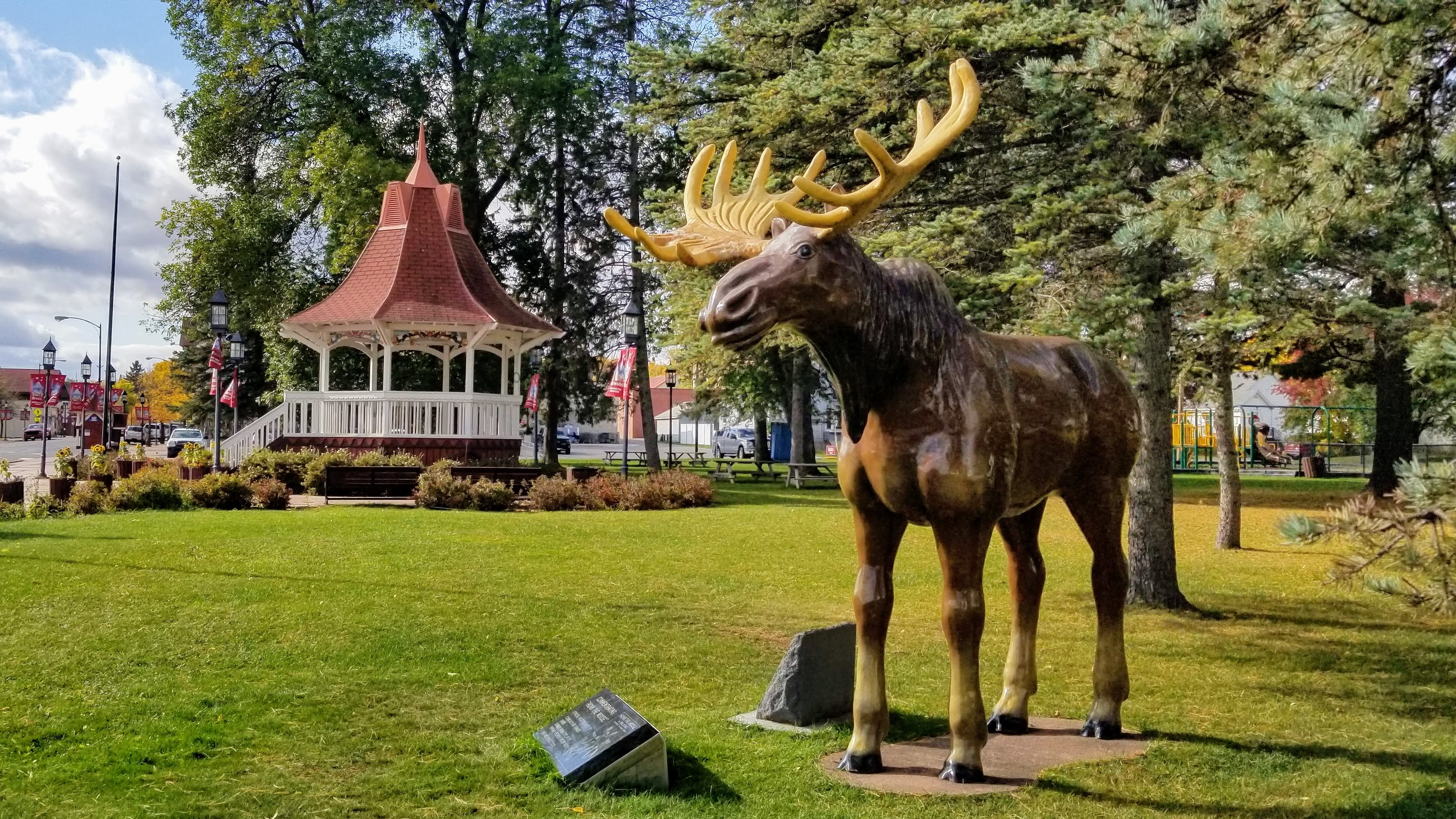
Biwabik town center with statue of Honk the Moose

Biwabik (/ˈbaɪwəbɪk/ BY-wə-bik) is a city in Saint Louis County, Minnesota, United States. The population was 961 at the 2020 census.

State Highway 135 (MN 135) and Vermilion Trail (County 4) are two of the main routes in Biwabik.

Its name is derived from the Ojibwe word for 'iron', biiwaabik. Biwabik is the gateway to the East Range on the Mesabi Iron Range.

Biwabik is a Bavarian-themed town that greets visitors to Giants Ridge Resort with two golf courses and a ski area, as well as trails, lakes, lodging and dining. The Mesabi Trail connects the community to Giants Ridge and Vermilion Trail Campground on Embarrass Lake, making the city a year-round destination. Events include the Calithumpian Fourth of July parade; Honktoberfest in September, an Oktoberfest which honors Honk the Moose; and Weihnachtsfest held on the first Saturday in December, with fireworks, music and food, and lights.

== Recreation ==
Biwabik is the home of Giants Ridge Golf and Ski Resort. Golf Digest ranked Giants Ridge as an "Editors Choice" in 2019 as one of "The Best Golf Resorts in the Midwest." Golf Digest has also ranked the Quarry the #1 public course in the state and #4 overall. The Legend has ranked as the #4 public course in the state and #14 overall.

The Giants Ridge Bike Park features 10 lift-served gravity (downhill) mountain bike trails featuring berms, jumps, rollers and rock gardens. The downhill trail system is designed for riders of all ability levels and embraces the scenic but rugged terrain of Giants Ridge. There are 9.2 mi (14.8 km) of purpose-built cross country mountain bike trail winding through the Superior National Forest.

Biwabik also hosts road cycling, mountain biking, golf, skiing, tubing, snowshoeing, boating, fishing, hunting, ATVing and snowmobiling. The Mesabi Trail and the East Range Multi Use Trail are in Biwabik, with several connection opportunities.

== Events ==
The Biwabik Area Civic Association hosts several events each year:

- Music in the park – Thursday nights in the summer
- City-wide rummage sale – spring and fall
- Honktoberfest – last weekend of September
- Weihnachtsfest – first weekend of December

Other events include:

- Pepsi Challenge ski race, which takes place at Giants Ridge in March.
- The Minnesota State High School League state alpine and nordic ski meets at Giants Ridge in February.

== Geography ==
According to the United States Census Bureau, the city has a total area of 10.15 square miles (26.29 km^{2}); 8.97 square miles (23.23 km^{2}) is land and 1.18 square miles (3.06 km^{2}) is water.

Unique to Biwabik is the Mary Ellen Jasper. The jasper variety was first discovered in Minnesota in the early 1900s. Mary Ellen Jasper contains 1.88-billion-year-old stromatolite fossils. It is fossilized algae, so the stromatolite is what makes the Mary Ellen unique.

== History ==
Daniel R. Curtin, Wisconsin State Assemblyman and businessman, at one time owned the town site of Biwabik, Minnesota. For 10 years, Curtin was in the lumber and mining business.

Biwabik is a town full of firsts. Biwabik was the first to incorporate as a village on the Iron Range in September 1892. It was also the first Iron Range town to be served by two railroads, the Duluth and Iron Range and the Duluth, Missabe and Northern Railway. Biwabik had the first large mine on the Mesabi and it was the first on the Iron Range with a steam shovel to mine.

An F3 tornado destroyed homes in the northern and northwestern parts of Biwabik on October 6, 1900, killing ten people in and near the city and injuring 70; six deaths were in one family.

In 1915, a moose visited the town regularly and in the book, Honk, the Moose, the residents named him "Honk" after the noise he made. This children's book Honk, the Moose, was written by famed author, Phil Stong and illustrated by Kurt Weise. Stong was a teacher and coach at the Biwabik school in the 1919–1920 school year. He featured people from Biwabik as characters. The book is a Newbery Honor and on Cattermole's 100 Best Children's Books of the 20th Century. A statue of Honk resides in the city park on Main Street.

Peter X. Fugina (1908–1994), educator and Minnesota state legislator was born in Biwabik.

== Demographics ==
Historical population
Census	Pop.	Note	%±
1900	1,299		—
1910	1,690		30.1%
1920	2,024		19.8%
1930	1,383		−31.7%
1940	1,304		−5.7%
1950	1,245		−4.5%
1960	1,836		47.5%
1970	1,483		−19.2%
1980	1,428		−3.7%
1990	1,097		−23.2%
2000	954		−13.0%
2010	969		1.6%
2020	961		−0.8%
2022 (est.)	963		0.2%
U.S. Decennial Census; 2020 Census

=== 2020 census ===
At the 2020 census, there were 961 people and 323 households in the city.

The racial makeup of the city was 887 White, 13 Native American, 1 Asian, 0 Pacific Islander, and 55 from two or more races. 19.4% German, 10.2% Irish, 9.4% Norwegian, 7% English, 6.5% Polish, 6.4% French, 5.5% Italian and .5% Scottish, according to the 2020 Census.

There were 323 households, of which 14.4% had children under the age of 18 living with them, 26.9% were married couples living together, 22.3% had a female householder with no husband present, 31% we male household, no spouse present. 21.4% had someone living alone who was 65 years of age or older. The average family size was 2.5.

14.4% of the population were under the age of 18, 85.6% from 18 and over, with 21.4 who were 65 years of age or older. The median age was 45.5 years.

The median household income was $41,719 and the median family income was $74,593. About 15.9% of people were below the poverty line, including 10.5% of those under age 18 and 4.7% of those age 65 or over.

== See also ==
- Honk, the Moose, a children's novel based on a story taking place in Biwabik. Written by Phil Stong, illustrated by Kurt Weise.

== Gallery ==
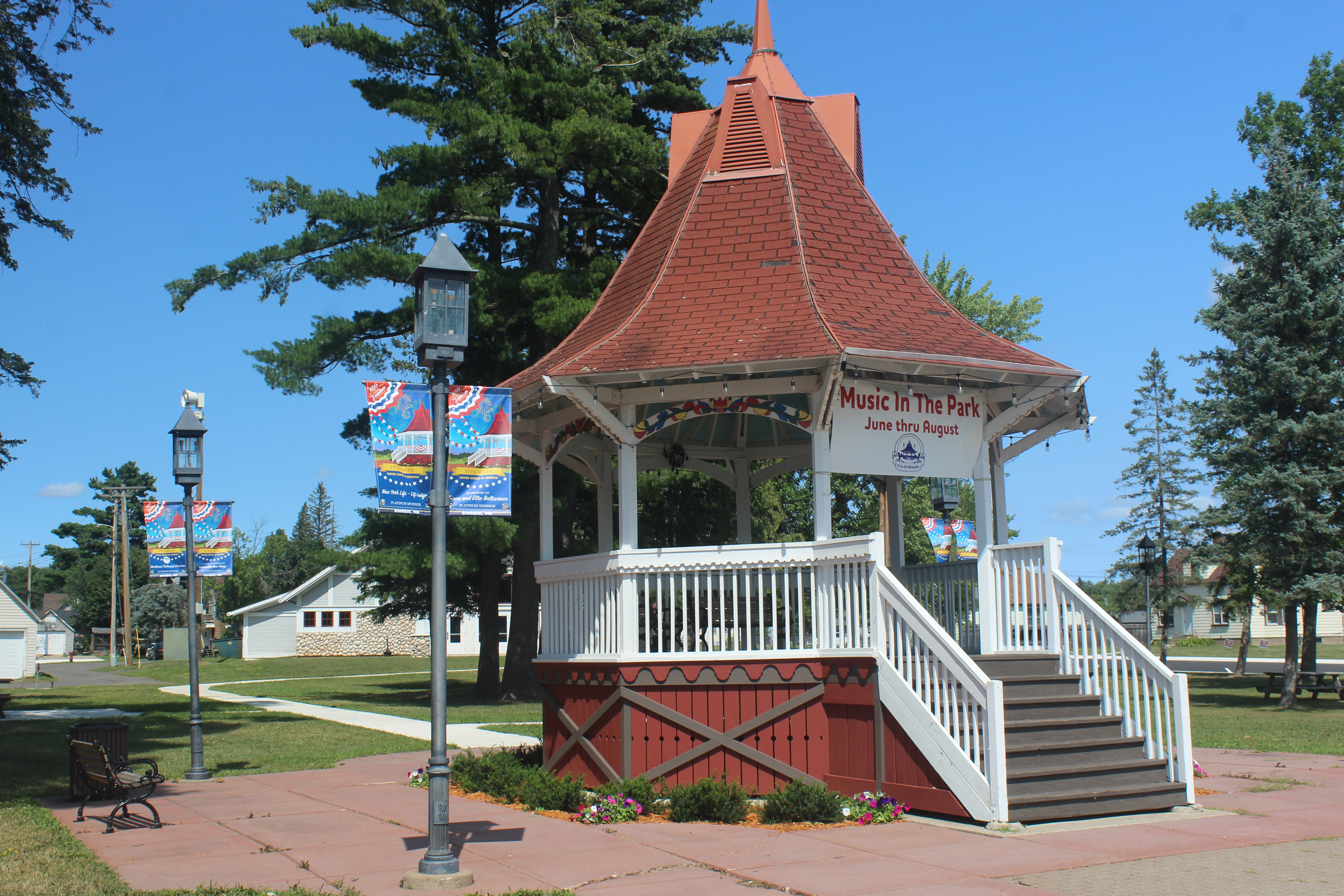
Park gazebo

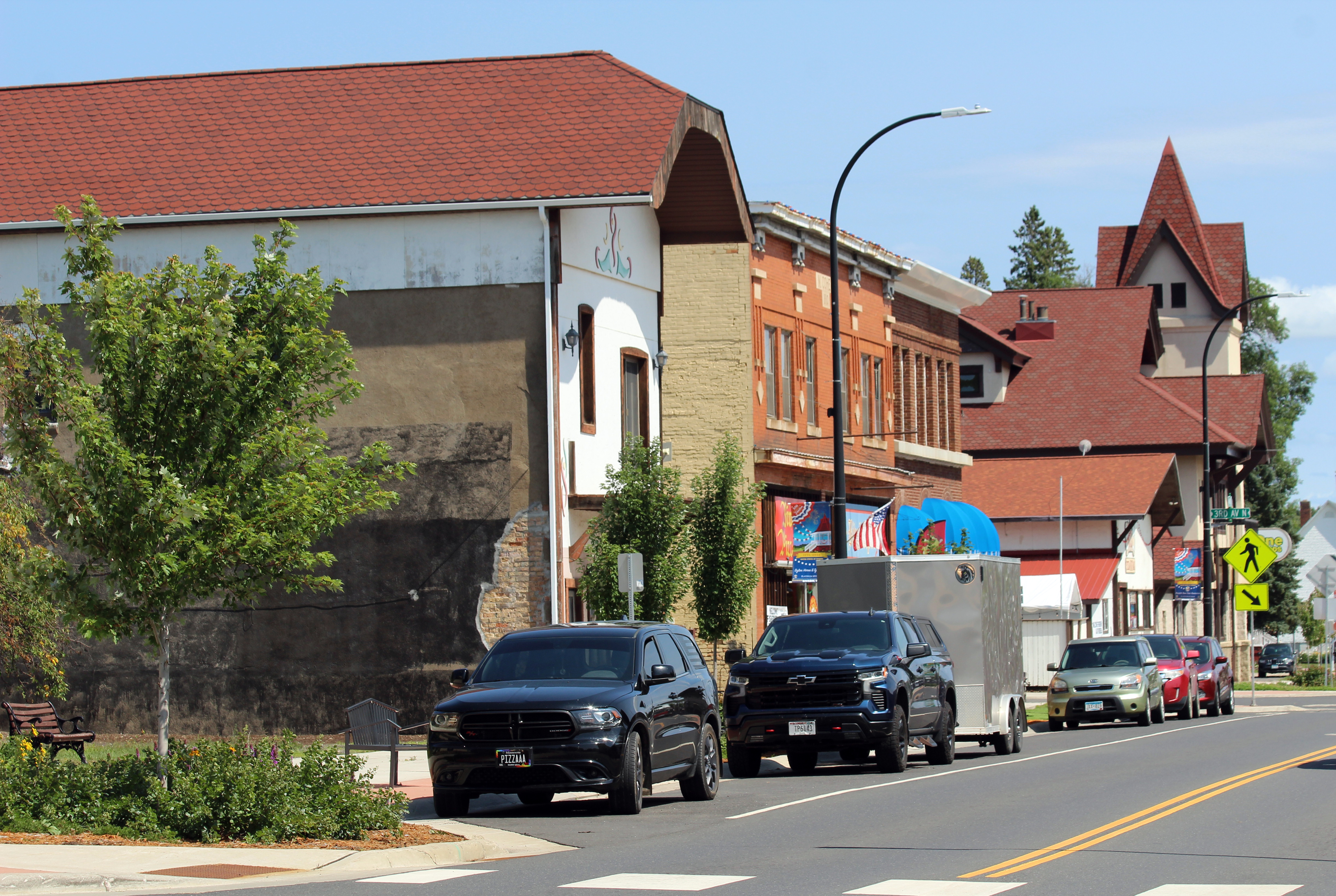
Main Street at 2nd Avenue N

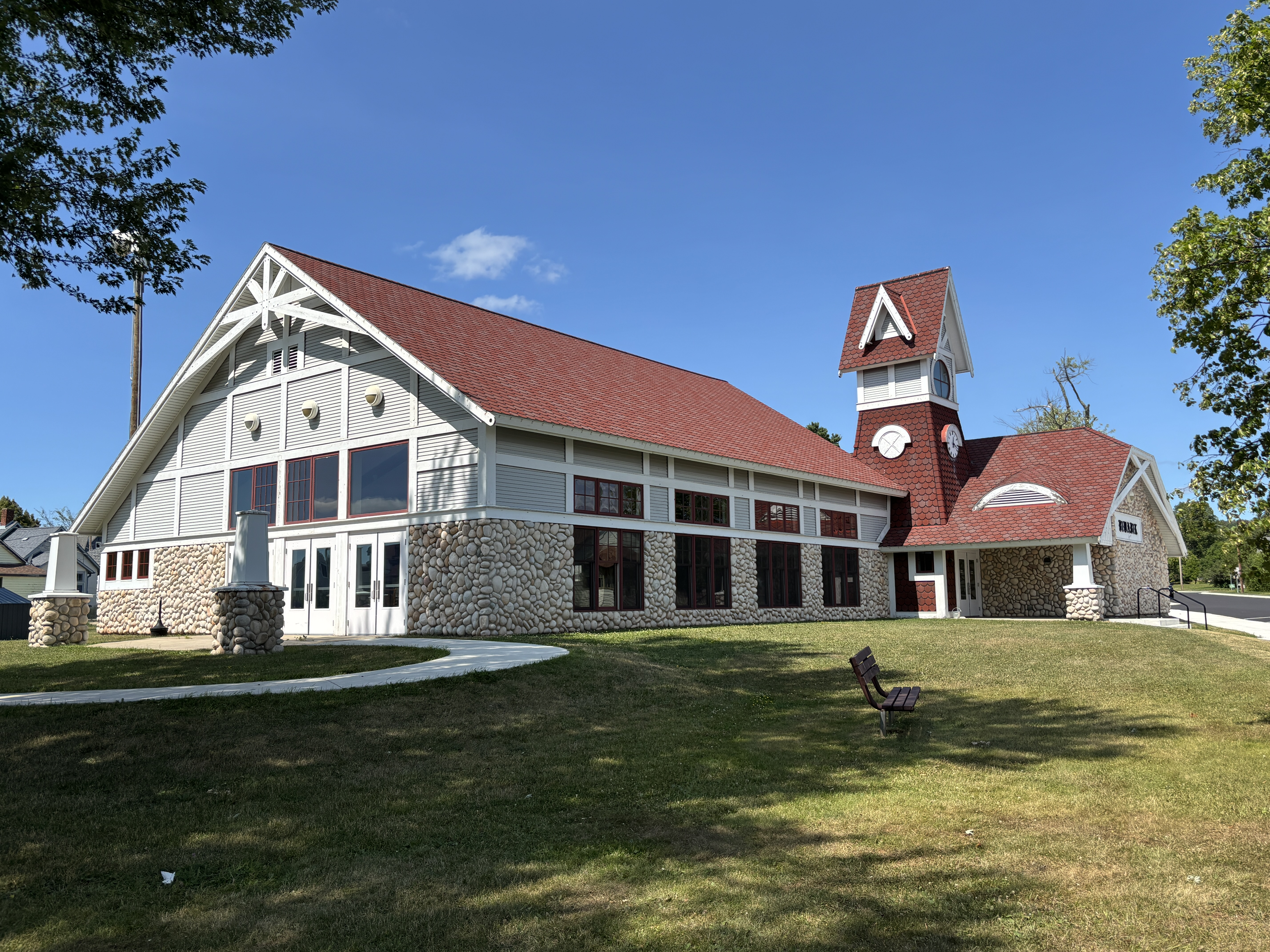
Park pavilion

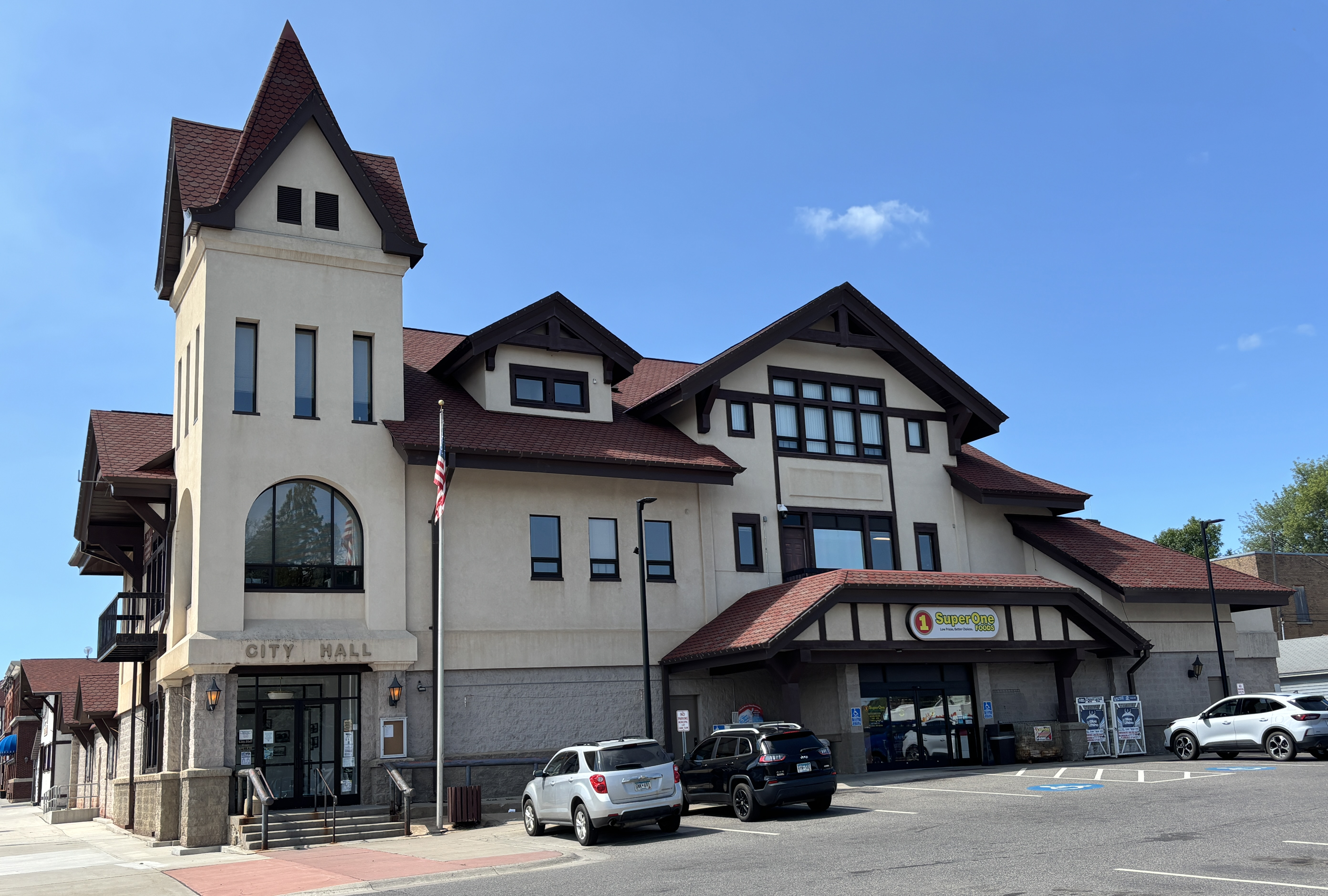
City Hall & grocery store

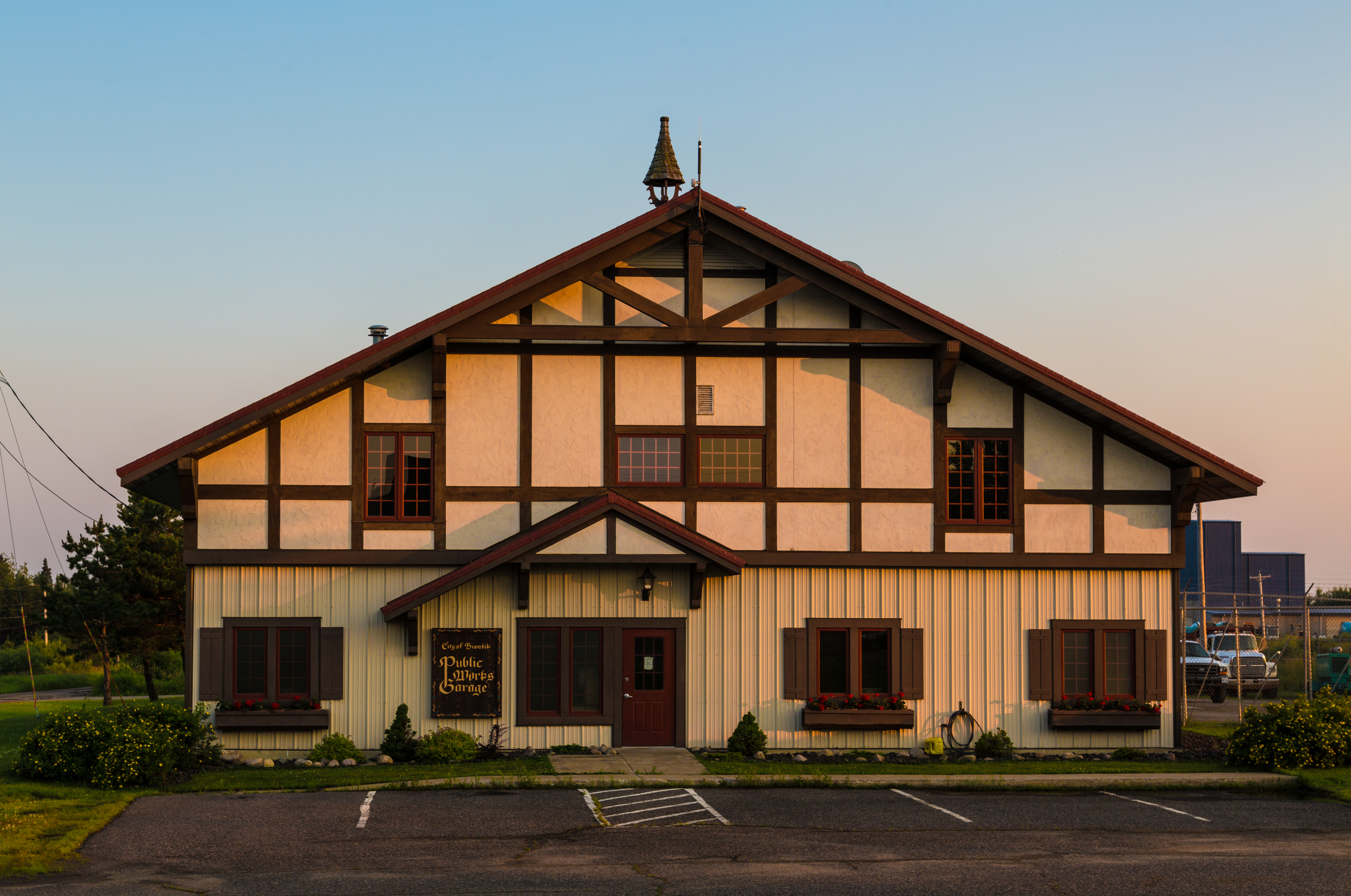
Public works garage

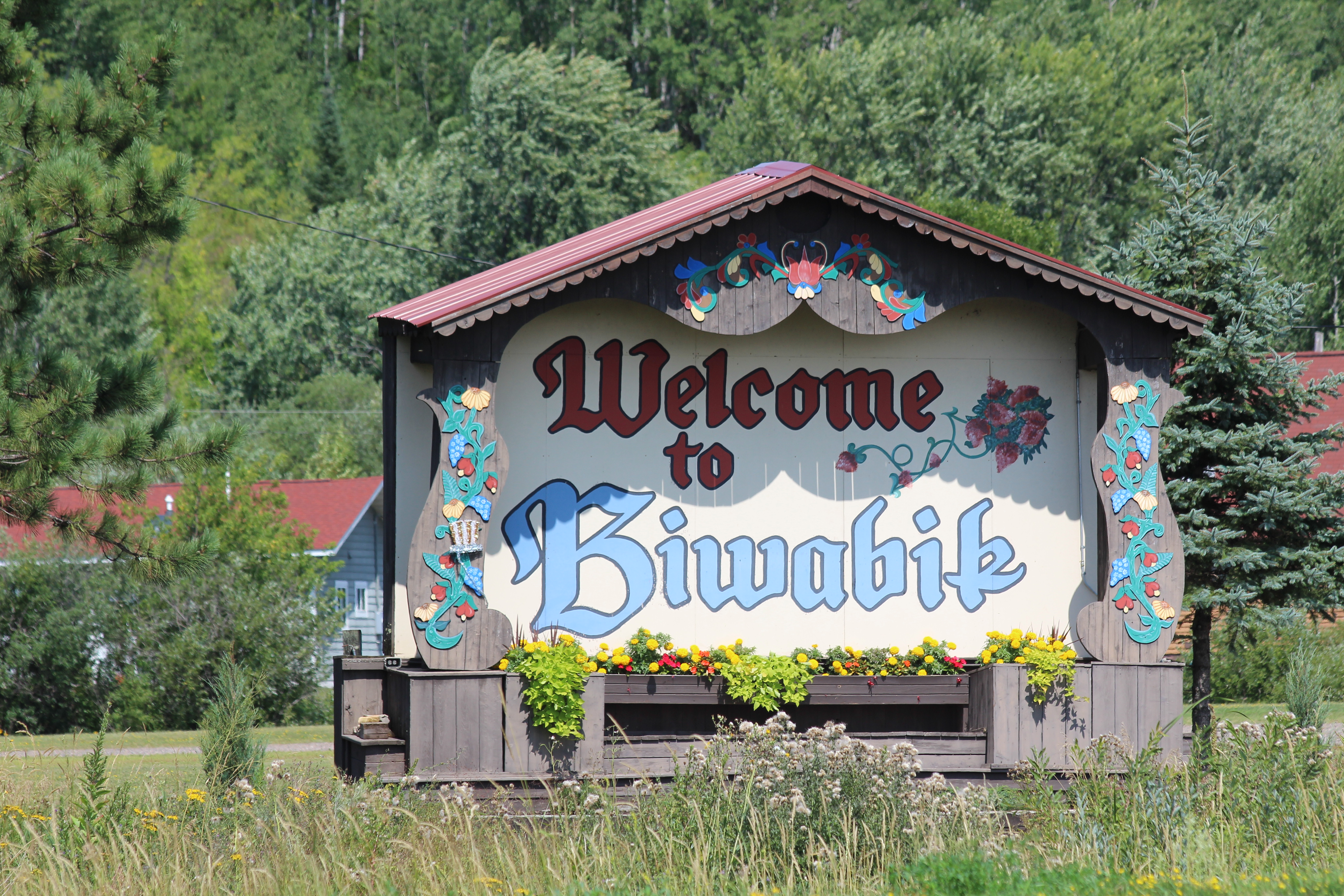
Welcome sign
