= It Might as Well Be Spring =

1945 popular song

Song
- Published: 1945 by Williamson Music
- Songwriter: Oscar Hammerstein II
- Composer: Richard Rodgers

"It Might as Well Be Spring" is a song from the 1945 film State Fair, which features the only original film score by the songwriting team of Richard Rodgers and Oscar Hammerstein II. "It Might as Well Be Spring" won the Academy Award for Best Original Song for that year.

== Composition/as a showtune ==
Ben Rimalower on It Might as Well Be Spring
A multitude of changes have been made to the various stage & screen incarnations of State Fair since its debut as an original Hollywood musical in 1945, but one element that won't ever be altered is the inclusion of the first-rate song "It Might As Well Be Spring." A true standard of the Great American Songbook, "It Might As Well be Spring" has been covered by countless singers drawn to its rich music & evocative lyrics, both of which manage to be simultaneously moody & soaring, coolly jazzy & unabashedly emotional.

The song is sung early in the film by Margy the teenage daughter of the State Fair-bound Frake family, who is feeling the symptoms of spring fever. Oscar Hammerstein, the lyricist for the Rodgers & Hammerstein team, mentioned to Richard Rodgers that although state fairs were held in summer or autumn, for Margy – flushed by the stirrings of womanhood – "it might as well be spring". Rodgers immediately advised Hammerstein that the latter had just named the song.

An early version of the composition exists with an alternate melody. Music historian Todd Purdum described the alternate version in 2018:

It is the only Rodgers and Hammerstein song for which a complete alternate melody, different from the final version, is known to exist. Rodgers’ initial take was a legato musical line, but as he pondered Hammerstein's words he thought better of his first idea, and instead substituted a syncopated melody that jumped from interval to interval, as if the notes themselves were puppets on strings."

Rodgers envisioned "It Might as Well Be Spring" as a cheery uptempo number, its being the decision of the musical director of State Fair, Alfred Newman, to present the song as a moody ballad. Rodgers canvassed the film studio to protest Newman's decision, but did ultimately admit it was the right choice.

In the 1945 film Jeanne Crain played Margy Frake, Margy's singing voice being dubbed by Louanne Hogan. In the 1962 remake of State Fair, in which Pamela Tiffin portrayed Margy, Anita Gordon provided the character's singing voice. Andrea McArdle as Margy performed "It Might as Well Be Spring" in the 1996 Broadway production of State Fair. Reviewing State Fair's pre-Broadway engagement at the Golden Gate Theater, Robert Hurwitt of the San Francisco Examiner deemed the "wondrous" song "It Might as Well be Spring" to be "as achingly wistful a romantic reverie as has ever been penned".

== Charting versions ==
- Dick Haymes, who played Margy's brother Wayne Frake in the 1945 film, made the first hit recording of the song, released by Decca Records as catalog number 18706. Debuting on the Billboard magazine Best Seller chart dated 8 November 1945, the disc had a chart tenure of 12 weeks with a peak of number 5. It was the flip side of "That's for Me" (also from State Fair), another top-10 best seller.
- The recording by Paul Weston/Margaret Whiting was released by Capitol Records as catalog number 214. It first reached the Billboard magazine Best Seller chart on November 22, 1945, and lasted six weeks on the chart, peaking at number 6.
- The recording by Sammy Kaye was released by RCA Victor Records as catalog number 20-1738. It first reached the Billboard magazine Best Seller chart on December 20, 1945 and lasted four weeks on the chart, peaking at number 8.
