= State Fair (1976 film) =

- Genre: Drama
- Based on: State Fair by Phil Stong
- Written by: Richard Fielder
- Directed by: David Lowell Rich
- Starring: Vera Miles; Tim O'Connor; Mitch Vogel; Julie Cobb; Jeff Cotler; Dennis Redfield; Linda Purl; Joel Stedman
- Music by: Lionel Newman; Laurence Rosenthal; Harriet Schock; Mitch Vogel
- Country of origin: United States
- Original language: English

Production
- Executive producers: M.J. Frankovich; William Self
- Producer: Robert L. Jacks
- Cinematography: Charles F. Wheeler
- Editor: Stanford Tischler
- Running time: 55 minutes
- Production company: 20th Century Fox Television

Original release
- Network: CBS
- Release: May 14, 1976

State Fair is a 1976 American made-for-television drama film loosely based on the 1932 novel of the same title by Phil Stong. It was broadcast on CBS on May 14, 1976, and starred Vera Miles as Melissa Bryant, the matriarch of the Bryant family.

It is the fourth film adaptation of the novel, the previous three having been released to theaters in 1933, 1945, and 1962. As in Stong's novel and previous film adaptations, the story involves an Iowa farm family who travel to the Iowa State Fair, where the son and daughter of the family, Wayne and Karen, each find romance. However, in the 1976 film, most of the character names were changed (the "Frakes" of the original novel became the "Bryants"), new son and grandson characters, Chuck and Tommy, were added, and other aspects of the story were changed and updated to reflect the 1970s.

The 1976 version was made as a pilot episode for a television series, but the series was never produced. It has been included as a special feature on the DVD release of the 1945 film.

== Plot ==
Melissa and Jim Bryant live on an Iowa farm with their adult son Chuck, their adult daughter Karen, and their teenage son Wayne, who is a high school sophomore. Wayne is a talented singer and guitarist who dreams of country music stardom. Karen, newly separated from her husband, has recently rejoined the family with her own young son Tommy, who misses his father.

The Bryants attend the Iowa State Fair, where Wayne enters the "Stars of Tomorrow" talent contest and falls in love with fellow competitor Bobbie Jean Shaw, who also aspires to a country music career in Nashville. Bobbie Jean, who may be using Wayne to further her own ambitions, pressures him to run away with her so they can pursue their musical dreams together. Meanwhile, Karen begins a new romance with her former classmate, David Clemmans, after they run into each other at the fair.

== Cast ==
- Vera Miles as Melissa Bryant
- Tim O'Connor as Jim Bryant
- Mitch Vogel as Wayne Bryant
- Julie Cobb as Karen Bryant Miller
- Jeff Cotler as Tommy Miller
- Dennis Redfield as Chuck Bryant
- Linda Purl as Bobbie Jean Shaw
- Joel Stedman as David Clemmans
