= Ben Wright (American actor) =

American actor and singer (born 1969)

- Born: September 3, 1969 (age 56)
- Years active: 1986-present
- Notable work: Into the Woods, Hot Mikado

Ben Wright (born September 3, 1969) is an American actor and singer, best known for originating the role of Jack in the Tony Award-winning musical Into the Woods.

Wright's professional acting career started with George C. Wolfe's Off-Broadway production of Paradise at Playwrights Horizons. He then went on to originate leading roles on Broadway in Stephen Sondheim's Into the Woods and the Tony nominated State Fair, for which he received a Drama Desk Nomination. He also originated the role of Nanki Poo in Hot Mikado at the Ford's Theater in Washington, D.C.

He has worked extensively with some of Broadway’s greatest talents, including Stephen Sondheim, James Lapine, Bernadette Peters, James Hammerstein, Paul Gemignani and Joanna Gleason. Wright's feature film credits include the Academy Award winning Born on the Fourth of July with Tom Cruise as well as Penny Marshall's Renaissance Man with Danny DeVito.

Wright's television credits include starring opposite Judd Nelson in NBC's Hiroshima: Out of the Ashes and the ABC drama series Capital News with Lloyd Bridges and Helen Slater. Wright has performed at the Tony Awards two times and can be heard on several albums, including the original cast recording of State Fair and the Grammy Award-winning recording of Into the Woods.

After his retirement from acting in 2003, Wright went on to become a financial advisor, working first with Citigroup then moving to Morgan Stanley before moving on to found his own firm Dye Creek Capitol in 2013. He left Dye Creek in 2020 to found the cafe restaurant chain Bitty and Beau's Coffee, a business focused on employing persons with disabilities, in Wilmington, North Carolina.
