= Anita Gordon =

American singer

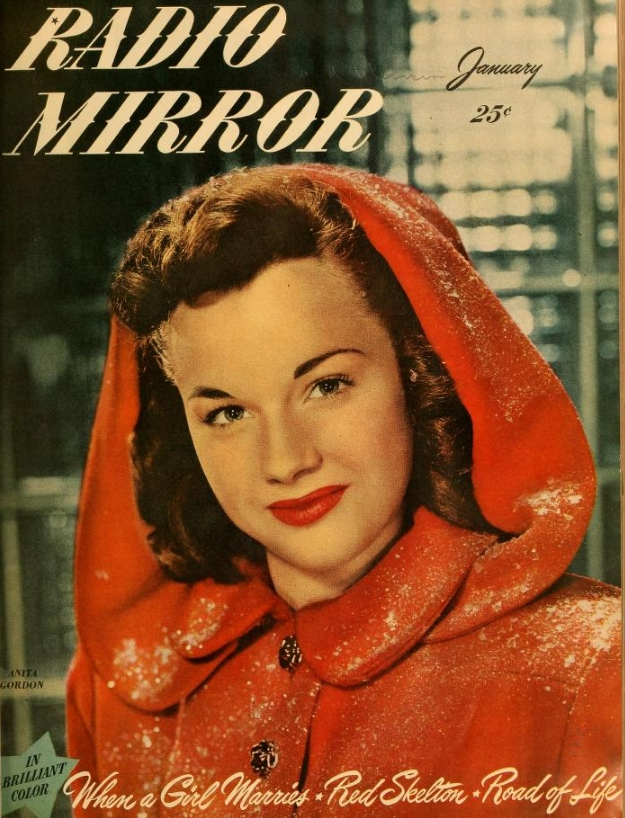
- Gordon on the cover of the January 1948 issue of Radio Mirror
- Born: December 21, 1929; Corsicana, TX
- Died: May 10, 2015 (aged 85); Newhall, California
- Occupations: Singer actress
- Spouses: Dale Sheets (m. 1948; div. 1965); El Chan (m. 1974)
- Children: 3

Anita Gordon (December 21, 1929 - May 10, 2015) was an American singer who performed on radio and television and sang on films and records.

== Early years ==
Gordon was the daughter of Mr. and Mrs. Pete Gordon of Corsicana, Texas. Her father was a butcher, and her mother was a housewife. They were choir director and organist, respectively, at their church in Corsicana. By age 6, Gordon's family had moved to Hollywood in October 1935, where she had a role in The Pilgrimage Play. She had a sister, Charlie Marie, and her uncle, Leonard Gordon, was a vocal coach in Hollywood. Gordon's secondary education came at Mrs. Laskey's School for Professionals.

== Career ==
In 1945, Gordon signed a film contract with 20th Century Fox, a radio contract with Edgar Bergen, and a recording contract with Columbia. Gordon performed off-camera for films, including voicing the "I don't talk to strangers" on the Buddy Clark hit "Linda" (1946), singing the part of the Golden Harp in Fun and Fancy Free (1947) and dubbing the singing voices of Pamela Tiffin in State Fair (1962) and Jean Seberg in Paint Your Wagon (1969).

On radio, Gordon was a vocalist on The Chase and Sanborn Hour. Her work on television in Los Angeles included singing, along with Bob Graham, on Starlight Time, on KNBH in 1949, frequently performing on KTTV's Hollywood Studio Party, and singing on Bandstand Revue on KTLA-TV. Network TV programs on which Gordon appeared included Death Valley Days, Gunsmoke, The Millionaire, Sugarfoot, The Bob Newhart Show and The Tennessee Ernie Ford Show. In 1951, Ken Murray signed her to share singing duties with Patti Page on his New York-based TV show.

Gordon sang with Ray Noble's orchestra on a Columbia recording of "It's a Most Unusual Day", and she was heard (uncredited) on Buddy Clark's recordings of "I'll Dance At Your Wedding" and "Linda". In 1955, Gordon recorded "His Hands" for Decca Records. In 1953, she made personal appearances with Noble's orchestra, singing with Larry Neill on a tour that included two weeks in Houston and four weeks in New Orleans.

In 1954, Gordon starred in ' Round Up of Rhythm ', a film short in which she, and Disc Jockey Bill Delzell, played the Bill Haley and the Comets's records ' Straight Jacket ' and 'Shake Rattle and Roll', which the group are seen playing.

== Personal life ==
In June 1948, Gordon married CBS executive Dale Sheets, and they had three daughters. In the 1970s, she married El Chan, an airline executive.

== Death ==
On May 10, 2015, Gordon died at her Newhall, California, home at age 85 after several years of declining health.
