= Jeanne Eagels (film) =

1957 film by George Sidney

- Theatrical release poster
- Directed by: George Sidney
- Screenplay by: Daniel Fuchs; Sonya Levien; John Fante
- Story by: Daniel Fuchs
- Produced by: George Sidney
- Starring: Kim Novak; Jeff Chandler
- Cinematography: Robert H. Planck
- Edited by: Viola Lawrence; Jerome Thoms
- Music by: George Duning
- Color process: Black and white
- Production company: Columbia Pictures
- Distributed by: Columbia Pictures
- Release date: August 2, 1957
- Running time: 109 minutes
- Country: United States
- Language: English
- Box office: $3.1 million (US rentals)

Jeanne Eagels (also titled The Jeanne Eagels Story) is a 1957 American biographical film loosely based on the life of stage star Jeanne Eagels. Distributed by Columbia Pictures, the film was produced and directed by George Sidney from a screenplay by John Fante, Daniel Fuchs and Sonya Levien, based on a story by Fuchs.

The film stars Kim Novak in the title role and Jeff Chandler.

Many aspects of Eagels' real life were omitted or largely fictionalized. Eagels' family later sued Columbia Pictures over the way Eagels was depicted in the film.

== Plot ==
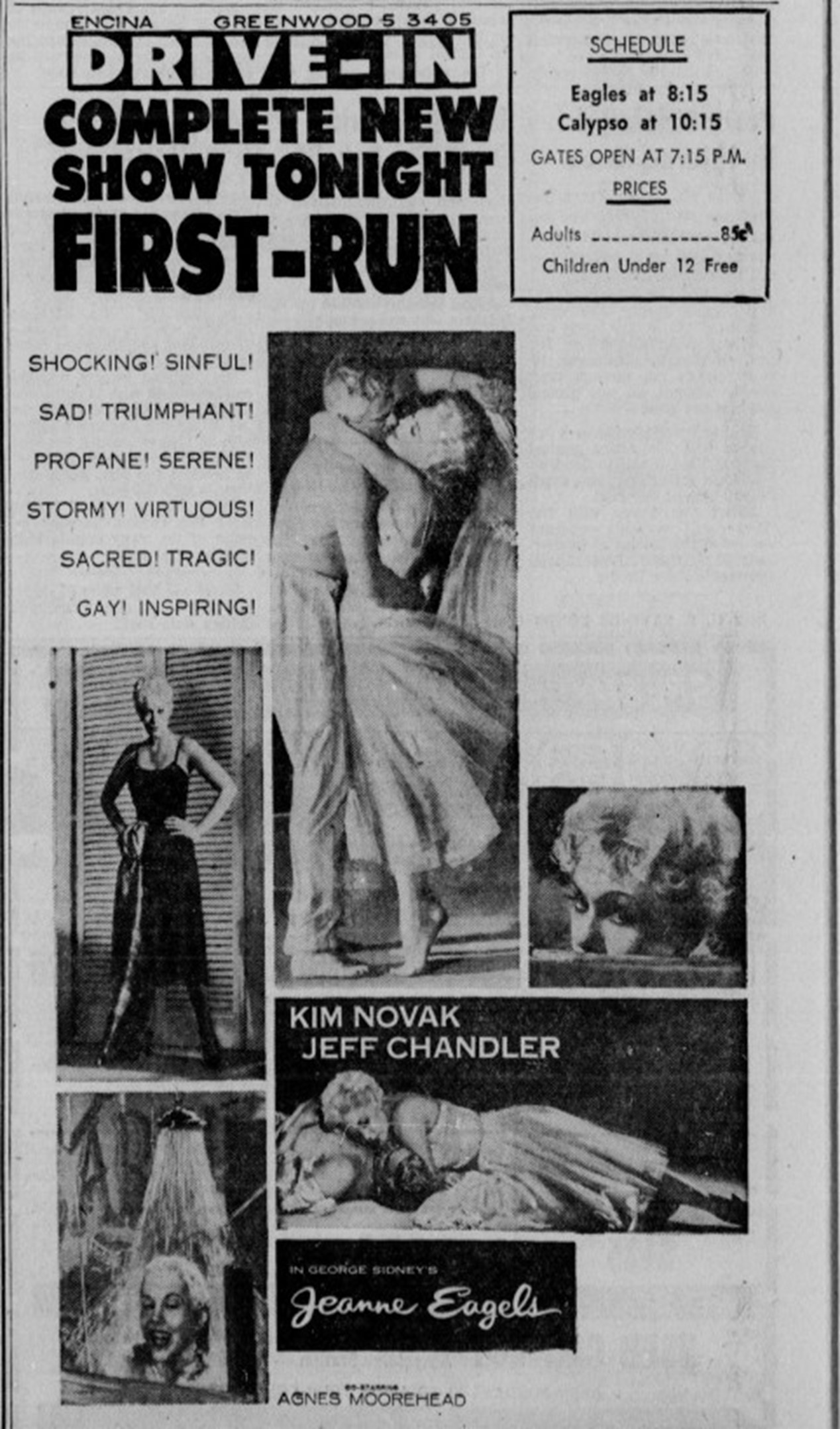
Drive-in advertisement from 1957

Jeanne Eagels is a Kansas City waitress. After losing a beauty contest, she asks carnival owner Sal Satori for a job. Her dance in a skimpy costume is called obscene. Sal joins his brother in New York and invites Jeanne to join them at an amusement park on Coney Island.

Taking acting lessons instead, the ambitious Jeanne becomes the understudy in a Broadway show and a star when she gets a chance to play the part. A former successful actress named Elsie Desmond wants to make a comeback in a new play, but Jeanne betrays her and takes the play for herself, willing to do anything to advance. Elsie denounces her in the theater before the first performance and then commits suicide. Sal is also disgusted by Jeanne's behavior. She accepts a proposal from a lowlife named John Donahue, but both descend into alcoholism. Jeanne misses performances and causes fellow actors to lose paychecks.

Jeanne's situation deteriorates further when she must pay alimony to John after a divorce. A new play fails because Jeanne, drunk and on pills, collapses on stage. The actors' guild suspends her for 18 months. Unable to work, she returns to Sal's amusement park and is offered a job dancing. Another performer sexually assaults her in a dressing room. Jeanne, her life in ruins, continues to spiral downward and hallucinate. While trying to take the stage one night, she collapses on a staircase and dies.

== Cast ==
- Kim Novak as Jeanne Eagels
- Jeff Chandler as Sal Satori
- Agnes Moorehead as Nellie Neilson
- Charles Drake as John Donahue
- Larry Gates as Al Brooks
- Virginia Grey as Elsie Desmond
- Gene Lockhart as Equity Board President
- Joe De Santis as Frank Satori (as Joe de Santis)
- Murray Hamilton as Chick O'Hara

== Production ==
The film was long planned as a vehicle for Kim Novak. Jeff Chandler had just finished a long-term exclusive contract with Universal and played the male lead.

Novak's dress caught fire during filming but Chandler extinguished it.

== Reception ==
Variety called it "unexciting" and let down by its performances.

== Soundtrack ==
- "Half of My Heart", written George W. Duning, Ned Washington 1957, recorded by Jeff Chandler 1958,
- Love Theme from "Jeanne Eagels (film)" by Morris Stoloff and His Orchestra 1958, single by The Four Aces 1957

== Home media ==
Sony Pictures Home Entertainment released Jeanne Eagels on August 3, 2010, as part of its Kim Novak Collection. The box set also includes the films Picnic (1956), Bell, Book and Candle (1958), Middle of the Night (1959) and Pal Joey (1957).

== See also ==
- List of American films of 1957
