= The Other Worlds =

1941 anthology edited by Phil Stong

- Dust-jacket from the first edition
- Author: Phil Stong, ed.
- Language: English
- Genre: Science fiction Fantasy; Horror
- Publisher: Wilfred Funk
- Publication date: 1941
- Publication place: United States
- Media type: Print (Hardback)
- Pages: 466 pp

The Other Worlds is an anthology of science fiction, fantasy, and horror edited by Phil Stong. It was originally published by Wilfred Funk in 1941, with a lower-price edition following from Garden City Publishing a year later. The Encyclopedia of Science Fiction describes it as "the first important sf Anthology".; it remains in the collection of nearly 200 academic libraries in 2015.

== Contents ==
- "The Considerate Hosts", Thorp McClusky (Weird Tales 1939)
- "The Man in the Black Hat", Michael Fessier (Esquire 1934)
- "Naked Lady", Mindret Lord (Weird Tales 1934)
- "The House of Ecstasy", Ralph Milne Farley (Weird Tales 1938)
- "Escape", Paul Ernst (Weird Tales 1938)
- "The Adaptive Ultimate", Stanley G. Weinbaum (Astounding 1935)
- "The Woman in Gray", Walker G. Everett (Weird Tales 1935)
- "The Pipes of Pan", Lester del Rey (Unknown 1940)
- "Aunt Cassie", Virginia Swain (first publication)
- "A God in a Garden", Theodore Sturgeon (Unknown 1939)
- "The Man Who Knew All the Answers", Donald Bern (Amazing 1940)
- "Adam Link’s Vengeance", Eando Binder (Amazing 1940)
- "Truth Is a Plague", D. W. O’Brien (Amazing 1940)
- "The Fourth-Dimensional Demonstrator", Murray Leinster (Astounding 1935)
- "Alas, All Thinking!", Harry Bates (Astounding 1935)
- "The Comedy of Eras", Henry Kuttner (Thrilling Wonder Stories 1940)
- "A Problem for Biographers", Mindret Lord (first publication)
- "In the Vault", H. P. Lovecraft (Weird Tales 1932)
- "School for the Unspeakable", Manly Wade Wellman (Weird Tales 1937)
- "The House Where Time Stood Still", Seabury Quinn Weird Tales 1939)
- "The Mystery of the Last Guest", John Flanders (Weird Tales 1935)
- "The Song of the Slaves", Manly Wade Wellman (Weird Tales 1940)
- "The Panelled Room", August Derleth (Westminster Magazine 1933)
- "The Graveyard Rats", Henry Kuttner (Weird Tales 1936)
- "The Return of Andrew Bentley", August Derleth and Mark Schorer (Weird Tales 1933)

=== Notes ===
"The Comedy of Eras" originally appeared under the Kelvin Kent byline. "The Adaptive Ultimate" originally appeared under the byline "John Jessel". "John Flanders" is a pen name for the author more wifely known by his other pseudonym of Jean Ray.

== Reception ==
Kirkus Reviews described The Other Worlds as "[e]ntertainment from sources usually high-hatted by the literati," and noting that " The best of them are well written, with good plots and ideas; the rest smack of their [pulp] sources." Unknown Worlds's pseudonymous reviewer recommended the anthology as "a lot of book for the money", noting that "it contains a number of good, forceful, entertaining stories. A reviewer for Thrilling Wonder Stories praised the book, saying "the average tale in this volume is of a very high order" while noting its editor's aversion to "interplanetary yarns". A reviewer in Future Science Fiction received the anthology quite unfavorably, calling it an "opus malodorous" and complaining that "most of the selections are weird stories of varying mediocrity."

Critic Brian Stableford noted that Stong had compiled "the first anthology of fantastic fiction to feature a significant sample of stories from the sf magazines" and that the editor has "deliberately excluded 'interplanetary fiction' from the showcase and included an editorial railing against the imbecility and intrinsic worthlessness of fiction of that sort."
