= Honk, the Moose =

Children's book by Phil Stong

Honk the Moose
- Author: Phil Stong
- Illustrator: Kurt Wiese
- Language: English
- Genre: Children's literature
- Publisher: Dodd, Mead & Co.
- Publication date: 1935
- Publication place: United States

Honk the Moose is a 1935 children's book written by Phil Stong and illustrated by Kurt Wiese. Based on a true story from the Finnish-settled Biwabik, Minnesota, it tells the story of a moose who wanders into a small town, causing an uproar when three young boys try to save the moose so it can survive the Minnesota winter. The book was a Newbery Honor recipient in 1936 and in 1970 it won a Lewis Carroll Shelf Award
