= Giants Ridge =

Ski area in Minnesota, United States

Coordinates: 47.575714°N 92.303298°W

- Interactive map of Giants Ridge
- Nearest city: Biwabik, Minnesota
- Vertical: 500 ft (152 m)
- Top elevation: 1,972 feet (601 m)
- Base elevation: 1,472 feet (449 m)
- Skiable area: 202 acres (82 ha)
- Trails: 35 total: 30% beginner; 50% intermediate; 20% advanced
- Longest run: 0.8 miles (1.3 km)
- Lift system: 7 chairlifts 2 surface lifts
- Terrain parks: 2
- Snowmaking: Yes
- Night skiing: Yes
- Website: Giants Ridge

Giants Ridge is a ski area, which hosts a collection of ski and snowboard trails, located along Wynne Lake in the middle of St. Louis County, east of Biwabik, Minnesota in the United States.

== History ==
In 1959, the main hill was cut consisting of one complete run on the west side of the road and a single-line rope tow. The chalet was a structure purchased from Erie Mining Co. This building was converted from the Evergreen Trailer Court into a warm-up building. After being closed for several years in the late 1970s and early 1980s, the IRRRB purchased the property from the bank, which satisfied an earlier federal Small Business Administration loan. In 1984, the IRRRB provided an original financial commitment of $6 million to $7 million to create a Nordic training facility and an alpine skiing complex.

== Location ==
Giants Ridge is located in Minnesota's Iron Range, in St. Louis County, east of Biwabik, Minnesota in the United States.

== Ski runs and terrain ==
There are 202 acres (0.82 km^{2}) skiable at Giants Ridge. The ski hill has 500 feet (150 m) of vertical drop. Giants Ridge often uses artificial snow for maintaining the slopes. There are 35 trails with 7 chairlifts. There are two chalets, the Burnt Onion Chalet and the South Chalet. There is also a yurt, restaurant, grill, and a hotel. During the summer, Giants Ridge operates two golf courses, the 18 hole Legends course, and the 18 hole Quarry course.

== Activities ==
The following are activities included at Giants Ridge:

- Alpine skiing
- Night skiing
- Snowboarding
- Nordic skiing
- Snow tubing
- Snowshoeing
- Fat tire biking
- Adaptive skiing
- Golf
- Mountain biking
