= Phil Stong =

American author, journalist and Hollywood scenarist

Philip Duffield Stong (January 27, 1899 – April 26, 1957) was an American author, journalist and Hollywood scenarist. He is best known for the 1932 novel State Fair, which was adapted as a film in 1933, 1945, 1962 and 1976, and as a Broadway musical in 1996.

== Biography ==
Stong was born in Pittsburg, Iowa, near Keosauqua. His father operated the general store, which is now an antique store. The 1844 brick house where Stong was born is located adjacent to the store and is now a private residence. He attended Drake University in Des Moines, Iowa.

Stong scored his first success in 1932 with the publication of his famous novel, State Fair, which was first adapted for the screen in the 1933 film of the same name starring Will Rogers. It received an Oscar nomination for Best Picture. In 1945, Rodgers and Hammerstein adapted it into a film musical of the same name. Subsequent versions were made in 1962 and 1976. In 1996, it was made into a Broadway musical. His novel Career was adapted to the screen twice, in 1939, starring Anne Shirley and again in 1959, starring Dean Martin and Shirley MacLaine. His novel Stranger's Return was also made into a motion picture, starring Academy Award winning actor Lionel Barrymore.

In 1968, his book Way Down Cellar was made into a television film for Walt Disney's Wonderful World of Color. It starred Richard Bakalyan, Ben Wright, Butch Patrick, and Grace Lee Whitney.

About his writing career, he once said, "Fell while trying to clamber out of a low bathtub at the age of two. Became a writer. No other possible career."

In a poll carried out by the Saturday Review of Literature asking American writers which Presidential candidate they endorsed in the 1940 election, Stong stated that he had voted for Franklin D. Roosevelt in the 1936 election, but that he was now going to vote for Wendell Willkie.

Stong created a 466-page anthology published by Wilfred Funk in 1941, The Other Worlds, later issued with the descriptive subtitle 25 Modern Stories of Mystery and Imagination. It was considered by Robert Silverberg (in the foreword to Best of the Best: 20 Years of the Year's Best Science Fiction) to be the first anthology of science-fiction. Compiling stories from 1930s pulp magazines, along with what Stong called "Scientifiction" (a term created by magazine publisher and editor Hugo Gernsback), it also contained works of horror and fantasy. The Encyclopedia of Science Fiction describes it as "about half sf and half horror" and observes that for science fiction the pulp magazines were a new source of material for hardcover reissue.

In his essay How to Name a Dog, James Thurber reports that he met Stong's spaniel and learned, to its owner's embarrassment, that the dog's name was Thurber. He suggests, by way of revenge, that the reader name his dog Stong.

Asked in 1951 to comment on humanism, Stong responded: "I’ve never gone deeply enough into any of the various definitions of “humanism" to be able to make any intelligent or instructive comment on the subject. When I read any of these tenuous expositions, they remind me (a) of the blind men and the elephant and (b) that I'd better have a glass of beer and get to bed. I don't see how you distinguish between the humanism of More and that of Dewey or of Aristophanes or Lackland or Chaucer or Bunyan or Saintsbury or Taine. The boys that practice it seem to me tremendously more effective than the ones who preach it from the varied pulpits."

Stong published more than forty books. He died of a heart attack at his home in Washington, Connecticut, on April 26, 1957. He is buried at Oak Lawn Cemetery in Keosauqua.

== Books ==
=== Adult ===
- Adventures of "Horse" Barnsby (1956)
- Blizzard (1955)
- Buckskin Breeches (1937)
- Career (1936)
- Farmer in the Dell (1935)
- Gold in Them Hills (1957)
- Hiram, the Hillbilly (1951)
- Horses and Americans (1939)
- The Iron Mountain (1942)
- Ivanhoe Keeler (1939)
- Jessamy John (1947)
- The Long Lane (1939)
- Mississippi Pilot (1954)
- One Destiny (1941)
- The Princess (1941)
- The Rebellion of Lennie Barlow (1937)
- Return in August (1953)
- State Fair (1932)
- The Stranger's Return (1933)
- Village Tale (1934)
- Week-end (1935)
- Marta of Muscovy (1945)

=== Edited by ===
- The Other Worlds: 25 Modern Stories of Mystery and Imagination (Wilfred Funk, 1941); (Garden City Publishing, 1942)

=== Juvenile ===
- Honk, the Moose (1935; Newbery Medal Honor Book)
- Farm Boy: A Hunt for Indian Treasure (1934)
- Phil Stong's Big Book: Farm Boy; High Water; No-Sitch, The Hound (1937)
- Young Settler
- The Hired Man's Elephant (1939)
- Captain Kidd's Cow (1941)
- Way Down Cellar (1942)
- Censored, the Goat (1945)

State Fair and Marta of Muscovy were published as Armed Services Editions during WWII.
