= State Fair (novel) =

Book by Phil Stong

- Dust jacket art for the 1932 first edition
- Author: Phil Stong
- Language: English
- Genre: Realistic fiction
- Published: 1932 by Century Co. of Philadelphia
- Publication place: United States
- ISBN: 9780854681877

State Fair is a 1932 novel by Phil Stong about an Iowa farm family's visit to the Iowa State Fair, where the family's two teenage children each fall in love, but ultimately break up with their respective new loves and return to their familiar life back on the farm. Thomas Leslie, the author of Iowa State Fair: Country Comes to Town, wrote that the novel State Fair is "a surprisingly dark coming-of-age story that took as its major plot device the effects of the 'worldly temptations' of the Iowa State Fair on a local farming family", capturing tensions between urban Des Moines and rural Iowa.

The novel is apparently set in 1928: two fairgoers are overheard discussing the merits of the presidential candidates Herbert Hoover (born in West Branch, Iowa) and Al Smith (on page 109). Also, the wise Storekeeper character later says "We're going to have a depression and a big one before another year's out." (p. 262)

The novel became a bestseller and established Stong as a popular author. In 1933, the novel was made into a Hollywood film starring Will Rogers, albeit with the addition of a happy "Hollywood ending" not in the book. It was adapted for the stage and screen several more times, including as a Rodgers and Hammerstein movie musical in 1945.

== Plot ==
The novel follows the Frake family from the fictional town of Brunswick, Iowa. Father Abel believes his Hampshire boar, "Blue Boy", can win the Iowa State Fair grand championship. He bets the local storekeeper that "Blue Boy" will win and that every Frake will have a good time and be better off for attending the fair. The pessimistic storekeeper accepts the bet, but also wagers that if he, the storekeeper loses, it means something "worse than anything you can think of" will have happened to the Frakes at the fair, and unbeknownst to Abel.

Mother Melissa wants her pickles to win blue ribbons, beating the previous winners. Teen son Wayne has been practicing to win the "hoop-la" ring toss to get revenge on the crooked carnival barker who cheated him in previous years. Wayne worries that his girlfriend, Eleanor, a college student, has grown too sophisticated for him. Younger sister, Margy, just wants a break from everyday farm life. She is bored with her devoted but dull boyfriend, Harry Ware, who has already planned their lives as farmers. Neither Eleanor nor Harry can attend the fair, while both Wayne and Margy are ready for new romances.

At the fair, Abel's hog and Melissa's pickles win blue ribbons. Wayne and Margy both meet and romantically fall for people quite different from themselves. At the hoop-la stand, Wayne meets Emily, the motherless daughter of a stock show manager who lives a rootless life, residing in hotels, following horse shows, horse races and carnivals. While Emily's father is preoccupied with horses, womanizing, and gambling, she is mostly on her own.

Emily uses her inside knowledge of horse racing to make money by betting, wears short skirts, goes to the theater, and drinks alcohol despite Prohibition. Emily gives Wayne his first drink and seduces him in her hotel room. On the fair's last night, Wayne proposes, but Emily refuses. She loves Wayne, but does not want to give up her cosmopolitan lifestyle and live on a farm. Instead, Emily plans to spend her large horse-racing winnings on one last night of fun with Wayne before saying a "fond farewell".

While riding the roller coaster, Margy meets Pat Gilbert, a reporter for the Des Moines Register. Pat is worldly and widely travelled, having worked in numerous cities. He has had other girlfriends but is drawn to Margy despite her relative naivety. Margy finds him more exciting than the predictable Harry Ware. The two fall in love, and Margy loses her virginity to Pat. He proposes marriage, but Margy ultimately turns Pat down. She loves him, but doubts he could adjust to living in a small town and knows Pat's career ambitions is to work in New York City; Margy also does not believe she is suitable for big-city life. She realizes that while she does not love Harry, she loves "his kind of life," and decides to marry him.

The Frake family returns home, with Wayne and Margy both in somber moods. Abel and Melissa are mostly unaware of their children's romantic escapades during the fair, especially having premarital sex, regarded as a serious moral breach in that time and place, particularly if the partners did not later marry. The Frakes assume that Wayne and Margy are simply sad the fair ended. Though they are temporarily despondent, Wayne and Margy, having each learned a life lesson and come-of-age, are ready to return to the farm and resume relationships with their previous partners, Eleanor and Harry.

Upon returning home, Abel Frake collects his five-dollar bet from the storekeeper, as "Blue Boy" won the grand prize and the entire family had a good time. The storekeeper pays his bet, but looking at Wayne and Margy, suspects his prediction came true that something "worse than anything you can think of" occurred at the fair without Abel's knowledge.

== Development ==
Before writing State Fair, Iowa native Stong worked as a writer for various newspapers and advertising agencies, and had written twelve unpublished novels. In 1931, Stong's wife, Virginia Maude Swaine, suggested that he write a story about the Iowa State Fair. Although Stong and his wife were living in New York City by that time, Stong was familiar with the fair; he had attended it while growing up in Iowa, had previously covered its evening stock shows when he worked for the Des Moines Register, and his grandfather had been the superintendent of the fair's swine division for several years.

Stong proceeded to write 10,000 words of his novel in only three days. Stong was further encouraged to finish the book by his agent, who told him that publishers were seeking "a Sinclair Lewis story more humorous and fairer to small town people than Main Street".

Robert A. McCown wrote in his foreword to the 1996 University of Iowa Press edition of State Fair that the work "is very much an Iowa book, filled with incidents and details from the author's own life." However, McCown noted that although the early 20th century state fair setting was "accurately portrayed", Stong was a novelist, not a historian, and that "there is undeniably an element of make-believe" in the work. According to McCown, Stong wrote "an artistic representation of the fair, not presenting the literal truth."

== Reception ==
The book was originally published in the late spring of 1932 by The Century Company of Philadelphia. Although Stong expected it to sell about 10,000 copies, it greatly exceeded his expectations, becoming a bestseller in New York, Chicago, and other major cities, and then being named a Literary Guild selection, causing sales to further skyrocket. Grosset and Dunlap reprinted the book in 1933. Other editions followed, including paperbacks, foreign editions, and one for members of the United States Armed Forces. State Fair continued to attract readers for decades and is considered to be Stong's most successful work.

While most reviews were favorable, the book met with some disapproval on moral grounds. Many Iowans perceived the Frake daughter and son's behavior as "loose", and Stong wrote to a friend at the time that "Iowa generally felt that Iowa girls wouldn't do such things." The city library in Stong's hometown of Keosauqua, Iowa banned the book as immoral for 25 years. Some reviewers also criticized the book's rosy depiction of farm life as unrealistic in the midst of the economic troubles farmers were then facing during the Great Depression.

Due to the success of State Fair, Stong was able to quit his newspaper and advertising jobs. Stong bought his mother's family farm, the George C. Duffield Estate, with proceeds from the book and subsequently made improvements and leased the property.

== Adaptations ==
The novel was adapted, under the same title, into three feature films released to theaters, a stage musical, and a television movie. In the three feature film versions and the musical, the ending is consistently changed from the book so that Margy, after returning home from the fair, is contacted by her love interest Pat Gilbert (renamed "Jerry Dundee" in the 1962 film) and happily reunites with him. The character of Emily, including her name, her profession, and the circumstances of her breakup with Wayne, underwent the most change, being slightly different in each of the adaptations. The 1976 television version changed many aspects of the original story, including most of the character names, and kept only the basic concept of an Iowa farm family going to the Iowa State Fair, where the family's son and daughter find romance.

Actor George Golden appeared in all four State Fair films, appearing in the 1976 television movie at the age of 71.

=== 1933 feature film ===
In 1933, Hollywood quickly followed up on the popular success of the previous year's bestselling novel by releasing the first version of State Fair – a Pre-Code black-and-white non-musical film starring Janet Gaynor as Margy Frake and Will Rogers as her father Abel. In this version, the Emily character is an older, sophisticated trapeze artist named Emily Joyce, who seduces Wayne, with the most suggestive scene later being cut from the film when it was reissued two years after its release. But Emily ultimately refuses to marry Wayne, implying that while she loves him, he is too good for her. Director Henry King changed the ending of the original novel for the film version, so that instead of Margy marrying her hometown boyfriend Harry, Pat telephones Margy at home after the fair, then drives to her house and the couple embrace as the film ends.

=== 1945 feature film ===
In 1945, the second version of State Fair was released: a Technicolor musical starring Jeanne Crain as Margy and Dana Andrews as Pat, and featuring Rodgers and Hammerstein songs written originally for the film, rather than for a stage musical. In this version, Wayne (played by Dick Haymes) falls in love with Emily Edwards (played by Vivian Blaine), the singer of a dance band performing at the Fair, and competes with the male singer in her band for her affections, before finding out from a song promoter that she is already unhappily married and didn't want to tell him. Margy and Pat again reunite after the fair.

=== 1962 musical film ===
In 1962, the musical was updated and remade into the third version of State Fair starring Pat Boone as Wayne and Ann-Margret as Emily, but with the setting moved to the Texas State Fair and the "Pat Gilbert" newspaper reporter character changed to a television interviewer named "Jerry Dundee" (played by Bobby Darin). This version also featured additional songs written by Richard Rodgers. In this version, Wayne aims to compete in an automobile race at the fair and get revenge on a competitor who previously bested and insulted him. Wayne gets engaged to Emily Porter, a showgirl at the fair, but after Emily overhears Melissa referring to her as "trash", she tearfully breaks up with Wayne, claiming that her career is more important. As in the earlier versions, Margy and her love interest, Jerry, reunite after the fair.

=== Stage musical ===
The Rodgers and Hammerstein film version set in Iowa was later produced as a stage musical with some additional songs, mostly composed for other Rodgers and Hammerstein productions. It premiered in St. Louis, Missouri in 1969, starring Ozzie and Harriet Nelson as Abel and Melissa Frake. In 1996, David Merrick produced a revised Broadway version featuring John Davidson as Abel, Andrea McArdle as Margy, and Donna McKechnie as Emily, which ran for 118 performances.

The production was co-directed by James Hammerstein and Randy Skinner and choreographed by Skinner. Wayne's love affair is portrayed similarly to the 1945 film; the character Emily Arden is a singer at the fair who refuses to marry Wayne because she has already been married and walked out on her husband, and does not want to hurt Wayne in the same way, choosing instead to focus on her singing career. Unlike in the film, Emily reveals this to Wayne herself. As in the previous films, Margy and Pat reunite at the end.

=== 1976 television film ===
In 1976, an additional made-for-television adaptation, updating the story to the 1970s and starring Vera Miles as mother Melissa, with the family name changed from "Frake" to "Bryant", other names changed and a second son and grandson added to the family, was produced in 1976 as a pilot for CBS. The pilot focused on teenage son Wayne Bryant (Mitch Vogel), an aspiring country musician, and his efforts to win a musical talent competition at the Iowa State Fair, while falling in love with a young singer named Bobbie Jean Shaw (Linda Purl) who is also competing. The daughter character, named "Karen" rather than "Margy", is married but separated from her husband and has a young son; she becomes attracted to a former classmate she meets at the fair. The pilot did not result in a series.

== Sequel ==
Stong was not pleased with director Henry King's decision to create a "Hollywood ending" for the initial film version of State Fair by reuniting Margy with Pat after the fair. Twenty years after the publication of State Fair, Stong published a sequel, Return in August (1953), in which Margy, now a widow after Harry's sudden death, and Pat, now a successful reporter for elite magazines, meet again at the Iowa State Fair and resume their romance.
