= Sonya Levien =

American screenwriter (1888–1960)

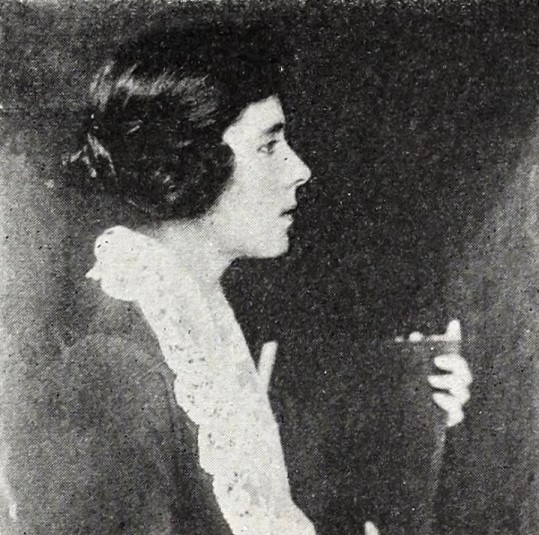
- From a 1925 magazine
- Born: 25 December 1888; Panimunik, Kovno Governorate, Russian Empire
- Died: 19 March 1960 (aged 71); Hollywood, California, US
- Other name: Sonya Hovey
- Occupation: Screenwriter
- Years active: 1921–1960
- Spouses: Carl Hovey (m. 1917; died 1956)

Sonya Levien (born Sara Opesken; 25 December 1888 – 19 March 1960) was a Russian-born American screenwriter. She became one of the highest earning female screenwriters in Hollywood in the 1930s and would help a number of directors and film stars transition from silent films to talkies. In 1955 she received an Academy Award for her screenplay Interrupted Melody.

== Early life ==
Sara Opesken (Sonya being the Russian diminutive) was born in Panimunik, a small village, now part of Kaunas, Lithuania, in the Pale of Settlement on 25 December 1888 (later changing the date to 1898.) The oldest child to parents Julius (b. ca. 1863) and Fanny (b.ca. 1865), Sonya had two brothers, Arnold and Max.

During this period, Russian authorities kept a watchful eye over citizens, especially Jewish people with radical affiliations. Sonya's father had a remote connection with a radical newspaper as well as agreeing with the anarchist ideas of Prince Peter Kropotkin. Julius Opesken also joined a Narodnik study circle before being arrested and put to work in the Siberian mines. While their father served his time, the Opesken family moved in with Julius' father, a rabbi, who stressed the importance of language to a young Sonya. Her grandfather instructed her in Russian, French, German, and Hebrew as well as encouraging her to read from the Talmud and the Shulhan' Aruk on a daily basis.

In 1891, her father escaped exile and made his way to America, choosing to take on the surname of his German rescuer, Levien. He brought the rest of his family over in 1896, where they joined him on the Lower East Side of Manhattan. They were not the only Russian Jews between 1891 and 1900, in these nine years over 150,000 Jews came to New York alone. Once settled in America, her parents had two more sons, Edward and Nathan. The family received their naturalization papers in 1905.

All of the children in her family worked through school to help with expenses. Sonya worked in a feather-duster factory throughout her teenage years, making four dollars each week. During her formative years in America, having grown up in poverty, she joined a group of socialists. Sonya, like many other European immigrants in America, went to a public grammar school. After she finished in 1901 or 1902, she was unable to continue to high school due to financial issues. She took out a loan for $36 in order to learn stenography and get a job as a secretary. It took her four years of work to repay this loan. During her time as a secretary she also became acquainted with settlement work and labor unions. Sonya also managed to take some classes at the Educational Alliance where, in 1903, she met Rose Pastor. Not only did Pastor hire her as a secretary, she was also a member of the Socialist Party and the Women's Trade Union League, giving Sonya access to a whole library of texts on these subjects she could read.

Levien began to write her own work by sending in short comedic squibs to Life and with these earnings was able to contribute to her college tuition and her family's well-being. By fall 1906, she enrolled at New York University Law School for a Certificate of Law, seeing it as a more practical job option than writing, however she still wrote short scenes for productions at her university. Just a year later, she was hired as a secretary to the editor of Success, Samuel Merwin. Here, her duties began to span more than secretary jurisdiction. She also read manuscripts, rewrote articles, sometimes even collaborated with an author.

In 1909, she went for admission to the New York State Bar Association, but discovered she was too sympathetic in character to work in a court of law. Instead she chose her work at Success and received a promotion to fiction reader. Success had its last publication in December 1911 and Levien's next employment came from the Woman's Journal, a publication interested in the women's suffrage movement. She worked there in 1912 as an assistant editor and business manager. Towards the end of 1912 she sent a short story to Carl Hovey, who was a co-editor at the time, and began work at The Metropolitan.

Having retained a connection with her roots, Sonya helped out at the People's Institute, an organization which helped supply immigrants with the skills they might need to join the workforce in America. She also worked on the National Board of Censorship as an Educational Secretary. However, when World War I commenced, Levien was working in London covering the British Suffragist movement for fourteen months in 1913 and 1914. Here she wrote editorials urging women to demand for more than just suffrage and ask for education, as well as other institutional reforms and better living conditions.

== Career ==
Sonya returned to America in 1914 and focused her creative efforts on writing. She sent stories to a number of publications including Saturday Evening Post, Collier’s, Redbook, Ladies Home Journal, Harpers, Cosmopolitan, Atlantic Monthly, and Century. She then moved onto writing melodramas, although her success in this endeavor was not immediate. In 1919 she received her first credit for an original story, the film Who Will Marry Me? Her second credit came in 1921, and incidentally Cheated Love followed a Jewish immigrant, named Sonya who is in love with a doctor above her social standing. She did additional story on this project.

By the end of 1921, Famous Players–Lasky bought two of her stories "The Heart of Youth" and "Baby Doll" paying her $2500 and $3000 respectively. Feedback for Baby Doll was mixed, but was eventually made into the film The Top of New York. These stories gave Sonya the opportunity of a contract: she would receive $24,000 her first year there and receive a raise of $5000 each year for five consequent years. This led her to move west, to Hollywood, leaving her family behind in New York. She worked tirelessly and received three Hollywood credits for The Snow Bride, Pink Gods, and The Exciters.

Yet, by 1923, she missed her young son Serge and felt she had the duty to support her husband's career over her own, so she broke her contract by Famous Players–Lasky and returned to her family. Here she received an editorial position at McClure's Magazine. Shortly after, in fall of 1924, Famous Players–Lasky requested she adapt a novel, Salome of the Tenements, for the screen, the story of which actually paralleled Sonya's own life story. She made a great many changes to the plot, however reviews for the film highlighted the directing and not the script work. Next, she did scenario editing work at Samuel Goldwyn Pictures. For this job, she attended Broadway plays and would find ways to adapt them into films. By this time, her husband's editing work had ended and they decided to move together this time to Hollywood. He would edit stories for C.B. DeMille and Sonya would write scenarios. Unfortunately Carl would not do so well in Hollywood, unable to find another job after DeMille. Sonya found herself with regular work and as the main breadwinner in the family. Not only did she write for film, but she also continued as an author for magazines and even tried her hand at plays, such as the one-act "By the Sword" which was performed by The Writer's Club.

Despite being a woman, Sonya managed to avoid being categorized as someone who wrote only films for women. She was experienced in all genres (null Western or Gangster films.) Her forte came in adapting outside material for film. She worked her first four years back in Hollywood with the name Sonya Hovey for a number of different studios. She worked for Warner Bros. from January to June 1926. Here, she wrote her first comedy, a move from her usual melodramas. Footloose Widows featured mistaken identities, mix ups between poor and wealthy people, and even gold digging- all elements of the screwball comedy genre.

She was hired by C.B. DeMille in August 1926 for Metropolitan Pictures and Pathé. She worked for him until June 1928 and during this time experimented in genre. In autumn, she signed with Columbia Pictures, where she wrote a number of features until March 1929. She was elected to the board of The Writer's Club and in May 1929 was offered a contract at Fox Film Corp. She would stay with them until 1939. Her first yearly contract supplied her with $500/ week, and after the first six months she received $600/ week. One year renewal options granted her $750. But although her pay was good, legally she was not able to receive screen credit or publicity for each project she contributed to. She had to pay to advertise her own name. Nonetheless, Sonya became one of the top writers which allowed her to work alongside big stars and well-known directors. In the years 1929–1935, she would work on an estimated six screenplays a year, receiving about five credits. During this period, she was able to write four films for Charles Farrell and Janet Gaynor, two more for Janet Gaynor, five for Will Rogers, and have a total of six of her stories directed by Frank Borzage. She also worked with directors Allan Dwan and John Ford. Although uncredited, she made additions for Shirley Temple in Curly Top.

Sonya garnered a reputation for being able to adapt all kinds of material into a film screenplay, although she was not known for her prowess at dialogue. For Fox, she penned a detective thriller Behind that Curtain, featuring Charlie Chan. She worked at length with Frank Borzage on Lucky Star, only to have it be labelled Frank Borzage's Lucky Star. Sonya helped not only Borzage, but also Will Rogers, transition to sound films. She also collaborated with S.N. Behrman in three of the next six projects she would assist on.

Levien was Fox's highest-paid female screenwriter during the 1930s. Her films were also known for dealing with family conflicts. In 1933, still employed by Fox Studios, Sonya would receive an Oscar nomination for State Fair. She penned John Ford's first Technicolor film in 1939, Drums Along the Mohawk. She also worked for RKO, working on Hunchback of Notre Dame in 1939 as well.

She then went on to sign a contract with Metro-Goldwyn-Mayer in 1941. By 1955, she had won an Academy Award for Interrupted Melody for MGM. Sonya garnered an impressive filmography, having worked on over 70 films spanning her career, a great deal of the time without a collaborator. In fact, she was presented with the first Laurel Award presented from the Screenwriters Guild of America. Her last screen credits included Jeanne Eagels from 1957 and in 1960, she would receive her final screen credit for Pepe.

== Personal life ==
Levien married her husband Carl Hovey on 11 October 1917. They moved together to East 92nd street in New York, and Sonya took in Hovey's two children from his previous marriage. Hovey was an Anglo-Saxon Protestant but they had little protest from either of their families and even decided to declare their own children Jewish, although they would not enforce a religious upbringing on them. Together they had two children: a son, Serge (b. 1920) and a daughter, Tamara (b. 1923.) Although Levien has stated that her instincts told her she should have six or seven children, she found that a large family would take years away from her career and was not financially suitable for her. In fact, her husband failed to find steady employment once they moved to Hollywood together and she bore the responsibility of supporting him, their children, his two children from a previous marriage, as well as making a comfortable home for them.

Levien has described herself as one who enjoys music, singing and playing the piano, as well as reading biographies. Although she admired nice clothing, she usually wore sports clothes and hated going shopping. Sonya generally avoided confrontation and arguments with her acquaintances, and shied away from talking on the telephone. She self-identified as ambitious, but also restless in character. Those she worked with stated that Levien was easy to work with and would help out others often. Her husband died in 1956 and she developed cancer in the mid 1950s. Sonya Levien died on 19 March 1960 at the age of 71.

=== Political beliefs ===
Levien was a Secular Jew who was very interested in activism in her early years, living on the East Side of New York. She describes her natural pull to more radical views, joining a group of agitators formed majorly of socialists but which also included anarchists and single-taxers. Levien was known for supporting the suffragette cause in the early 20th century. Both in her film and non-film works, Levien wrote about the struggles of immigrant women and families. Levien belonged to the Heterodoxy club, which was a debate group focusing on radical feminism. She also heavily supported women's emancipation and birth control. Many of the films in the beginnings of her career focused on Jewish people, however many of her female characters found their happiness in wedlock, and signs of her own radical sensibilities were not always apparent in her film work. Once in Hollywood she was known as an apolitical woman. In fact, shortly after 1950, her daughter Tamara and her husband, Lee Gold, were blacklisted as members of the Communist Party, Sonya chose never to comment publicly.

== Selected filmography ==
- Cheated Love (1921)
- First Love (1921)
- The Top of New York (1922)
- Pink Gods (1922)
- The Snow Bride (1923)
- The Exciters (1923)
- Salome of the Tenements (1925)
- Why Girls Go Back Home (1926)
- Christine of the Big Tops (1926)
- The Princess from Hoboken (1927)
- The Heart Thief (1927)
- A Harp in Hock (1927)
- A Ship Comes In (1928)
- The Power of the Press (1928)
- The Younger Generation (1929)
- Trial Marriage (1929)
- Behind That Curtain (1929)
- Lucky Star (1929)
- Frozen Justice (1929)
- South Sea Rose (1929)
- So This Is London (1930)
- Song o' My Heart (1930)
- Liliom (1930)
- Lightnin' (1930)
- Daddy Long Legs (1931)
- The Brat (1931)
- Surrender (1931)
- Delicious (1931)
- She Wanted a Millionaire (1932)
- After Tomorrow (1932)
- Rebecca of Sunnybrook Farm (1932)
- Tess of the Storm Country (1932)
- Cavalcade (1933)
- State Fair (1933)
- The Warrior's Husband (1933)
- Berkeley Square (1933)
- Mr. Skitch (1933)
- As Husbands Go (1934)
- Change of Heart (1934)
- The White Parade (1934)
- Here's to Romance (1935)
- Navy Wife (1935)
- Paddy O'Day (1936)
- The Country Doctor (1936)
- Ramona (1936)
- Reunion (1936)
- In Old Chicago (1937)
- Four Men and a Prayer (1938)
- Kidnapped (1938)
- The Cowboy and the Lady (1938)
- Drums Along the Mohawk (1939)
- The Hunchback of Notre Dame (1939)
- Ziegfeld Girl (1941)
- The Amazing Mrs. Holliday (1943)
- The Valley of Decision (1945)
- State Fair (1945)
- The Green Years (1946)
- The Great Caruso (1951)
- Quo Vadis (1951)
- The Merry Widow (1952)
- The Student Prince (1954)
- Hit the Deck (1955)
- Interrupted Melody (1955)
- Oklahoma! (1955)
- Bhowani Junction (1956)
- Jeanne Eagels (1957)
- Pepe (1960)
- State Fair (1962)

== See also ==
- List of Russian Americans
- List of Russian Academy Award winners and nominees
