= Pittsburg, Van Buren County, Iowa =

Pittsburg, Iowa
- Unincorporated community
- Location within the state of Iowa Pittsburg, Iowa (the United States)
- Coordinates: 40°44′47″N 91°59′31″W
- Country: United States
- State: Iowa
- County: Van Buren
- Elevation: 587 ft (179 m)
- Time zone: UTC-6 (Central (CST))
  - Summer (DST): UTC-5 (CDT)
- ZIP codes: 52565
- Area code: 319
- GNIS feature ID: 460198

Pittsburg is an unincorporated community in Van Buren County, Iowa, United States. It is located at 40.75639ºN and 91.99167ºW.

== History ==
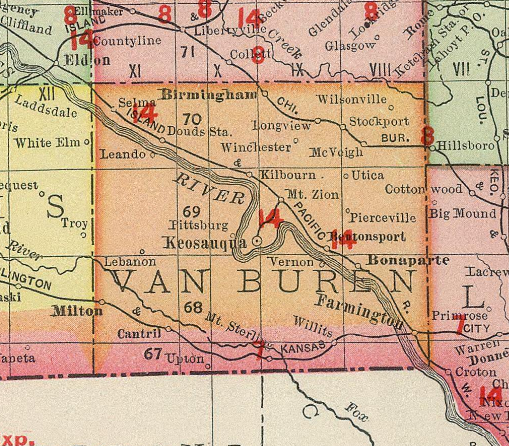
Pittsburg in Van Buren County Iowa in 1903

Pittsburg was laid out in 1839, and it was originally known as Rising Sun. It was named in honor of Pittsburgh, Pennsylvania.

Pittsburg's population was 80 in 1925. The population was 55 in 1940.

== Geography ==
Pittsburg is located at 40°44′47″N 91°59′31″W (40.75639, -91.99167).

== Notable person ==
Phil Stong was born in Pittsburg on January 27, 1899
