= State Fair (1933 film) =

1933 film by Henry King

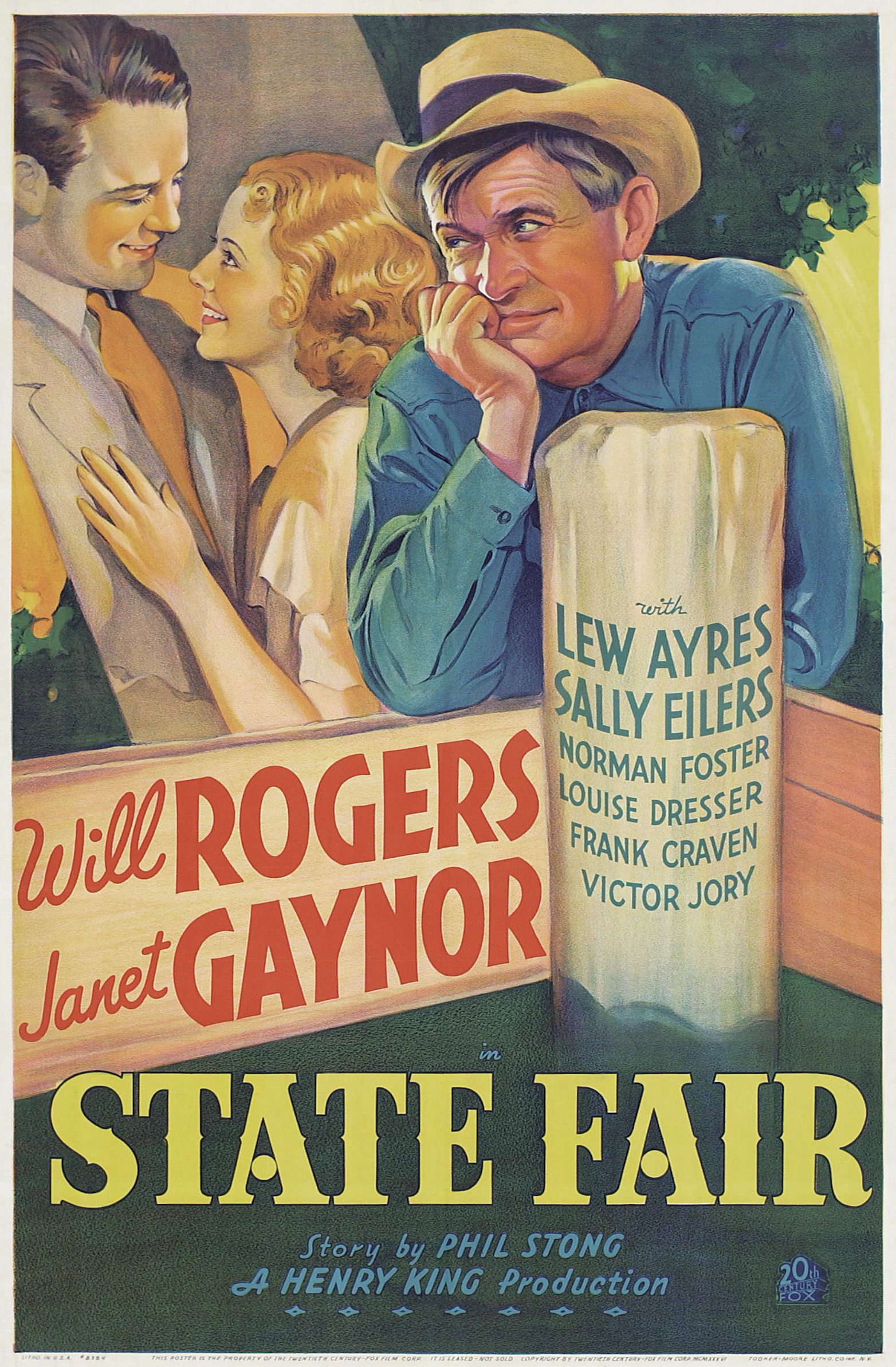
- Theatrical release poster
- Directed by: Henry King
- Screenplay by: Sonya Levien; Paul Green
- Based on: State Fair by Phil Stong
- Produced by: Henry King
- Starring: Janet Gaynor; Will Rogers; Lew Ayres
- Cinematography: Hal Mohr
- Edited by: Robert Bischoff
- Music by: Louis De Francesco
- Distributed by: Fox Film Corporation
- Release date: February 10, 1933
- Running time: 97 minutes
- Budget: $600,000
- Box office: $1,208,000 (rentals)

State Fair is a 1933 American comedy-drama film directed by Henry King and starring Janet Gaynor, Will Rogers, and Lew Ayres. The pre-Code film tells the story of a farm family's multi-day visit to the Iowa State Fair, where the parents seek to win prizes in agricultural and cooking competitions, and their teenage daughter and son each find unexpected romance.

Based on the bestselling 1932 novel by Phil Stong, this was the first of four film adaptations of the novel. The others were State Fair (1945) starring Jeanne Crain and Dana Andrews, State Fair (1962) starring Ann-Margret and Pat Boone, and State Fair (1976) starring Vera Miles and Tim O'Connor. The 1933 film was nominated for an Academy Award for Best Picture and Best Adapted Screenplay, losing to Cavalcade and Little Women respectively.

In 2014, State Fair was selected for preservation in the National Film Registry by the Library of Congress.

== Plot ==
In the fictional town of Brunswick, Iowa, farmer Abel Frake prepares to transport his Hampshire pig, Blue Boy, to compete at the hog contest at the Iowa State Fair. Confident he will win the first-place prize, and nothing bad will happen, Abel bets five dollars against his neighbor Fred Cramer. Abel's wife Melissa, is preparing pickles and mincemeat for the food competition.

Against his wife's insistence, Abel secretly adds apple brandy. Unsure about her chances of winning, Melissa adds the remaining brandy. Meanwhile, Abel's daughter Margy reconnects with childhood friend Harry Ware. He is unable to attend the fair because he is preoccupied with his dairy farm. Margy's brother, Wayne, arrives home from college to attend the fair.

After the Frakes arrive at the fair, Abel notices Blue Boy appears ill. At a carnival hoop toss game, Wayne throws the rings perfectly and meets Emily Joyce, a trapeze artist. Later that night, Wayne and Margy venture out to the circus fair. Wayne separates from his sister, and sees Emily perform a trapeze stunt. Meanwhile, Margy rides the roller coaster ride, seated next to Pat Gilbert, a newspaper reporter. When the roller coaster descends rapidly, Gilbert holds her tightly. After their ride together, the two bond over their connection to Brunswick, and have lemonade.

The next morning, Melissa notices how emotionally elevated her two children are. Abel inspects Blue Boy, and the hog appears to be healthy again. Back at the circus, Pat reconnects with Margy, in which they decide to be friends rather than romantic lovers. They plan to meet again at Melissa's competition, which Pat is covering for his newspaper. At the food competition, Melissa wins the first-place prize for both her pickles and mincemeat. Having fallen in love, Pat and Margy then watch a harness horse race and walk through the woods later that night.

Back at Emily's place, she and Wayne share drinks. Emily changes into her nightgown, and the two sleep together. The next morning, Abel tries to wake up Blue Boy for the hog contest, succeeding at the last minute. The hog judges inspect Blue Boy, and award Abel first prize.

Later that night, Wayne apologizes to his father for missing the hog contest. Wayne and Margy both leave for their final night at the fair. Alone with Melissa, Abel reads in the newspaper that one of the food judges is sick from delirium after eating Melissa's brandy-spiked mincemeat.

Despite their love, Emily decides not to marry Wayne. On their final night, Margy tells Pat about her feeling for Harry back home. Meanwhile, Abel and Melissa enjoy the amusement rides together. As the Frakes leave the state fair, Melissa notices her children's despondent demeanor. Back home, Melissa confesses putting apple brandy in her mincemeat. Abel collects his five-dollar bet from Fred. Margy, still depressed, receives a phone call from Pat and runs out into a rainstorm to reunite with him.

== Production ==
Though the adaptation deleted a storyline about a sexual relationship between the daughter and a journalist, it retained a similar storyline about the seduction of the son (Norman Foster) by a trapeze artist (Sally Eilers). This caused trouble with the Hays Commission when Fox re-released the film in 1935. The censors insisted on the deletion of a scene where Foster and Eilers are heard talking off screen while the camera shows a rumpled bed and a discarded negligee. The cut scene has never been restored.

== Cast ==
- Janet Gaynor as Margy Frake
- Will Rogers as Abel Frake
- Lew Ayres as Pat Gilbert
- Sally Eilers as Emily Joyce
- Norman Foster as Wayne Frake
- Louise Dresser as Melissa Frake
- Frank Craven as Storekeeper
- Victor Jory as Hoop Toss Barker
- Frank Melton as Harry Ware
- Erville Alderson as Martin (uncredited)
- Hobart Cavanaugh as Professor Fred Coin (uncredited)
- Harry Holman as Professor Tyler Cramp (uncredited)
