= Charles Bennett (actor) =

American actor (1891–1943)

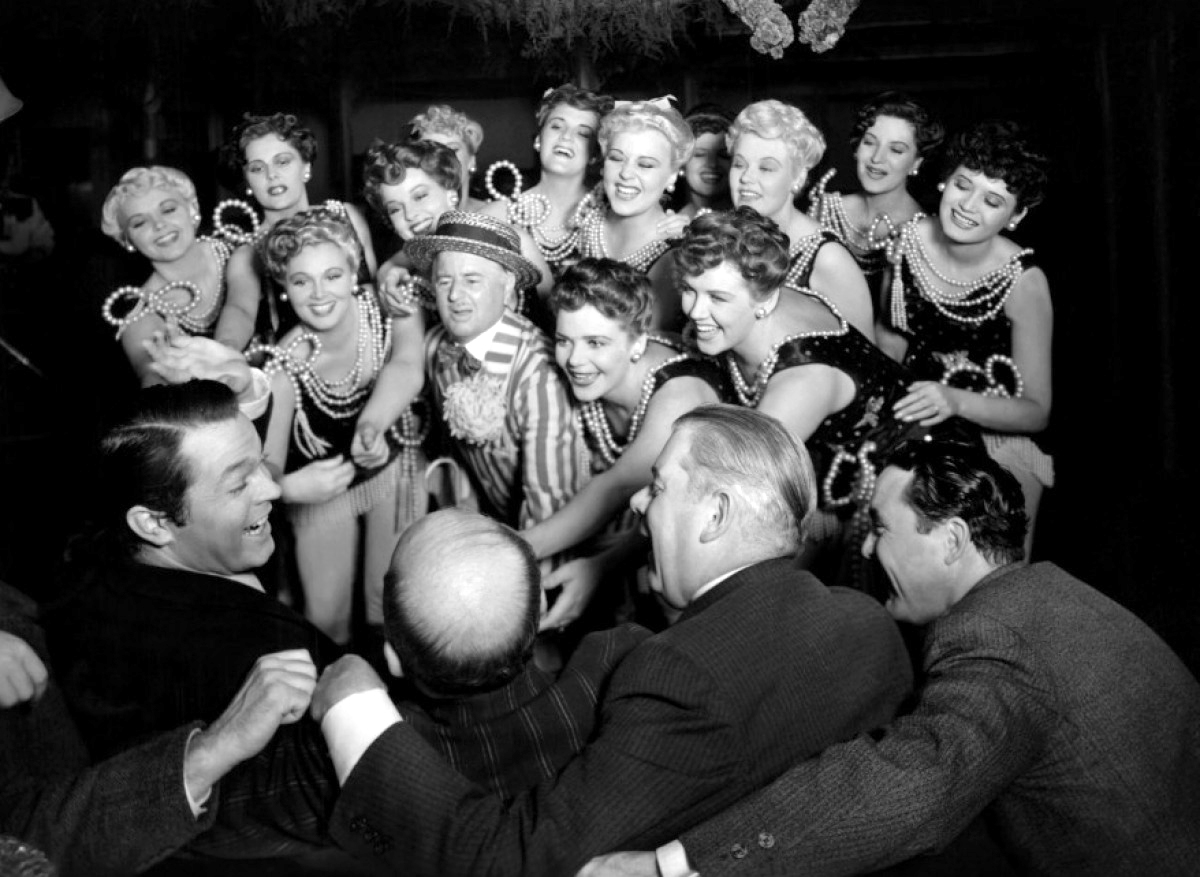
- Charles Bennett (in straw hat) leading the chorus girls in "Oh, Mr. Kane!" in Orson Welles's Citizen Kane (1941)
- Born: April 13, 1891; Dunedin, New Zealand
- Died: February 15, 1943 (aged 53); Hollywood, California, U.S.
- Years active: 1912–1943
- Spouse: Eileen "Dottie" Brown (m. 1914)

Charles Bennett (13 April 1891 – 15 February 1943) was an American actor who performed in vaudeville and as an extra in Hollywood talkies.

== Biography ==
Charles Joseph Bennett was born in Dunedin, New Zealand, and died in Hollywood, California. He grew up in Melbourne Australia, and arrived in North America in 1912 with the Pollard's Lilliputian Opera Company. After a long career on stage in vaudeville in the United States and Canada he appeared as a featured extra in talkies. Perhaps the most recognizable role of his later film career was as the entertainer in the Inquirer party sequence in Citizen Kane (1941), who performs the song "Oh, Mr. Kane!" He was the father of child star Mickey Bennett.

== Partial filmography ==
- Narcotic (1933) - Hand Wrestler
- Treasure Island (1934) - Dandy Dawson - Pirate of the Spanish Main
- I Live My Life (1935) - Stewart (uncredited)
- Lloyd's of London (1936) - Coster (uncredited)
- Born to Dance (1936) - Quartet Member (uncredited)
- Step Lively, Jeeves! (1937) - Steward (uncredited)
- The Road Back (1937) - Innkeeper (uncredited)
- The Man Who Cried Wolf (1937) - Taxi Manager (uncredited)
- A Damsel in Distress (1937) - Carnival Barker (uncredited)
- The Adventures of Robin Hood (1938) - Peddler at tournament (uncredited)
- Mysterious Mr. Moto (1938) - Cockney Singer (uncredited)
- Gunga Din (1939) - Telegraph Operator (uncredited)
- The Light That Failed (1939) - Soldier (uncredited)
- Adventure in Diamonds (1940) - Cockney Sailor (uncredited)
- Citizen Kane (1941) - the Entertainer at the head of the chorus line in the Inquirer party sequence (uncredited)
- Man Hunt (1941) - Costermonger (uncredited)
- A Yank in the R.A.F. (1941) - Man on Stretcher (uncredited)
- Mrs. Miniver (1942) - Milkman (uncredited)
- Random Harvest (1942) - Porter (uncredited)
- It Ain't Hay (1943) - SPCA Driver (uncredited) (final film role)
