= State Fair (1945 film) =

1945 original musical film

- Theatrical release poster
- Directed by: Walter Lang
- Screenplay by: Oscar Hammerstein II; Sonya Levien (adaptation); Paul Green (adaptation)
- Based on: State Fair 1933 film by Sonya Levien; Paul Green; State Fair 1932 novel by Phil Stong
- Produced by: William Perlberg
- Starring: Jeanne Crain; Dana Andrews; Dick Haymes; Vivian Blaine; Charles Winninger; Fay Bainter; Donald Meek; Frank McHugh; Percy Kilbride; Harry Morgan
- Cinematography: Leon Shamroy
- Edited by: J. Watson Webb Jr.
- Music by: Richard Rodgers
- Color process: Technicolor
- Distributed by: 20th Century Fox
- Release date: August 29, 1945
- Running time: 100 minutes
- Country: United States
- Language: English
- Box office: $4 million (U.S. and Canada rentals)

State Fair is a 1945 American musical film directed by Walter Lang, with original music by Rodgers and Hammerstein. It is a musical adaptation of the 1933 film of the same name starring Janet Gaynor and Will Rogers. The 1933 film is an adaptation of the 1932 novel by Phil Stong. This 1945 Technicolor film stars Jeanne Crain, Dana Andrews, Dick Haymes, Vivian Blaine, Fay Bainter, and Charles Winninger. State Fair was remade in 1962, starring Pat Boone and Ann-Margret.

State Fair is the only Rodgers and Hammerstein musical written directly for film. The movie introduces such popular songs as "It's a Grand Night for Singing" and "It Might as Well Be Spring", which won the Academy Award for Best Original Song. Joint musical direction by Alfred Newman and Charles E. Henderson is of orchestral arrangements principally composed by Edward B. Powell.

This Rodgers and Hammerstein's original musical film was later adapted for the stage in 1969, for a production at The Muny (St. Louis Municipal Opera Theatre), a landmark amphitheatre in St. Louis, Missouri. In 1996, it was adapted again for a Broadway musical of the same name, with additional songs taken from other Rodgers and Hammerstein musicals.

== Plot ==
The Frake family prepares for the Iowa State Fair. Frake patriarch, Abel, bets his neighbor, Dave Miller, five dollars that his boar, Blue Boy, will win first prize, and that the entire Frake family will enjoy themselves with no bad experiences.

Frake matriarch, Melissa, is preparing for the food competition. Her mincemeat recipe includes brandy. She tells Abel she dislikes cooking with alcohol, though later adds the brandy unaware Abel secretly added a liberal amount. Melancholic daughter Margy welcomes the fair as a break from mundane farm life. Her fiancé, Harry, who is skipping the fair, talks about having a modern-day farm after they marry, though Margy is unenthusiastic, and maybe even about Harry. Son Wayne is disappointed that his girlfriend, Eleanor, is also unable to go.

At the fair, Wayne's first stop is the ring-tossing booth where the barker cheated him the previous year. Wayne, who has been practicing, repeatedly wins. The angry barker threatens to call the police. When a pretty girl intervenes, saying her father is the chief of police, the barker refunds Wayne's money. Wayne tries to arrange a date with the girl, but she rushes off for another appointment but promises to be on the midway that evening.

Margy meets Pat Gilbert, a reporter covering the fair for the Des Moines newspaper. He suggests spending time together during the fair, and, if things do not work out, they can amicably part ways. Margy is fascinated by Pat's stories about the many cities he has worked in; Pat says his ambition is to work for a large newspaper. The pair arrange to meet later, though Pat says if he decides to end things, he "just won't be around."

When Blue Boy seems sick, Abel's friend, Frank, brings in his prize sow pig, Esmeralda. Blue Boy quickly recovers. That evening on the midway, Pat finds Margy while Wayne looks for the girl from the ring toss booth. Wayne learns she is not the police chief's daughter, but Emily Edwards, the singer with the dance band performing at the fair. Wayne goes to the show and waits for Emily to finish her song.

Pat and Margy meet up. Although Pat has had many girlfriends, he seems genuinely interested in Margy. By the next morning, Margy has fallen for Pat, and Wayne for Emily. Abe is excited about Blue Boy's chances to win, while at the pickle and mincemeat judging, Melissa worries about her biggest competitor, who wins every year. However, Melissa wins first prize for her sour pickles and a special award for her mincemeat with the brandy.

Emily invites Wayne to the birthday party she has to host for Marty, her fellow band singer. McGee, a song plugger, has a new song he wants Emily to sing, but she and Marty brush him off. McGee asks Wayne to give a copy to Emily. Emily asks Wayne to sing, but he demurs. After Marty mocks him, Wayne sings the song with Emily to the guests' applause. Marty, who has been drinking and seems jealous, insinuates that McGee probably paid Wayne to promote the song to Emily. Wayne angrily punches Marty and walks out. Emily runs after Wayne, and they spend the rest of the evening together.

Pat asks if Margy really plans to marry Harry. Margy implies she probably will. Margy wants to know if Pat will ever marry. He claims he would not wish a guy like himself on someone, then proposes to her. Margy does not immediately answer, and they agree to meet the next night. While walking away, Margy says she could never marry anyone but Pat.

The next day, Abel rushes to ready Blue Boy for the grand champion boar competition. Abel gets Blue Boy into the judging ring, but the boar lies down and will likely lose the competition. At the last minute, Blue Boy sees Esmeralda and stands up. The judges announce Blue Boy the winner.

On the last night, while Wayne waits for Emily, McGee thanks him for helping with the song and says that Emily is singing the song the next night in Chicago, surprising Wayne. Wayne wants Emily to come to the farm rather than go to Chicago, but she refuses. She starts to reveal something but runs off crying. McGee later reveals that Emily is (unhappily) married.

Pat receives a job offer to write a syndicated column. The editor insists on them meeting in Chicago that night. Pat balks because Margy is waiting for him, but he will lose the job if he does not leave immediately. Margy waits all night for Pat, who never shows. She finally leaves, assuming Pat has brushed her off.

Back home, both Wayne and Margy are heartbroken. The next day, Abel tries to collect on the bet with Mr. Miller, but Miller notices Wayne and Margy look unhappy, meaning Abel lost. Miller asks Margy if she enjoyed the fair, but the phone rings before she answers. It is Pat, who got the columnist job. He proposes and wants Margy to go to Chicago with him. Margy accepts and excitedly tells Mr. Miller that it was the most wonderful fair ever. Abel collects his five dollars as Margy rushes off to meet Pat. They embrace in the middle of the road as Wayne, now reunited with girlfriend Eleanor, drives by, happily hugging her.

== Cast ==
- Jeanne Crain as Margy Frake
- Dana Andrews as Pat Gilbert
- Dick Haymes as Wayne Frake
- Vivian Blaine as Emily Edwards
- Charles Winninger as Abel Frake
- Fay Bainter as Melissa "Ma" Frake
- Donald Meek as Mr. Heppenstahl, the pickle and mincemeat judge
- William Marshall as Marty, the singer with Tommy Thomas` band.
- Frank McHugh as McGee, a song plugger
- Percy Kilbride as Dave Miller
- Jane Nigh as Eleanor
- Phil Brown as Harry Ware, Margy's fiancé
- Harry Morgan (credited as Henry Morgan) as a barker, who operates the ring toss booth (played in 1933 by Victor Jory)
- Blue Boy, a boar that was raised by Ed S. Rennick of Pilger, Nebraska.
- John Dehner as hog contest announcer (uncredited)
- JoAnn Dean Killingsworth as a dancer (uncredited)

=== Singers ===
Dick Haymes and Vivian Blaine were well known big band singers of the time who did their own singing. Jeanne Crain's singing voice was dubbed by Louanne Hogan. Dana Andrews's singing voice was dubbed by Ben Gage.

== Musical numbers ==
- "Our State Fair" – Sung by Percy Kilbride, Charles Winninger and Fay Bainter.
- "It Might as Well Be Spring" – Sung by Jeanne Crain (dubbed by Louanne Hogan).
- "That's for Me" – Sung by Vivian Blaine with Tommy Thomas Orchestra.
- "It's a Grand Night for Singing" – Sung by Dick Haymes, Vivian Blaine, Jeanne Crain (dubbed by Louanne Hogan), Dana Andrews (dubbed by Ben Gage) and Chorus.
- "That's for Me" (reprise) – Sung by Jeanne Crain (dubbed by Louanne Hogan) and Dick Haymes.
- "It's a Grand Night for Singing" (reprise 1) – Sung by William Marshall, Vivian Blaine and Chorus.
- "Isn't It Kind of Fun?" – Sung by Dick Haymes and Vivian Blaine.
- "All I Owe Ioway" – Sung by William Marshall, Vivian Blaine, Fay Bainter, Charles Winninger and Chorus.
- "It's a Grand Night for Singing" (reprise 2) – Sung by Dick Haymes and Chorus

== Reception ==
Bosley Crowther of The New York Times called the film "no more than an average screen musical, with a nice bucolic flavor here and there." Variety wrote: "Coupled with an excellent cast, 'Fair' retains the old charm [of the original] and yet adds some of its own. It is an excellent entertainment and should do boff b.o. Harrison's Reports called it "good, wholesome entertainment, capably directed and well acted." John McCarten of The New Yorker wrote: "'Nice,' I believe, would be the word for it; I don't think you could use anything stronger." In The Nation in 1945, critic James Agee stated, " ... pretty tunes, graceful lyrics. Otherwise lacking any real delicateness, vitality, or imagination, and painfully air-conditioned-looking, for a bucolic film; it is nevertheless good-natured and pleasant."

The film won an Academy Award for best Music (Song) It Might As Well Be Spring - Music by Richard Rodgers and Lyrics by Oscar Hammerstein II, and was nominated for best Music (Scoring of a Musical Picture) by Alfred Newman and Charles E. Henderson.

The film is recognized by American Film Institute in these lists:

- 2004: AFI's 100 Years...100 Songs:
  - "It Might as Well Be Spring" – Nominated
- 2006: AFI's Greatest Movie Musicals – Nominated

== In popular culture ==
In "The Moon is Not Blue", a 1982 episode of the television series M*A*S*H, the characters – having heard about the controversy surrounding the film The Moon Is Blue – attempt to get a copy shipped to their mobile hospital in Korea, but ultimately get State Fair instead. Harry Morgan, who played Sherman T. Potter for much of M*A*S*H's run, including the episode in question, appears in State Fair as a carnival barker.

When General George Marshall returned from his frustrating peace mission to China in 1946, he said that State Fair did more to tell the Chinese about America, “about the heart and soul and about its people than I could possibly have told them in hours of talking." Home Media* Laserdisc VHS in 1991 1999 DVD 2005
