= State Fair (1962 film) =

1962 film by José Ferrer

- Theatrical release poster
- Directed by: José Ferrer
- Screenplay by: Richard L. Breen
- Based on: State Fair; 1945 film by: Oscar Hammerstein II; Sonya Levien; Paul Green; State Fair; 1932 novel by Phil Stong
- Produced by: Charles Brackett
- Starring: Pat Boone; Bobby Darin; Pamela Tiffin; Ann-Margret; Tom Ewell; Alice Faye
- Cinematography: William C. Mellor
- Edited by: David Bretherton
- Music by: Richard Rodgers
- Distributed by: 20th Century-Fox
- Release date: March 9, 1962
- Running time: 118 minutes
- Country: United States
- Language: English
- Budget: $4.5 million
- Box office: $3.5 million (US/Canada)

State Fair is a 1962 American musical film directed by José Ferrer, with music by Rodgers and Hammerstein, and starring Pat Boone, Bobby Darin, Pamela Tiffin, Ann-Margret, Tom Ewell and Alice Faye. It is a remake of the 1945 film of the same name, in turn based on the novel by Phil Stong.

This was the third overall film adaptation of Stong's novel. The songs and score are adapted from the 1945 production, along with new songs by Rodgers. While the 1933 and 1945 versions were set at the Iowa State Fair, the 1962 version was set in Texas (the family drives through Dallas where the State Fair of Texas is held).

The film was released by 20th Century-Fox on March 9, 1962. It received mixed reviews from critics and was a financial disappointment. This was Ferrer's final film as director.

== Cast ==
Credits from the American Film Institute.

- Pat Boone as Wayne Frake
- Bobby Darin as Jerry Dundee
- Pamela Tiffin as Margy Frake
- Ann-Margret as Emily Porter
- Tom Ewell as Abel Frake
- Alice Faye as Melissa Frake
- Wally Cox as Hipplewaite
- David Brandon as Harry
- Clem Harvey as Doc Cramer
- Robert Foulk as Squat Judge
- Linda Henrich as Betty Jean
- Tap Canutt as Red Hoerter

== Production ==
20th Century-Fox production head Buddy Adler announced the film in January 1960, with Rodgers and Hammerstein slated to write new songs for it. Charles Brackett was named producer and Walter Lang was named director. It would be the third version of the film produced by Fox. Adler said that he hoped that the film would be ready by Christmas and that it would not be a musical, but "it will have plenty of songs from Rodgers and Hammerstein."

Brackett called the story "... a beautiful property. It's a story about people with simple projects with which the audience can get really involved – the man who wants his boy to get a prize, the woman interested in her mincemeat, the girl who wants adventure and finds a fast young man at the fair."

Production was delayed when Adler died in July 1960. Hammerstein died the following month, at which point Rodgers decided to write the lyrics himself.

José Ferrer had just made Return to Peyton Place for Fox and was eventually signed to direct. He described the project as "entirely a new treatment of a classic" with no "chance of a comparison with a memory or nostalgia."

The female lead was given to Ann-Margret, who was under contract to 20th Century-Fox. They had loaned her to United Artists to make her first film, Pocketful of Miracles, and this would be her second. Bound by the terms of an old commitment to Fox, she was paid only $500 a week during her three months of work on the production. Pamela Tiffin was given the role of Margy without any audition, even though none of her films had yet been released at the time, beating the long-time favorite Barbara Eden, who was ultimately deemed too attractive for the part. Andy Williams auditioned for the role of Wayne.

Alice Faye came out of retirement to play the mother. She wanted Don Ameche to play her husband, but the role went to Tom Ewell.

The film was shot in September and October 1961, mainly at the State Fair of Texas in Dallas. Other locations included Mooney's Grove park in Visalia, California and the Oklahoma State Fair Raceway in Oklahoma City, home of the Oklahoma State Fair, where the climactic speedway sequence was shot.

== Song list ==
- "Our State Fair"
- "It Might as Well Be Spring"
- "That's for Me"
- "Never Say No to a Man" (added in the 1962 version) – Lyrics and Music by Richard Rodgers
- "It's a Grand Night For Singing"
- "Willing and Eager" (added in the 1962 version) – Lyrics and Music by Richard Rodgers
- "This Isn't Heaven" (added in the 1962 version) – Lyrics and Music by Richard Rodgers
- "The Little Things In Texas" (added in the 1962 version) – Lyrics and Music by Richard Rodgers
- "More Than Just a Friend" (added in the 1962 version) – Lyrics and Music by Richard Rodgers
- "Isn't It Kind of Fun?" (moved in the 1962 version)

A soundtrack album was released briefly on Dot Records in 1962, as Boone had an exclusive contract with the label. The soundtrack was issued on CD by Varèse Sarabande in 1999 as part of a two-disc release with the soundtrack recordings from the 1945 film. Original recording session elements were used for this edition (as opposed to the Dot album masters from the 1962 LP), and due to deterioration of some of the source material, various orchestral and/or vocal cues are missing on some tracks. The soundtrack was reissued on CD again in 2016 by Stage Door Records in a limited edition release that was mastered from a stereo reel-to-reel tape. It contains the album as issued by Dot Records in 1962 with numerous bonus tracks.

== Reception ==
According to Kinematograph Weekly, the film was considered a "money maker" at the British box office in 1962. However, the native North American box office was markedly disappointing. The film grossed only $3.5 million from a $4.5 million production budget, making it a box office bomb.

Reviewing the film, Diabolique magazine later wrote:

It just doesn't work. It's not the material. Sure, it's cheesy, but The Sound of Music (1965) was cheesy and that came along three years later. I feel the main problem is too many key people were miscast. Jose Ferrer was not the right director and most of the cast fall short of their 1945 counterparts. Tom Ewell seems too urban to play "paw" compared to Charles Winninger. Pamela Tiffin looks like an urban ditz rather than a sweet naive country girl like Jeanne Crain. Bobby Darin (another pop star turned actor) comes across as sleazy rather than sharp like Dana Andrews. Ann-Margret was always better as good girls who looked as though they wanted to be naughty (Viva Las Vegas, Bye Bye Birdie) rather than straight-out naughty girls. Alice Faye looks like Alice Faye coming out of retirement (it was her last film) whereas Fay Bainter felt like a character. The one exception is Pat Boone who is far better than Dick Haymes, but he can't save things.

The lukewarm reception triggered the end of José Ferrer's film directing career.
