= James Taylor discography =

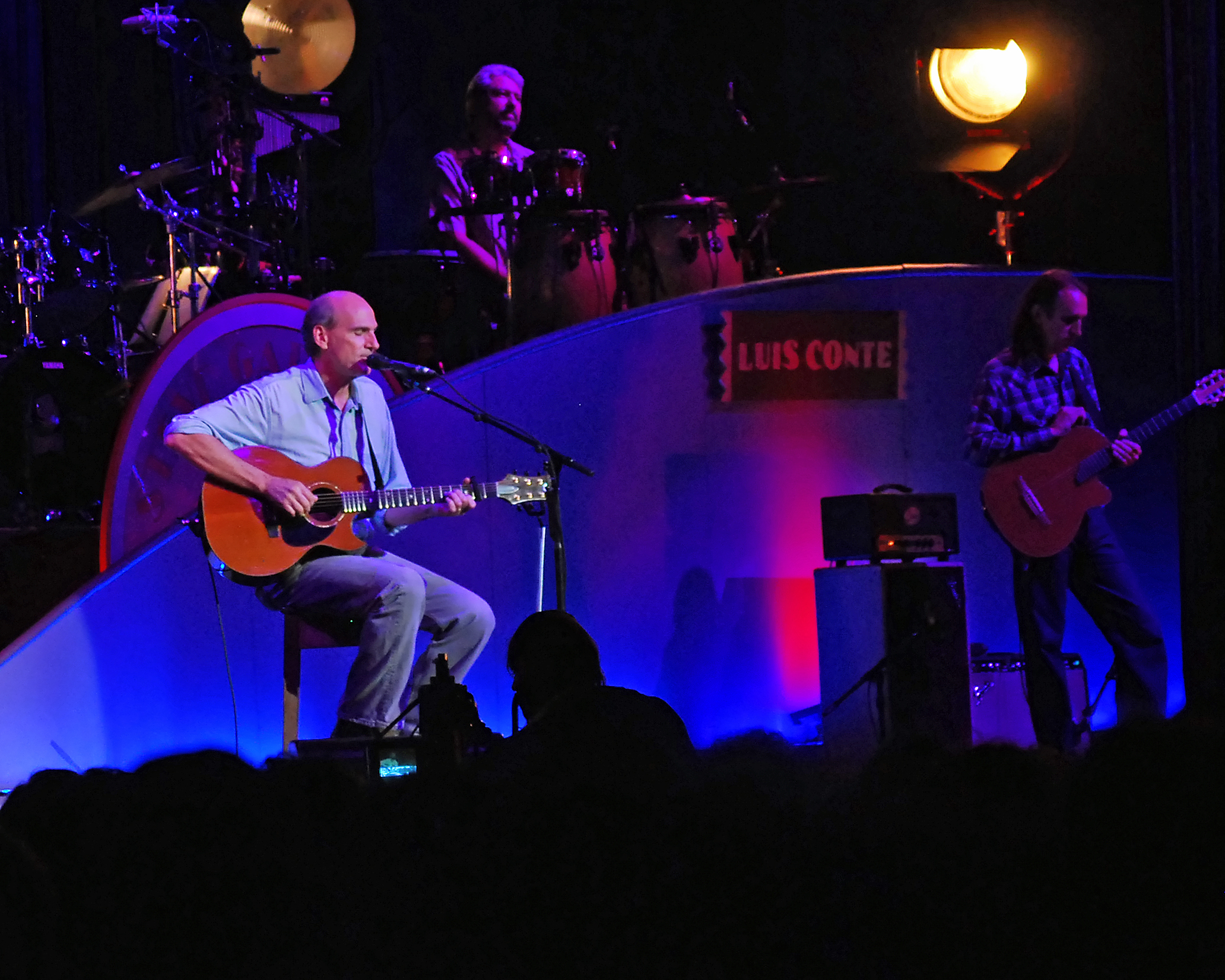
- James Taylor in concert in 2008.
- Studio albums: 20
- Extended plays: 1
- Live albums: 4
- Compilation albums: 7
- Tribute albums: 1
- Singles: 42
- Video albums: 7
- Music videos: 15
- No. 1 singles: 6
- Other charted songs: 4

The discography of James Taylor, an American singer-songwriter, consists of 20 studio albums, six compilation albums, at least five live albums, one tribute album, nine video albums, one extended play, and 42 singles.

Taylor signed his first recording contract with Apple Records, where he released his self-titled debut album in 1968. Prior to signing with Apple, Taylor released the single "Night Owl" with the group The Flying Machine. An album of their recordings, James Taylor and the Original Flying Machine was released in 1971 and reached No. 74 on the US pop charts. Taylor released his second studio album Sweet Baby James on Warner Bros. Records in 1970. Its lead single "Fire and Rain" became a significant international hit and gained Taylor his first major exposure as an artist. In April 1971, Taylor released his third studio album Mud Slide Slim and the Blue Horizon, which became his second album to certify multi-platinum in sales by the Recording Industry Association of America and featured his first number one single "You've Got a Friend". In 1972 and 1973, he released his fourth studio album, One Man Dog and his fifth, Walking Man; both peaked within the Top 20 on the Billboard 200 albums list.

After releasing more albums between 1974 and 1976, Taylor signed with Columbia Records and issued JT in 1977, which peaked in the Top 5 and sold over two million copies in the United States, certifying two times multi-platinum by the Recording Industry Association of America. In 1979 and 1981, Taylor released Flag and Dad Loves His Work, respectively, which both certified platinum in the United States and produced Top 40 singles. Nearly four years later, Taylor's next studio album That's Why I'm Here was released and spawned a cover of Buddy Holly's "Everyday", which became a minor hit in the United States. This was followed by Never Die Young three years later and then by New Moon Shine in 1991, both of which sold over one million copies. After recording a two-disc live album in 1993, Taylor returned in 1997 with a fourteenth studio album titled Hourglass. The album not only peaked at No. 9 on the Billboard 200, but also received a Grammy Award for Best Pop Album the following year. His fifteenth studio release October Road was issued on August 13, 2002, on Sony BMG and certified platinum by the Recording Industry Association of America. After recording a limited release holiday album in 2004, Taylor released his first major-release holiday album, James Taylor at Christmas on October 10, 2006.

One Man Band was released in 2007 and certified gold in the United States. This was followed by Taylor's first cover album in 2008 on the Hear Music label. There was also an extended play sequel, Other Covers in 2009. In 2015, Taylor released another live album, Georgia on My Mind: Live in Atlanta, 1981, and another studio album, Before This World, which became his first album to peak at No.1 in the United States.

== Studio albums ==
=== 1960s ===
Title	Album details	Peak positions	
Title	Album details	US	AUS
James Taylor	Release date: December 6, 1968; Label: Apple; Formats: LP, 8-track	62	12

=== 1970s ===
Title	Album details	Peak chart positions							Certifications (sales threshold)
Title	Album details	US	AUS	CAN	NOR	NLD	NZ	UK	Certifications (sales threshold)
Sweet Baby James	Release date: February 1970; Label: Warner Bros.; Formats: LP, 8-track	3	7	3	—	—	—	6	RIAA: 3× Platinum; BPI: Silver
Mud Slide Slim and the Blue Horizon	Release date: March 16, 1971; Label: Warner Bros.; Formats: LP, 8-track	2	12	4	17	—	—	4	RIAA: 2× Platinum
One Man Dog	Release date: November 1, 1972; Label: Warner Bros.; Formats: LP, 8-track	4	13	7	—	—	—	27	RIAA: Gold
Walking Man	Release date: June 1, 1974; Label: Warner Bros.; Formats: LP, 8-track	13	50	11	—	—	—	—	
Gorilla	Release date: May 1, 1975; Label: Warner Bros.; Formats: LP, 8-track	6	60	—	—	—	—	—	RIAA: Gold
In the Pocket	Release date: June 1976; Label: Warner Bros.; Formats: LP, 8-track	16	65	17	14	—	—	—	RIAA: Gold
JT	Release date: June 1977; Label: Columbia; Formats: LP, 8-track	4	10	2	—	—	31	—	RIAA: 3× Platinum; MC: Platinum
Flag	Release date: May 1979; Label: Columbia; Formats: LP, 8-track	10	18	9	17	17	50	—	RIAA: Platinum
"—" denotes releases that did not chart

=== 1980s ===
Title	Album details	Peak chart positions							Certifications (sales threshold)
Title	Album details	US	AUS	CAN	NOR	NLD	NZ	UK	Certifications (sales threshold)
Dad Loves His Work	Release date: March 1981; Label: Columbia; Formats: CD, LP, 8-track	10	23	40	20	20	29	—	RIAA: Platinum
That's Why I'm Here	Release date: October 1985; Label: Columbia; Formats: CD, LP, cassette	34	24	—	—	—	—	—	RIAA: Platinum
Never Die Young	Release date: January 1988; Label: Columbia; Formats: CD, LP, cassette	25	26	37	—	—	—	—	RIAA: Platinum
"—" denotes releases that did not chart

=== 1990s ===
Title	Album details	Peak chart positions						Certifications (sales threshold)
Title	Album details	US	AUS	CAN	NOR	NLD	UK	Certifications (sales threshold)
New Moon Shine	Release date: September 24, 1991; Label: Columbia; Formats: CD, LP, cassette	37	—	—	—	—	—	RIAA: Platinum
Hourglass	Release date: May 20, 1997; Label: Columbia; Formats: CD, LP, cassette, SACD	9	68	52	38	38	52	RIAA: Platinum; BPI: Silver
"—" denotes releases that did not chart

=== 2000s ===
Title	Album details	Peak chart positions						Certifications (sales threshold)
Title	Album details	US	AUS	CAN	NOR	NLD	UK	Certifications (sales threshold)
October Road	Release date: August 13, 2002; Label: Sony BMG; Formats: CD, LP	4	48	—	33	40	39	RIAA: Platinum
A Christmas Album	Release date: November 1, 2004; Label: Hallmark; Formats: CD, music download	122	—	—	—	—	—	RIAA: Platinum
A Christmas Album	Reissued as James Taylor at Christmas: October 10, 2006; Label: Columbia; Formats: CD, LP, music download	16	—	—	—	—	—	RIAA: Gold
Covers	Release date: September 30, 2008; Label: Hear Music; Formats: CD, LP, music download	4	—	21	—	85	23	BPI: Silver
"—" denotes releases that did not chart

=== 2010s–2020s ===
Title	Album details	Peak chart positions						Certifications (sales threshold)
Title	Album details	US	AUS	CAN	NOR	NLD	UK	Certifications (sales threshold)
Before This World	Release date: June 16, 2015; Label: Concord Music; Formats: CD, LP, music download	1	12	10	16	13	4	
American Standard	Release date: February 28, 2020; Label: Fantasy; Formats: CD, LP, music download	4	23	1	—	55	11	
"—" denotes releases that did not chart

== Live albums ==
Title	Album details	Peak chart positions		Certifications (sales threshold)
Title	Album details	US	CAN	Certifications (sales threshold)
Live	Release date: August 10, 1993; Label: Columbia Records; Formats: CD, LP, cassette	20	71	RIAA: 2× Platinum
Best Live	Release date: June 21, 1994; Label: Sony Music Entertainment; Formats: CD, cassette	—	—	
One Man Band	Release date: November 13, 2007; Label: Hear Music; Formats: CD, LP, music download	17	—	RIAA: Gold
Amchitka (with Joni Mitchell and Phil Ochs)	Release date: November 2009; Label: Greenpeace; Formats: CD, music download	—	—	
Live at the Troubadour (with Carole King)	Release date: May 4, 2010; Label: Concord Records; Formats: CD, music download	4	21	RIAA: Gold
"—" denotes releases that did not chart

== Compilation albums ==
Title	Album details	Peak chart positions				Certifications (sales threshold)
Title	Album details	US	AUS	CAN	UK	Certifications (sales threshold)
Greatest Hits	Release date: November 1, 1976; Label: Warner Bros.; Formats: LP, 8-track	15	67	27	—	RIAA: 11× Platinum; ARIA: 3× Platinum; BPI: Platinum
Classic Songs	Release date: April 1987; Label: Warner Bros.; Formats: LP, cassette	—	48	—	53	BPI: Silver
Greatest Hits Volume 2	Release date: November 7, 2000; Label: Columbia; Formats: CD, cassette	97	—	—	—	RIAA: Gold
The Best of James Taylor	Release date: April 8, 2003; Label: Warner Bros.; Formats: CD	11	54	—	4	RIAA: Platinum; ARIA: Platinum; BPI: Gold
The Essential James Taylor	Release date: October 29, 2013; Label: Columbia/Sony Music Legacy; Formats: CD, digital download	—	—	—	50	
The Warner Bros Albums 1970–1976	Release date: July 19, 2019; Label: Warner Bros./Rhino; Formats: CD, digital download	—	—	—	—	
"—" denotes releases that did not chart

== Extended plays ==
Title	Album details	Peak positions
Title	Album details	US
Other Covers	Release date: April 7, 2009; Label: Hear Music; Formats: CD, music download	122
Over the Rainbow: The American Standard EP	Release date: November 20, 2020; Label: Fantasy; Formats: CD, music download	—

== Singles ==
Year	Single	Peak chart positions									Certification	Album
Year	Single	US	US AC	US Country	AUS	CAN	CAN AC	NLD	NZ	UK	Certification	Album
1969	"Carolina in My Mind"	118	—	—	—	64	—	—	—	—		James Taylor
1969	"Knocking 'Round the Zoo"	—	—	—	—	—	—	—	—	—		James Taylor
1970	"Sweet Baby James"	—	—	—	—	—	—	—	—	—		Sweet Baby James
1970	"Fire and Rain"	3	7	—	6	2	—	18	—	42	BPI: Gold	Sweet Baby James
1970	"Carolina in My Mind" (re-release)	67	—	—	—	64	—	—	—	—		James Taylor
1971	"Country Road"	37	9	—	95	19	3	—	—	—		Sweet Baby James
1971	"You've Got a Friend"	1	1	—	25	2	12	14	—	4	RIAA: Gold; BPI: Silver	Mud Slide Slim and the Blue Horizon
1971	"Long Ago and Far Away"	31	4	—	—	12	—	—	—	—		Mud Slide Slim and the Blue Horizon
1972	"Don't Let Me Be Lonely Tonight"	14	3	—	—	18	7	—	—	—		One Man Dog
1973	"One Man Parade"	67	—	—	—	—	55	—	—	—		One Man Dog
1973	"Hymn"	—	—	—	—	—	—	—	—	—		One Man Dog
1974	"Let It All Fall Down"	—	—	—	—	—	—	—	—	—		Walking Man
1974	"Walking Man"	—	26	—	—	—	—	—	—	—		Walking Man
1975	"How Sweet It Is (to Be Loved by You)"	5	1	—	35	1	1	—	30	—		Gorilla
1975	"Mexico"	49	5	—	—	83	8	—	—	—		Gorilla
1976	"Shower the People"	22	1	—	—	54	1	—	—	—		In the Pocket
1976	"Everybody Has the Blues"	—	—	—	—	—	—	—	—	—		In the Pocket
1977	"Woman's Gotta Have It"	—	20	—	—	—	11	—	—	—		In the Pocket
1977	"Handy Man" / "Bartender's Blues"	4 —	1 —	— 88	13 —	1 —	4 —	— —	24 —	— —		JT
1977	"Your Smiling Face"	20	6	—	—	11	4	—	—	—		JT
1978	"Honey Don't Leave L.A."	61	—	—	—	63	—	—	—	—		JT
1979	"Up on the Roof"	28	7	—	70	36	—	—	—	—		Flag
1981	"Her Town Too" (with JD Souther)	11	5	—	54	19	5	—	29	—		Dad Loves His Work
1981	"Hard Times"	72	23	—	—	—	—	—	—	—		Dad Loves His Work
1981	"Summer's Here"	—	25	—	—	—	12	—	—	—		Dad Loves His Work
1985	"Everyday"^{[A]}	61	3	26	—	93	1	—	—	—		That's Why I'm Here
1986	"Only One"	—	6	80	62	—	3	—	—	—		That's Why I'm Here
1986	"That's Why I'm Here"	—	8	—	—	—	3	—	—	—		That's Why I'm Here
1988	"Never Die Young"	80	3	—	79	80	—	—	—	—		Never Die Young
1988	"Baby Boom Baby"	—	16	—	—	24	16	—	—	—		Never Die Young
1991	"Copperline"	—	13	—	—	43	10	—	—	—		New Moon Shine
1992	"(I've Got To) Stop Thinkin' 'Bout That"	—	28	—	—	71	19	—	—	—		New Moon Shine
1992	"Everybody Loves to Cha Cha Cha"	—	19	—	—	70	—	—	—	—		New Moon Shine
1992	"Like Everyone She Knows"	—	31	—	—	—	—	—	—	—		New Moon Shine
1997	"Little More Time with You"	—	3	—	—	68	13	—	—	—		Hourglass
2002	"On the 4th of July"	—	16	—	—	—	—	—	—	—		October Road
2002	"Whenever You're Ready"	—	21	—	—	—	—	—	—	—		October Road
2003	"September Grass"	—	25	—	—	—	—	—	—	—		October Road
2008	"It's Growing"	—	11	—	—	—	—	—	—	—		Covers
2015	"Today Today Today"	—	—	—	—	—	—	—	—	—		Before This World
2015	"Angels of Fenway"	—	—	—	—	—	—	—	—	—		Before This World
2015	"Montana"	—	—	—	—	—	—	—	—	—		Before This World
"—" denotes releases that did not chart

- A "Everyday" also peaked at No. 21 on the Canadian RPM Country Tracks chart.

=== Guest singles ===
Year	Single	Artist	Chart positions									Certification	Album
Year	Single	Artist	US	US AC	US Country	US Christian	AUS	CAN	CAN AC	CAN Country	UK	Certification	Album
1974	"Mockingbird"	Carly Simon	5	10	—	—	8	3	—	—	34	RIAA: Gold	Hotcakes
1978	"(What a) Wonderful World"	Art Garfunkel (with Paul Simon)	17	1	—	—	—	13	1	—	—		Watermark
1978	"Bartender's Blues" (re-recording)	George Jones	—	—	6	—	—	—	—	8	—		Bartender's Blues
1978	"Devoted to You"	Carly Simon	36	2	33	—	—	50	2	39	—		Boys in the Trees
1986	"Back in the High Life Again"	Steve Winwood	13	1	—	—	—	—	—	—	53		Back in the High Life
1994	"Crying in the Rain"	Art Garfunkel	—	—	—	—	—	61	25	—	—		Up 'til Now
2001	"Sailing to Philadelphia"	Mark Knopfler	—	—	—	—	—	—	—	—	—		Sailing to Philadelphia
2012	"Soul Companion"	Mary Chapin Carpenter	—	—	—	—	—	—	—	—	—		Ashes and Roses
2013	"Don't Try So Hard"	Amy Grant	—	—	—	24	—	—	—	—	—		How Mercy Looks from Here
2018	"Change"	Charlie Puth	—	—	—	—	—	—	—	—	—		Voicenotes
"—" denotes releases that did not chart

== Other charted songs ==
Year	Single	Peak positions		Album
Year	Single	US AC	US Rock	Album
1981	"Stand and Fight"	–	21	Dad Loves His Work
2001	"Have Yourself a Merry Little Christmas"	4	–	October Road
2004	"Santa Claus Is Coming to Town"	12	–	James Taylor: A Christmas Album
2004	"Deck the Halls"	5		James Taylor: A Christmas Album
2004	"Winter Wonderland"	8	–	James Taylor: A Christmas Album
2004	"—" denotes releases that did not chart			James Taylor: A Christmas Album

== Other appearances ==
Year	Song	Album
1980	"Jelly Man Kelly"	In Harmony
1988	"Second Star to the Right"	Stay Awake: Various Interpretations of Music from Vintage Disney Films
1991	"Getting to Know You"	For Our Children
1992	"It's Only a Paper Moon" and "I Didn't Know What Time It Was"	A League of Their Own: Music from the Motion Picture
2003	"How's the World Treating You" (with Alison Krauss)	Livin', Lovin', Losin': Songs of the Louvin Brothers
2006	"Our Town"	Cars: Original Soundtrack
2012	"Payday"	Quiet About It: A Tribute to Jesse Winchester
2022	"Coming Back to You"	Here It Is: A Tribute to Leonard Cohen

=== Guest and session appearances ===
Year	Album	Artist	Role
1970	Writer	Carole King	Acoustic guitar; backing vocals on "Goin' Back"
1971	Tapestry	Carole King	Acoustic guitar, backing vocals
1971	Music	Carole King	Acoustic guitar on "Some Kind of Wonderful", "Song of Long Ago" and "Too Much Rain", backing vocals refrain on "Some Kind of Wonderful"
1971	Blue	Joni Mitchell	Guitar on various tracks
1972	Harvest	Neil Young	Banjo and backing vocals on various tracks
1978	Kate Taylor	Kate Taylor	Guitar, horn, backing vocals, and arrangements on various tracks
1978	Bartender's Blues	George Jones	Backing vocals on "Bartender 's Blues"
1979	Restless Nights	Karla Bonoff	Backing vocals (with JD Souther) on "The Water is Wide"
1986	Back in the High Life	Steve Winwood	Backing vocals on "Back in the High Life Again"
1988	Life Is Good	Livingston Taylor	Duet partner on "City Lights"
1991	Marc Cohn	Marc Cohn	Vocals on "Perfect Love"
1992	Harvest Moon	Neil Young	Background vocals on various tracks
1994	Angelus	Milton Nascimento	Vocals on "Only a Dream in Rio"
1995	Faust	Randy Newman	Role of "Lord"
1996	Eat the Phikis	Elio e le Storie Tese	Vocals on "First Me, Second Me"
1999	The Prayer Cycle	Jonathan Elias	Vocals on "Grace"
1999	Brand New Day	Sting	Featured artist on "Fill Her Up"
2000	Sailing to Philadelphia	Mark Knopfler	Featured artist on "Sailing to Philadelphia"
2001	Nearness of You: The Ballad Book	Michael Brecker	Vocals on "Don't Let Me Be Lonely Tonight" and "The Nearness of you"
2006	Duets: An American Classic	Tony Bennett	Duet partner on "Put on a Happy Face"
2007	Shine	Joni Mitchell	Guitar on "Shine"
2008	Songs of Joy & Peace	Yo-Yo Ma	Featured artist on "Here Comes the Sun"
2010	The 25th Anniversary Rock & Roll Hall Of Fame Concerts	Crosby, Stills & Nash	Featured artist on "Love the One You're With"
2018	Voicenotes	Charlie Puth	Featured artist on "Change"
2018	Honey Don't Leave L.A.	Danny Kortchmar and Immediate Family	Guitar and backing vocals on "Machine Gun Kelly"

== Video albums ==
Year	Video details	Certifications (sales threshold)
1979	James Taylor: In Concert: Released: 1979; Label: Sony Music Distribution	
1986	James Taylor Live in Rio: Released: 1986; Label: Columbia	
1988	James Taylor in Concert in Boston: Released: 1988; Label: Sony	
1993	Squibnocket: Released: 1993; Label: Sony	
1998	Live at the Beacon Theatre: Released: October 7, 1998; Label: Columbia	RIAA: Platinum
2002	Pull Over: Released: November 19, 2002; Label: Sony	RIAA: Gold; ARIA: 2× Platinum
2006	A Musicares Person of the Year Tribute: Released: September 12, 2006; Label: Rhino	
2010	Live at the Troubadour: Released: May 4, 2010; Label: Hear Music	RIAA: 6× Platinum; ARIA: Gold

== Music videos ==
Year	Song	Director(s)
1981	"Her Town Too"	
1985	"Everyday"	Stuart Orme
1986	"Only a Dream in Rio"	
1986	"Only One"	
1988	"Baby Boom Baby"	
1988	"Never Die Young"	
1991	"(I've Got To) Stop Thinkin' 'Bout That"	
1991	"Shed a Little Light"	
1992	"Copperline"	
1994	"Secret of Life"	
1997	"A Little More Time"	
1997	"Enough to Be on Your Way"	David Mirkin
1997	"Johnny Has Gone for a Soldier" (with Mark O'Connor)	
2003	"How's the World Treating You" (with Alison Krauss)	Lawrence Draper
2015	"Angels of Fenway"	
