= Classic Songs =

Compilation album by James Taylor
- Released: 1987
- Genre: Soft rock, folk rock
- Length: 58:12
- Label: CBS/WEA

James Taylor chronology
That's Why I'm Here (1985)	Classic Songs (1987)	Never Die Young (1988)

Professional ratings
Review scores
Source	Rating
Allmusic.com	4.5/5 stars
Encyclopedia of Popular Music	5/5 stars

Classic Songs is the second compilation album by James Taylor. Only available in Europe it was, for a long time, the only compilation album to feature original versions of Taylor's classics. It spanned from his original work to his That's Why I'm Here album from 1985.

== Track listing ==
All tracks are written by James Taylor, except where noted.

Side one
No.	Title	Writer(s)	Original release	Length
1.	"Fire and Rain"		Sweet Baby James, 1970	3:25
2.	"Mexico"		Gorilla, 1975	3:00
3.	"How Sweet It Is (to Be Loved by You)"	Holland–Dozier–Holland	Gorilla	3:36
4.	"You've Got a Friend"	Carole King	Mud Slide Slim and the Blue Horizon, 1971	4:30
5.	"Carolina in My Mind"		Greatest Hits, 1976	4:00
6.	"Something in the Way She Moves"		Greatest Hits	3:09
7.	"Shower the People"		In the Pocket, 1976	4:32
8.	"Sweet Baby James"		Sweet Baby James	2:52
Total length:				29:04

Side two
No.	Title	Writer(s)	Original release	Length
1.	"That's Why I'm Here"		That's Why I'm Here, 1985	3:38
2.	"Everyday"	Buddy Holly; Norman Petty	That's Why I'm Here	3:12
3.	"Up on the Roof"	Gerry Goffin; King	Flag, 1979	4:20
4.	"Your Smiling Face"		JT, 1977	2:42
5.	"Her Town Too"	Taylor; JD Souther; Waddy Watchel	Dad Loves His Work, 1981	4:25
6.	"Handy Man"	Otis Blackwell; Jimmy Jones	JT	3:17
7.	"Don't Let Me Be Lonely Tonight"		One Man Dog, 1972	2:36
8.	"Only a Dream in Rio"		That's Why I'm Here	4:58
Total length:				29:08

== Charts ==
Chart performance for Classic Songs
Chart (1987–1989)	Peak position
Australian Albums (ARIA)	48
UK Albums (OCC)	53

== Certifications ==
Certifications for Classic Songs
Region	Certification	Certified units/sales
United Kingdom (BPI)	Silver	60,000^{*}
^{*} Sales figures based on certification alone.
