= I Was a Fool to Care =

1975 James Taylor song

Song by James Taylor

from the album Gorilla
- Released: 1975
- Recorded: 1975
- Genre: Soft rock
- Length: 3:19
- Label: Warner Bros. Records
- Songwriter: James Taylor
- Producers: Russ Titelman; Lenny Waronker

"I Was a Fool to Care" is a song written by James Taylor that was first released on his 1975 album Gorilla. It has been covered by artists such as Mac DeMarco.

== Music and lyrics ==
The music to "I Was a Fool to Care" contains soul music and R&B elements. The Allmusic critic Bill Janovitz feels that the arrangement sounds like it is influenced by Marvin Gaye, whose "How Sweet It Is (To Be Loved By You)" Taylor covered on Gorilla, but smoothed out by string instruments and electric piano. Janovitz considers the melody to be beautiful but finds the lack of urgency in the arrangement to be inappropriate for the regret expressed by the lyrics. The music critic Terry Jordan describes it as a "lovesick ballad", saying it reminded him of Taylor's earlier hit "Long Ago and Far Away".

A Taylor biographer, Mark Ribowsky, interprets the lyrics as a "loyalty oath" to his wife Carly Simon. Rolling Stone's critic claims that it "evolves from a typical guitar-plunking Taylor tune into a big, vibrant and convincing love song". Ultimate Classic Rock's critic Dave Lifton similarly considers the theme to be "domestic bliss". However, the Taylor biographer Timothy White interprets the lyrics quite differently, as being about a "romance that only depleted the bedevilled lover". The musicologist James Perone interprets the lyrics similarly, as being about a "broken relationship" in which the singer was "a fool to care"; since Taylor was presumably happily married to Simon at the time, he finds this theme to be in contrast with Taylor's reputation as an autobiographical, confessional artist. The first verse opens with a reference to Gaye's song "I Heard It Through the Grapevine":

"Had I listened to the grapevine
I might have had my doubts
But I did my level best
Just to block them out."

Janowitz notes that unlike the music, the lyrics contain some "jagged edges", such as:

"Imagining your face
It almost fills the empty space before me
I can see you eyes and almost hear your lovely lies"

in the bridge and

"I wish I was an old man
And love was through with me"

in one of the verses.

== Reception ==
Matthew Trammell, in The New Yorker, considered "I Was a Fool to Care" to be the best song on Gorilla. Scoppa wrote that it was "sure to sprout cover versions before long". Mike Daly and Paul Speelman similarly suggested that the song should become a standard, particularly praising the string arrangement, Taylor's voice and the beautiful way that the electric and acoustic guitars blend together. Steve Wosahla claimed it had "the catchiness of a single".

== Mac DeMarco version ==
Mac DeMarco released a cover version of "I Was a Fool to Care" recorded with the keyboard player Jon Lent direct to YouTube in 2016. By May 2017, it had received almost 1.5 million views. The DeMarco version gives the song some indie music elements, such as guitar notes that "twist upward at the end of each phrase". The video shows someone wearing a bondage hood walking around with a photograph of James Taylor (which is actually the fold-out lyric sheet to Sweet Baby James) and playing guitar. The end of the video has the protagonist watching a brief portion of the Simpsons episode "Deep Space Homer", in which Taylor had a cameo. The video is dedicated to Prince, who died on the day it was released.
