= Live at the Beacon Theatre (James Taylor video album) =

Video by James Taylor
- Released: October 7, 1998
- Recorded: May 30, 1998
- Genre: Folk rock
- Length: 109 mins
- Label: Columbia Music Video
- Director: Beth McCarthy
- Producer: Carol Donovan

Live at the Beacon Theatre is a DVD concert video of James Taylor and his band performing at the Beacon Theatre in New York City on May 30, 1998.

== Background ==
Columbia Music Video chose Taylor's live performance as its first program to be produced for the DVD format. American audio engineer and mixer Frank Filipetti captured the audio track on a high-resolution 24-bit digital tape, that created stereo and surround-sound mixes of the concert. Filipetti used Sony's new (at that time), 3348-HR multitrack recorder and a Capricorn digital console to record and mix the live music from the concert.

He told Billboard Magazine that "we figured that, since these recorders were just out and we had the capability to use them, if this was going to be really high-quality audio, we should start with 24-bit from scratch." Taylor, who was on the road touring, was unable to participate in the post-production phase of the project.

== Reception ==
Professional ratings
Review scores
Source	Rating
AllMusic	4.5/5 stars
Stereo Review's Sound & Vision	3.5/5 stars

Scott Podmore wrote in the Sunday Herald Sun that Taylor "almost sheepishly charms his diehard fans at this concert", and that his "softly spoken manner, ever-smiling face and 25 wonderfully performed tunes are supported by talented musicians and back-up vocalists." He highlights Taylor classics; Fire and Rain, You've got a Friend and Your Smiling Face, as "soul-soothing music that shines". He finished his review saying, "Taylor, the storyteller, is brilliant in a memorable show and classic DVD."

AllMusic said in their review that "the brilliantly clear Dolby Digital Surround Sound, and the interview with Taylor make it one of the best music DVDs available, and a must for fans."

American music critic Michael Fremer praised the DVD, writing: "this superbly recorded and produced disc brilliantly captures the evening's performance and delivers it whole to your home theater. A first-class production in every way, James Taylor Live at the Beacon Theater sets the standard for how music DVDs should be recorded and produced."

== Track listing ==
1. "You Can Close Your Eyes"
2. "Another Day"
3. "Daddy's All Gone"
4. "Everyday"
5. "Wasn't That a Mighty Storm"
6. "Only a Dream in Rio"
7. "Don't Let Me Be Lonely Tonight"
8. "Your Smiling Face"
9. "Jump Up Behind Me"
10. "Shower the People"
11. "How Sweet It Is (To Be Loved by You)"
12. "Fire and Rain"
13. "Me and My Guitar"
14. "(I've Got To) Stop Thinkin' 'Bout That"
15. "Handy Man"
16. "You've Got a Friend"
17. "Mexico"
18. "A Little More Time With You"
19. "Line 'Em Up"
20. "Up on the Roof"
21. "Ananas"
22. "Steamroller Blues"
23. "Belfast To Boston"
24. "Wandering"
25. "Not Fade Away"

== Personnel ==
- James Taylor - Vocals/Guitar/Harmonica
- Steve Jordan - Drums
- Luis Conte - Percussion
- Clifford Carter - Piano/Keyboards
- Bob Mann - Guitar
- Jimmy Johnson - Bass
- Arnold McCuller - Vocals
- David Lasley - Vocals
- Kate Markowitz - Vocals
- Valerie Carter - Vocals
- Owen Young - Cello
- Barry Danielian - Trumpet
- David Mann - Saxophone

== Bonus features ==
The DVD includes interview footage taken at the concert, biographies of Taylor and his band members, subtitles for the lyrics in English and French, and music videos for Copperline and Enough to Be on Your Way.
