= Live at the Beacon Theatre =

Live at the Beacon Theatre may refer to:

- Live at the Beacon Theatre (James Taylor video album)
- Live at the Beacon Theatre (The Allman Brothers Band video)
- Play All Night: Live at the Beacon Theatre 1992, an album by the Allman Brothers Band

== See also ==
- Live at the Beacon Theater, comedy special by Louis C.K.
