= Greatest Hits (James Taylor album) =

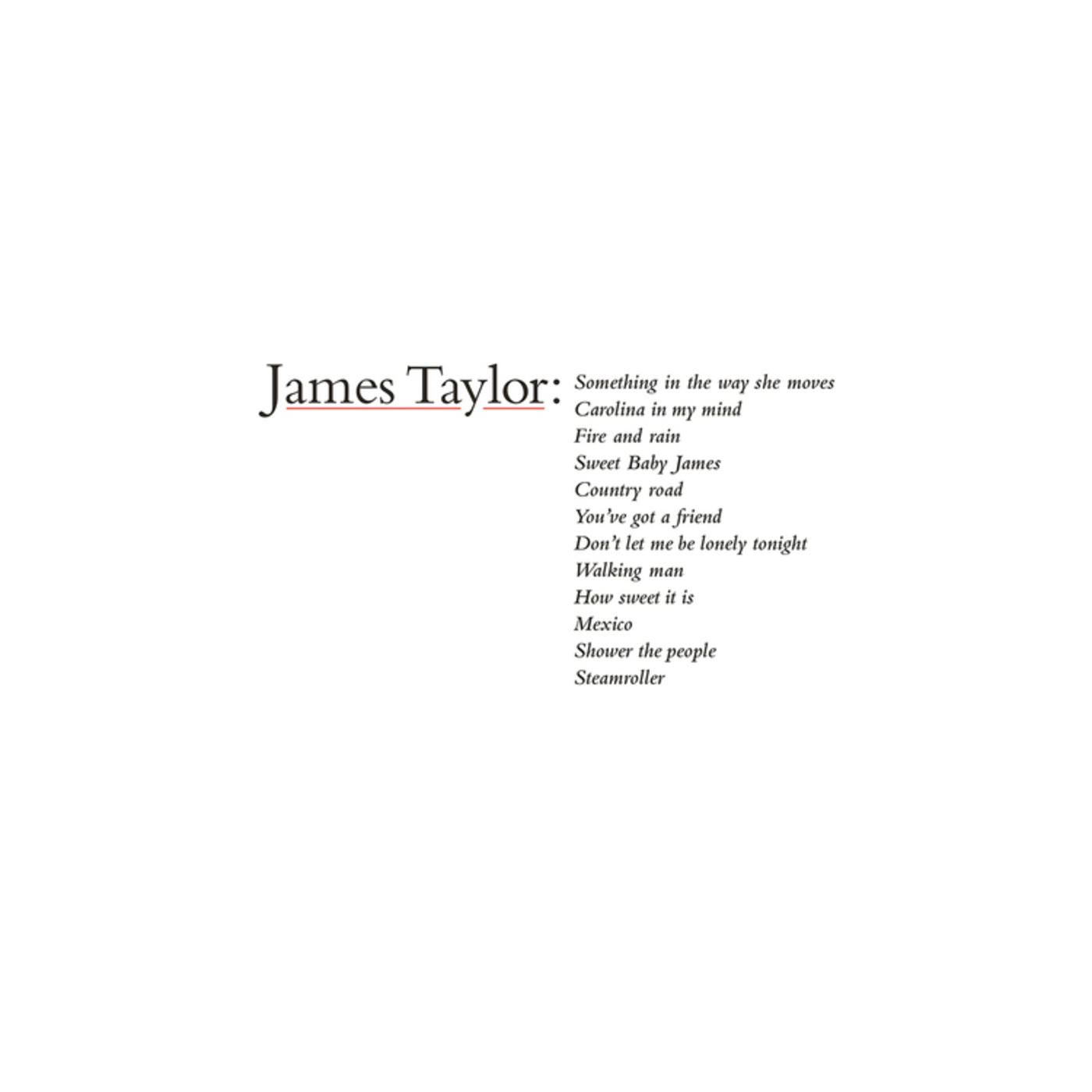

Greatest hits album by James Taylor
- Released: November 1976
- Recorded: December 1969 – October 1976
- Genres: Soft rock; folk pop
- Length: 43:42
- Label: Warner Bros.
- Producers: Peter Asher; David Spinozza; Lenny Waronker; Russ Titelman

James Taylor chronology
In the Pocket (1976)	Greatest Hits (1976)	JT (1977)

Singles from Greatest Hits
- 1. "Carolina in My Mind" Released: 1976; 2. "Steamroller Blues (live)" Released: 1975; 3. "Something in the Way She Moves" Released: 1976

Greatest Hits is the first greatest hits album by American singer-songwriter James Taylor, released in November 1976 by Warner Bros. Records. It remains Taylor's best-selling album, with over 11 million units being sold in the United States, making it among the best-selling albums of the 1970s.

The album took place in the context of Taylor's end of his recording contract with Warner Records. It features redone versions of "Carolina in My Mind" and "Something in the Way She Moves", both of which had been previously included on Taylor's self-titled debut album in 1968. It also includes a previously unavailable live version of "Steamroller" (This version would be the recording used on any other further retrospectives including the song).

The album did not rise higher than number 23 on the Billboard albums chart on its original release. However, it became a steady seller for many years, and Greatest Hits has sold over 11 million copies, certifying it as an 11× Platinum album.

In August 2012, the album re-entered the Billboard 200 albums chart, at number 15, which gave the album a new peak.

== Reception ==
Professional ratings
Review scores
Source	Rating
AllMusic	4.5/5 stars
Christgau's Record Guide	C
MusicHound Rock	3.5/5
The Rolling Stone Album Guide	4.5/5 stars

Music critic William Ruhlmann gave the album a positive review, writing for AllMusic that it constitutes a "reasonable collection for an artist who wasn't particularly well-defined by his singles". While cautioning that the release did not quite show the "evolution" of Taylor's songwriting, he stated that it remains "a good sampler" of the artist's early work.

== Track listing ==
All tracks are written by James Taylor, except where noted.

Side one
No.	Title	From	Length
1.	"Something in the Way She Moves" (1976 re-recording)	original version from James Taylor, 1969	3:13
2.	"Carolina in My Mind" (1976 re-recording)	original version from James Taylor	4:00
3.	"Fire and Rain"	Sweet Baby James, 1970	3:26
4.	"Sweet Baby James"	Sweet Baby James	2:55
5.	"Country Road"	Sweet Baby James	3:26
6.	"You've Got a Friend" (Carole King)	Mud Slide Slim and the Blue Horizon, 1971	4:33
Total length:			21:33

Side two
No.	Title	From	Length
1.	"Don't Let Me Be Lonely Tonight"	One Man Dog, 1972	2:39
2.	"Walking Man"	Walking Man, 1974	3:36
3.	"How Sweet It Is (To Be Loved By You)" (Holland-Dozier-Holland)	Gorilla, 1975	3:39
4.	"Mexico"	Gorilla	3:01
5.	"Shower the People"	In the Pocket, 1976	4:01
6.	"Steamroller" (live)	original version from Sweet Baby James	5:19
Total length:			22:15

== Personnel ==
- James Taylor – acoustic guitar, vocals
- Kenny Ascher – electric piano (track 8)
- Byron Berline – fiddle (track 2)
- Michael Brecker – tenor saxophone (track 7)
- David Crosby – harmony vocals (track 10)
- Nick DeCaro – hornorgan, voiceorgan (track 11)
- Craig Doerge – piano (track 7)
- Dan Dugmore – pedal steel guitar (tracks 1, 2)
- Victor Feldman – orchestra bells, vibes (track 11)
- Andrew Gold – harmonium, backing vocals (track 2)
- Milt Holland – percussion (track 10)
- Jim Keltner – drums (track 9)
- Carole King – piano (tracks 3–5)
- Danny Kortchmar – electric guitar (tracks 7, 9–10, 12); credited as Danny Kootch – acoustic guitar, congas (track 6)
- Russ Kunkel – drums (tracks 2–7, 10–12); congas (tracks 6–7); cabasa (track 6); tambourine (track 9); shaker (track 10)
- Gayle Levant – harp (track 10)
- John London – bass guitar (track 4)
- Rick Marotta – drums (track 8)
- Ralph MacDonald – percussion (track 8)
- Clarence McDonald – piano (tracks 2, 9, 12); Fender Rhodes piano (tracks 9, 11); voiceorgan (track 11)
- Randy Meisner – bass guitar (track 5)
- Joni Mitchell – backing vocals (track 6)
- Andy Muson – bass guitar (track 8)
- Graham Nash – harmony vocals (track 10)
- Gene Orloff – strings (concertmaster) (track 8)
- Herb Pedersen – backing vocals (track 1)
- Red Rhodes – pedal steel guitar (track 4)
- David Sanborn – saxophone (track 9)
- Carly Simon – harmony vocals (tracks 9, 11)
- Leland Sklar (credited as "Lee" Sklar) – bass guitar (tracks 1–2, 6–7, 9–12)
- David Spinozza – electric guitar; acoustic guitar (track 8)
- Bobby West (credited as Bobby "Wild Wild" West) – double bass (track 3)
- John Kosh Album cover designer

== Charts ==
=== Weekly charts ===
Weekly chart performance for Greatest Hits
Chart (1976–2020)	Peak position
Australian Albums (Kent Music Report)	67
Canada Top Albums/CDs (RPM)	27
US Billboard 200	15
US Top Rock Albums (Billboard)	31

=== Year-end charts ===
2020 year-end chart performance for Greatest Hits
Chart (2020)	Position
US Top Rock Albums (Billboard)	79

== Certifications ==
Certifications for Greatest Hits
Region	Certification	Certified units/sales
Australia (ARIA)	3× Platinum	210,000^{^}
Spain (Promusicae)	Gold	50,000^{^}
United Kingdom (BPI)	Platinum	300,000^{*}
United States (RIAA)	11× Platinum	11,000,000^{^}
^{*} Sales figures based on certification alone.^{^} Shipments figures based on certification alone.

== See also ==
- List of best-selling albums in the United States
