= Mexico (James Taylor song) =

Single by James Taylor

from the album Gorilla
- B-side: "Gorilla"
- Released: August 1975
- Genre: Folk rock, soft rock
- Length: 2:57
- Label: Warner Bros.
- Songwriter: James Taylor
- Producers: Russ Titelman, Lenny Waronker

James Taylor singles chronology
"How Sweet It Is (to Be Loved by You)" (1975)	"Mexico" (1975)	"Shower the People" (1976)

"Mexico" is a song written by James Taylor that first appeared as the opening track of his 1975 album Gorilla. It was released as a single, with the album's title track as the B-side, and reached No. 49 on the Billboard Hot 100, but performed much better on the Adult Contemporary chart, reaching No. 5. "Mexico" has appeared on many of Taylor's live and compilation albums. It has been covered by Jimmy Buffett, Alex de Grassi and Lauren Laverne.

== Lyrics and music ==
The lyrics of "Mexico" describe a dream of enjoying a night in a Mexican border town. It seems to describe the singer's first-hand experiences in Mexico but has a twist near the end where the singer acknowledges that he has never been to Mexico, turning the song into a "fantasy about escaping to an exotic land." It is one of several songs on Gorilla that uses a stream of consciousness technique to describe the singer's fantasy. Others include "Music" and "You Make It Easy." Ultimate Classic Rock critic Dave Lifton sees it as a reflection of the lighter tone Taylor brought to the Gorilla album compared to his earlier brooding lyrics.

"Mexico" is a happy song that contrasts Taylor's sad, sensitive image. "Mexico" has a medium tempo, a Latin music-influenced style and a "buoyant" rhythm. Its music incorporates features of country rock music. Musicologist James Perone points out that an unusual feature of the song is an abrupt key change from E major at the end of the verses to F-sharp major to begin the refrain, which Perone interprets as corresponding to the shift between describing how the singer imagines Mexico to be and his declaration that he needs to go there.

Graham Nash and David Crosby sing backup vocals. Critic Doug Pringle describes Nash's harmony vocals as "lovely."

== Reception ==
"Mexico" peaked at only #49 on the Billboard Hot 100 but achieved substantial radio play and reached #5 on Billboard's Adult Contemporary chart. Its performance in Canada was similar. It only reached #83 on the singles chart but made it to #8 on the Adult Contemporary chart.

Billboard described the song as an "easy, mid-tempo cut" with smooth vocals with the instrumentation dominated by percussion and steel drums. Cash Box called it "a bright change of pace in the form of a bubbling Latin beat dressed in la ropa de conga, vibraphone, and acoustic guitar." Rolling Stone Critic Bud Scoppa describes the song as "delightful." Music critic Robert Christgau rates "Mexico" and its B-side "Gorilla" as the two songs on Gorilla that he likes. Music critic Martin Smith regarded "Mexico" as his favorite song from Gorilla. Author Martin Charles Strong describes it as "demonstrating what Taylor was capable of when he decided to step up a gear." Rolling Stone Album Guide critic Mark Coleman appreciates the song's sense of humor. In 2003, AllMusic critic Thom Jurek wrote that the song hasn't aged, and that it still seems "as immediate and relevant in the 21st century as [it] did in the 1970s."

== Other appearances ==
"Mexico" has appeared on a number of James Taylor compilation albums. It was included on the 1976 album Greatest Hits. It later appeared on the 1990 album Classic Songs, the 2003 album The Best of James Taylor and the 2013 album The Essential James Taylor. Live versions of "Mexico" have been included on several live albums, including the 1991 album Live in Rio, all versions of the 1993 album Live and the 1998 album Live at the Beacon Theatre.

== Personnel ==
- James Taylor – lead vocals, acoustic guitar
- Danny Kortchmar – electric guitar
- Leland Sklar – bass
- David Crosby, Graham Nash – harmony vocals
- Russ Kunkel – drums, shaker
- Milt Holland – percussion
- Gayle Levant – harp

== Covers ==
Jimmy Buffett covered "Mexico" on his 1995 album Barometer Soup. Allmusic critic William Ruhlmann regarded the cover as appropriate, since the song was "consistent with Buffett's philosophy." Alex de Grassi covered "Mexico" on his 1999 album Alex de Grassi's Interpretation of James Taylor. Lauren Laverne covered the song on a BBC Radio 1 Evening Session in August 2000. The John Tesh Project released an instrumental version of the song on the 1997 album Sax All Night.

Bill Wurtz covered the song on his website under the jazz page in 2014.
