= Walking Man =

Studio album by James Taylor
- Released: June 1974
- Recorded: January – April 1974
- Studios: Hit Factory, New York City
- Genres: Soft rock; folk
- Length: 33:34
- Label: Warner Bros.
- Producer: David Spinozza

James Taylor chronology
One Man Dog (1972)	Walking Man (1974)	Gorilla (1975)

Singles from Walking Man
- 1. "Let It All Fall Down" Released: August 2, 1974; 2. "Ain't No Song" Released: August 2, 1974 (UK); 3. "Walking Man" Released: September 1974

Walking Man is the fifth studio album by singer-songwriter James Taylor. Released in June 1974, it was not as successful as his previous efforts, reaching only No. 13 on the Billboard Album Chart and selling 300,000 copies in the United States. Until 2008's Covers, it was Taylor's only studio album not to receive a gold or platinum certification from the RIAA.

The title track reached number 26 on the Easy Listening chart in October 1974.

Record World called the title track a "tall, proud mansong" that could be Taylor's biggest hit since "Fire and Rain."

Cash Box said of the single "Let It All Fall Down" that it's a "tender, highly lyrical tune, very reminiscent of the artist's powerful beginning.." Record World called it a "nihilistic hymn of anarchy [that] gets the hauntingly up musical treatment."

"Hello Old Friend" was used in the intro for ABC's Game 3 coverage of the 1989 World Series, just before the pre-game broadcast was interrupted by a 6.9 magnitude earthquake.

Professional ratings
Review scores
Source	Rating
AllMusic	2.5/5 stars
Encyclopedia of Popular Music	3/5 stars
MusicHound	2/5
Rolling Stone	(not rated)
The Rolling Stone Album Guide	2/5 stars

== Track listing ==
All tracks are written by James Taylor except where noted.

Side one

1. "Walking Man" – 3:30
2. "Rock 'n' Roll Is Music Now" – 3:25
3. "Let It All Fall Down" – 3:30
4. "Me and My Guitar" – 3:30
5. "Daddy's Baby" – 2:37

Side two

1. "Ain't No Song" (Joey Levine, David Spinozza) – 3:28
2. "Hello Old Friend" – 2:45
3. "Migration" – 3:14
4. "The Promised Land" (Chuck Berry) – 4:03
5. "Fading Away" – 3:32

== Personnel ==
- James Taylor – lead vocals, backing vocals (1–4, 6), acoustic guitar (1–8, 10), arrangements
- David Spinozza – electric guitar (1, 4, 6, 7, 9, 10), acoustic electric guitar (1), electric piano (2), acoustic guitar (4), organ (8), arrangements
- Hugh McCracken – electric guitar (2, 3, 6, 9, 10), harmonica (4), acoustic guitar (8)
- Kenny Ascher – electric piano (1, 3, 6), acoustic piano (2, 7, 8, 10), organ (9)
- Don Grolnick – acoustic piano (4, 9), organ (4, 10), Vox humana (5, 8)
- Ralph Schuckett – clavinet (6), electric piano (7)
- Andy Muson – bass guitar (1–4, 6–10)
- Rick Marotta – drums (1–4, 6–10), backing vocals (2)
- Ralph MacDonald – percussion (1, 3, 4, 6, 8)
- Gene Orloff – strings (1, 4, 7), concertmaster (1, 4, 7)
- George Young – alto saxophone (2, 6, 7, 9)
- Kenny Berger – baritone saxophone (2, 6, 9)
- Michael Brecker – tenor saxophone (2, 6, 9)
- Barry Rogers – trombone (2, 6, 9)
- Randy Brecker – trumpet (2, 7)
- Alan Rubin – trumpet (2, 4, 6, 7, 9)
- Howard Johnson – tuba (2, 6, 9)
- Peter Gordon – French horn (4, 7)
- George Marge – oboe (4, 7)
- Linda McCartney – backing vocals (2, 3)
- Paul McCartney – backing vocals (2, 3)
- Carly Simon – backing vocals (2–6)
- Peter Asher – backing vocals (4, 6)

=== Production ===
- Producer – David Spinozza
- Engineered and Mixed by Harry Maslin
- Assistant Engineers – Blaise Castellano and David Henson
- Design – Rod Dyer
- Photography – Richard Avedon

== Charts ==
Chart (1974)	Peak position
Australia (Kent Music Report)	50
Canada Top Albums/CDs (RPM)	11
US Billboard 200	13
