= In the Pocket (James Taylor album) =

Studio album by James Taylor
- Released: June 1976
- Recorded: 1975–76
- Studios: Warner Bros. Recording Studios (North Hollywood); The Burbank Studios (Burbank)
- Genres: Soft rock; R&B
- Length: 45:04
- Labels: Warner Bros, Rhino, Flashback
- Producers: Russ Titelman, Lenny Waronker

James Taylor chronology
Gorilla (1975)	In the Pocket (1976)	Greatest Hits (1976)

Singles from In the Pocket
- 1. "Shower the People" Released: June 1976; 2. "Everybody Has the Blues" Released: August 1976 (UK); 3. "Woman's Gotta Have It" Released: October 1976

In the Pocket is the seventh studio album by American singer-songwriter James Taylor and his last to be released under Warner Bros. Records before signing with Columbia. Released in June 1976, the album found Taylor recording in the studio with many colleagues and friends, mainly Art Garfunkel (who duetted with him on "A Junkie's Lament" and also contributed vocals on "Captain Jim's Drunken Dream"), Carly Simon (Taylor's wife, who harmonised with him on "Shower the People"), Stevie Wonder (who wrote with Taylor the song "Don't Be Sad 'Cause Your Sun Is Down", a song on which he also played the harmonica) and David Crosby, Linda Ronstadt, and Bonnie Raitt, among others.

The result of the sessions, which took place between late 1975 and early '76, was a very melodic album and one of his most diverse and polished, highlighted with the single "Shower the People", which through the years became a Taylor standard and concert favorite. Released as a single, the track peaked at #22 on the Billboard charts on September 18, 1976, and reached the summit of the Adult Contemporary charts in the US. Despite its success, In the Pocket didn't match the success of Taylor's previous album Gorilla, reaching only #16 on the Billboard album charts (it was Taylor's lowest chart position during the 1970s and also the lowest since his debut album). Nevertheless, it managed to eventually get a Gold certification by the RIAA and became a fan favorite.

In 2008, the album was reissued on Rhino's budget Flashback label.

Professional ratings
Review scores
Source	Rating
AllMusic	3/5 stars
Encyclopedia of Popular Music	2/5 stars
MusicHound	2/5
Rolling Stone	(highly unfavorable)
The Rolling Stone Album Guide	2/5 stars

== Track listing ==
All songs by James Taylor unless otherwise noted.

Side one

1. "Shower the People" – 4:32
2. "A Junkie's Lament" – 3:27
3. "Money Machine" – 4:35
4. "Slow Burning Love" – 3:43
5. "Everybody Has the Blues" – 2:01
6. "Daddy's All Gone" – 3:38

Side two

1. "Woman's Gotta Have It" (Bobby Womack, Darryl Carter, Linda Cooke Womack) – 4:20
2. "Captain Jim's Drunken Dream" – 4:00
3. "Don't Be Sad 'Cause Your Sun Is Down" (Taylor, Stevie Wonder) – 3:28
4. "Nothing Like a Hundred Miles" – 3:35
5. "Family Man" – 3:34
6. "Golden Moments" – 3:35

== Personnel ==
- James Taylor – lead vocals, harmony vocals (1, 3, 8, 10), acoustic guitar, horn arrangements (3, 11), bass harmonica (4), backing vocals (4)
- Malcolm Cecil – Moog synthesizer programming
- Clarence McDonald – Fender Rhodes (1, 2, 4, 6, 7), hornorgan (1), Moog synthesizer (2), acoustic piano (3, 8, 9), Hammond organ (11)
- Nick DeCaro – voiceorgan (1, 3, 12), hornorgan (1–3, 12), accordion (4, 8), ARP String Ensemble (4), string arrangements and conductor
- Craig Doerge – keyboards (5)
- Danny Kortchmar – electric guitar (3, 4, 6–8, 11), mandolin (4), acoustic guitar (7)
- Waddy Wachtel – electric guitar (7, 10)
- David Grisman – mandolin (8), mandocello (8)
- Herb Pedersen – banjo (9)
- David Lindley – dobro (10)
- Leland Sklar – bass guitar (1–3, 6–12)
- Willie Weeks – bass guitar (4)
- Red Callender – double bass (5), tuba (5)
- Russ Kunkel – drums (1–4, 6–11), percussion (1, 2, 4, 6, 7, 9)
- Jim Keltner – drums (5)
- Victor Feldman – orchestra bells (1), vibraphone (1), percussion (3), marimba (8), bass marimba (8), cymbals (8), wind chimes (8)
- Milt Holland – chimes (2, 8), wind chimes (2)
- Kenny Watson – cimbalom (4)
- Peter Asher – tambourine (7)
- Russ Titelman – tambourine (9)
- Bobbye Hall – congas (11), shaker (11), triangle (12)
- Gayle Levant – harp (2, 12)
- Michael Brecker – saxophone (3, 11)
- Ernie Watts – saxophones (5)
- George Bohanon – trombone (5), horn arrangements (5)
- Steve Madaio – trumpet (3, 11)
- Oscar Brashear – trumpet (5)
- Stevie Wonder – harmonica (9)
- Carly Simon – harmony vocals (1, 2, 11), backing vocals (4)
- Art Garfunkel – lead vocals (2), harmony vocals (8)
- Valerie Carter – harmony vocals (3, 11)
- David Crosby – harmony vocals (10)
- Graham Nash – harmony vocals (10)
- Bonnie Raitt – harmony vocals (11)
- Alex Taylor – harmony vocals (11)

== Production ==
- Producers – Russ Titelman and Lenny Waronker
- Production Assistant – Trudy Portch
- Recorded, Mixed and Mastered by Lee Herschberg at Warner Bros. Recording Studios (Hollywood, CA).
- Assistant Engineer – Loyd Clifft
- Personal Management – Peter Asher
- Art Direction and Cover Design – Mike Salisbury
- Photography – Norman Seeff

== Charts ==
Chart (1976)	Peak position
Australia (Kent Music Report)	65
Canada Top Albums/CDs (RPM)	17
Norwegian Albums (VG-lista)	14
US Billboard 200	16
