= Don't Let Me Be Lonely Tonight =

Single by James Taylor

from the album One Man Dog
- B-side: "Woh, Don't You Know"
- Released: November 1972
- Genre: Folk rock
- Length: 2:34
- Label: Warner Bros.
- Songwriter: James Taylor
- Producer: Peter Asher

James Taylor singles chronology
"Long Ago and Far Away" (1971)	"Don't Let Me Be Lonely Tonight" (1972)	"One Man Parade" (1973)

"Don't Let Me Be Lonely Tonight" is a song written and performed by American singer-songwriter James Taylor, from his 1972 album One Man Dog. The song has been included on three of Taylor's greatest-hits collection albums: Greatest Hits (1976), Classic Songs (1987) and The Best of James Taylor (2003). Taylor re-recorded the song for the 2001 Michael Brecker album Nearness of You: The Ballad Book; this rendition won Taylor the Grammy Award for Best Male Pop Vocal Performance in 2002.

== Reception ==
Billboard described "Don't Let Me Be Lonely Tonight" as a "ballad beauty." Record World called it a "superb lilting ballad featuring stunning Peter Asher production work and a terrific saxophone finale." AllMusic reviewer Bill Janovitz wrote that the song is "a stunning example of the Tin Pan Alley-type of jazzy romantic ballad", and that the song's lyrics, about "a betrayed lover who allows his lonely heart to control his head", were unusual in that songs on that theme were usually performed by female artists. Berwyn Life critic Steve Sparacio said that it "is simply one of the most beautiful ballads in existence."

== Personnel ==
- James Taylor – lead vocals, acoustic guitar
- Danny Kortchmar – electric guitar
- Craig Doerge – piano
- Lee Sklar – bass guitar
- Russ Kunkel – drums, congas
- Michael Brecker – tenor saxophone

== Charts ==
Chart (1972–1973)	Peak position
Canada Top Singles (RPM)	18
Canada Adult Contemporary (RPM)	7
US Billboard Hot 100	14
US Adult Contemporary (Billboard)	3
