= Gorilla (James Taylor album) =

Studio album by James Taylor
- Released: April 30, 1975
- Recorded: March 17 – April 24, 1975
- Studios: Warner Bros. Studios (North Hollywood); The Burbank Studios (Burbank)
- Genres: Soft rock; folk rock
- Length: 38:46
- Label: Warner Bros.
- Producers: Russ Titelman; Lenny Waronker

James Taylor chronology
Walking Man (1974)	Gorilla (1975)	In the Pocket (1976)

Singles from Gorilla
- 1. "How Sweet It Is (To Be Loved By You)" Released: June 1975; 2. "Mexico" Released: September 1975

Gorilla is the sixth studio album by American singer-songwriter James Taylor. Released in April 1975, it was more successful than Walking Man, his previous release. Two album tracks released as singles, "Mexico" and "How Sweet It Is (To Be Loved By You)", rose to the top five on the Billboard charts. This would be Taylor's second-to-last album of new material for Warner Bros. Records, his last being In the Pocket. In many ways, Gorilla showcased Taylor's electric, lighter side that became evident on Walking Man. The song "Sarah Maria" is about his daughter Sally (born Sarah Maria Taylor on January 7, 1974). His then-wife Carly Simon was featured on "How Sweet It Is (To Be Loved By You)", originally recorded by Marvin Gaye. Both "Mexico" and "Lighthouse" feature signature harmony background vocals by David Crosby and Graham Nash. Jimmy Buffett recorded "Mexico" on his 1995 album Barometer Soup and performed "Lighthouse" during his Salty Piece of Land tour of 2005.

Professional ratings
Review scores
Source	Rating
AllMusic	3.5/5 stars
Encyclopedia of Popular Music	3/5 stars
Rolling Stone	(not rated)
Christgau's Record Guide	C+
MusicHound	3.5/5
The Rolling Stone Album Guide	3.5/5 stars

== Track listing ==
All songs by James Taylor unless otherwise noted.

Side one

1. "Mexico" – 2:57
2. "Music" – 3:46
3. "How Sweet It Is (To Be Loved by You)" (Holland-Dozier-Holland) – 3:33
4. "Wandering" (Traditional; arrangement and additional lyrics: James Taylor) – 2:40
5. "Gorilla" – 3:10
6. "You Make It Easy" – 4:10

Side two

1. ”I Was a Fool to Care" – 3:19
2. "Lighthouse" – 3:15
3. "Angry Blues" – 3:25
4. "Love Songs" – 5:45
5. "Sarah Maria" – 2:46

== Personnel ==
- James Taylor – lead vocals, acoustic guitar (1, 2, 4, 5, 7–11), electric guitar (1), harmony vocals (2, 4, 5, 10, 11), arrangements (4), ukulele (5), high-string acoustic guitar (10)
- Clarence McDonald – Fender Rhodes (2, 3, 6, 7), acoustic piano (3, 6)
- Nick DeCaro – accordion (4, 7, 11), string arrangements
- Randy Newman – hornorgan (8)
- Danny Kortchmar – electric guitar (1, 3, 6)
- Al Perkins – pedal steel guitar (2, 10)
- David Grisman – mandolin (5, 11)
- Arthur Adams – electric guitar (7)
- Lowell George – electric guitar (9), harmony vocals (9)
- Leland Sklar – bass guitar (1, 3, 7, 8, 11)
- Willie Weeks – bass guitar (2, 5, 6, 9)
- Russ Kunkel – drums (1, 3, 7, 8, 10), shaker (1), tambourine (3), percussion (7), congas (10)
- Andy Newmark – drums (2, 5, 6, 9)
- Jim Keltner – drums (3)
- Milt Holland – percussion (1, 2, 9), wind chimes (10)
- Victor Feldman – percussion (9, 10), marimba (11)
- Gayle Levant – harp (1, 2, 10)
- David Sanborn – saxophone (3, 6)
- Jules Jacob – clarinet (5, 10), oboe (10)
- George Bohanon – trombone (7)
- Chuck Findley – trumpet (7)
- David Crosby – harmony vocals (1, 8)
- Graham Nash – harmony vocals (1, 8)
- Carly Simon – harmony vocals (3)
- Valerie Carter – harmony vocals (9)

== Production ==
- Producers – Russ Titelman and Lenny Waronker
- Engineered, Mixed and Mastered by Lee Herschberg
- Additional Engineer – Donn Landee
- Assistant Engineer – Lloyd Clifft
- Recorded at The Burbank Studios (Burbank, CA).
- Mixed and Mastered at Warner Bros. Recording Studios (Hollywood, CA).
- Cover and Design – Mike Salisbury
- Photography – Norman Seeff
- Art Direction - Ed Thrasher

== Charts ==
=== Weekly charts ===
Chart (1975)	Peak position
Australia (Kent Music Report)	60
Canada Top Albums/CDs (RPM)	2
US Billboard 200	6

=== Year-end charts ===
Chart (1975)	Position
Canada Top Albums/CDs (RPM)	23
US Billboard 200	53
