= Shower the People =

Single by James Taylor

from the album In the Pocket
- B-side: "I Can Dream of You"
- Released: June 1976
- Genre: Soft rock, folk rock, pop rock
- Length: 4:32
- Label: Warner Bros. Records
- Songwriter: James Taylor
- Producers: Russ Titelman & Lenny Waronker

James Taylor singles chronology
"Mexico" (1975)	"Shower the People" (1976)	"Everybody Has the Blues" (1976)

Official audio
- "Shower the People" on YouTube

"Shower the People" is the opening track on James Taylor's 1976 album In the Pocket.

== Reception ==
Cash Box said that the song is "a meaningful ballad that will pick up a lot of FM airplay" and said that it has "a way with melody and phrasing" similar to other Taylor songs. Record World said that "This midtempo offering is bolstered by a great singalong chorus."

== Personnel ==
- James Taylor – lead vocals, harmony vocals, acoustic guitars
- Carly Simon – harmony vocals
- Danny Kortchmar – electric guitars
- Leland Sklar – bass guitar
- Russ Kunkel – drums, percussion
- Victor Feldman – orchestral bells, vibes
- Clarence McDonald – Fender Rhodes, hornorgan
- Nick DeCaro – hornorgan, voiceorgan

== Chart performance ==
"Shower the People" reached No. 22 on the Billboard Hot 100 chart in the U.S. that fall, remaining in the Top 40 for eight weeks. It also topped the Easy Listening chart for one week, Taylor's third song to do so, following 1971's "You've Got a Friend" and 1975's "How Sweet It Is (To Be Loved by You)".

In Canada, the song fell short of the Pop Top 40; however, it did reach number one on the Adult Contemporary chart.

== See also ==
- List of number-one adult contemporary singles of 1976 (U.S.)
