= James Taylor =

American musician (born 1948)

- Taylor at the 2026 Montreux Jazz Festival
- Born: James Vernon Taylor; March 12, 1948 (age 78); Boston, Massachusetts, U.S.
- Occupations: Singer-songwriter; guitarist
- Years active: 1966–present
- Spouses: Carly Simon (m. 1972; div. 1983) Kathryn Walker (m. 1985; div. 1995) Caroline Smedvig (m. 2001)
- Children: 4, including Sally Taylor
- Father: Isaac M. Taylor
- Relatives: Alex Taylor (brother); Kate Taylor (sister); Livingston Taylor (brother)
- Musical career
- Origin: Chapel Hill, North Carolina, U.S.
- Genres: Folk rock; soft rock; folk
- Instruments: Vocals; guitar; harmonica
- Works: James Taylor discography
- Labels: Apple; Capitol; EMI; Warner Bros.; Columbia; Sony; Hear; Fantasy
- Formerly of: The Flying Machine
- Website: jamestaylor.com

James Vernon Taylor (born March 12, 1948) is an American singer-songwriter and guitarist. After breaking through with the No. 3 hit "Fire and Rain", Taylor had his first No. 1 hit in 1971 with his recording of "You've Got a Friend", written by Carole King. Taylor's 1976 Greatest Hits album was certified Diamond and has sold 11 million copies in the US alone, making it one of the best-selling albums in US history.

Following his 1977 album JT, every album that Taylor has released from 1977 to 2007 has sold over 1 million copies; his combined album and single sales in the US is certified at 33 million. Taylor enjoyed a resurgence in chart performance during the late 1990s and 2000s, when he recorded some of his most-awarded work including Hourglass, October Road, and Covers. Taylor achieved his first number-one album in the US in 2015 with Before This World.

He is known for his cover versions, such as "How Sweet It Is (To Be Loved by You)" and "Handy Man", as well as originals such as "Sweet Baby James". He played the leading role in Monte Hellman's 1971 film Two-Lane Blacktop. A six-time Grammy Award winner, Taylor was inducted into the Rock and Roll Hall of Fame in 2000. As of 2026, Taylor continues to actively tour.

== Early years ==
James Vernon Taylor was born at Massachusetts General Hospital in Boston on March 12, 1948. His father, Isaac M. Taylor, worked as a resident physician at the hospital and came from a wealthy Southern family. Taylor is of English and Scottish descent from the Taylor family of the Montrose area, with the former being rooted in Massachusetts Bay Colony; his ancestors include Edmund Rice, an English colonist who co-founded Sudbury, Massachusetts. His mother, Gertrude (née Woodard; 1921–2015), studied singing with Marie Sundelius at the New England Conservatory of Music and was an aspiring opera singer before she married Isaac in 1946. Taylor is the younger brother of musician Alex Taylor (1947–1993) and the older brother of musicians Kate Taylor (born 1949) and Livingston Taylor (born 1950). His youngest sibling, a brother named Hugh (born 1952), was also a musician; Hugh eventually left the music industry and has operated The Outermost Inn, a bed-and-breakfast in Aquinnah, Massachusetts, with his wife since 1989.

In 1951, Taylor and his family moved to Chapel Hill, North Carolina, when Isaac took a job as an assistant professor of medicine at the University of North Carolina School of Medicine. They built a house in the Morgan Creek area off the present Morgan Creek Road, which was sparsely populated. Taylor later said, "Chapel Hill, the Piedmont, the outlying hills, were tranquil, rural, beautiful, but quiet. Thinking of the red soil, caused by local copper mining, plus the seasons, the way things smelled down there, I feel as though my experience of coming of age there was more a matter of landscape and climate than people." James attended a public primary school in Chapel Hill. Isaac's career prospered, but he was frequently away from home on military service at Bethesda Naval Hospital in Maryland or as part of Operation Deep Freeze in Antarctica in 1955 and 1956. Isaac Taylor later rose to become dean of the UNC School of Medicine from 1964 to 1971. Beginning in 1953, the Taylors spent summers on Martha's Vineyard.

Taylor took cello lessons as a child in North Carolina, before learning the guitar in 1960. His guitar style evolved, influenced by hymns, carols, and the music of Woody Guthrie, and his technique derived from his bass clef-oriented cello training and from experimenting on his sister Kate's keyboards: "My style was a finger-picking style that was meant to be like a piano, as if my thumb were my left hand, and my first, second, and third fingers were my right hand." Spending summer holidays with his family on Martha's Vineyard, he met Danny Kortchmar, an aspiring teenage guitarist from Larchmont, New York. The two began listening to and playing blues and folk music together, and Kortchmar felt that Taylor's singing had a "natural sense of phrasing, every syllable beautifully in time. I knew James had that thing." Taylor wrote his first song on guitar at 14, and he continued to learn the instrument effortlessly. By the summer of 1963, he and Kortchmar were playing coffeehouses around the Vineyard, billed as "Jamie & Kootch".

In 1961, Taylor went to Milton Academy, a preparatory boarding school in Massachusetts. He faltered during his junior year, feeling uneasy in the high-pressure college prep environment despite having a good scholastic performance. The Milton headmaster later said, "James was more sensitive and less goal-oriented than most students of his day." He returned home to North Carolina to finish out the semester at Chapel Hill High School. There he joined a band formed by his brother Alex called The Corsayers (later The Fabulous Corsairs), playing electric guitar; in 1964, they cut a single in Raleigh that featured James's song "Cha Cha Blues" on the B-side. Having lost touch with his former school friends in North Carolina, Taylor returned to Milton for his senior year, where he started applying to colleges to complete his education. But he felt part of a "life that [he was] unable to lead", and he became depressed; he slept 20 hours each day, and his grades collapsed. In late 1965 he committed himself to McLean, a psychiatric hospital in Belmont, Massachusetts, where he was treated with chlorpromazine, and where the organized days began to give him a sense of time and structure. As the Vietnam War escalated, Taylor received a psychological rejection from the Selective Service System, when he appeared before them, uncommunicative, with two white-suited McLean assistants. Taylor earned a high school diploma in 1966 from the hospital's associated Arlington School. He later viewed his nine-month stay at McLean as "a lifesaver... like a pardon or like a reprieve", and both his brother Livingston and his sister Kate later were patients and students there as well. As for his mental health struggles, Taylor thought of them as innate and said: "It's an inseparable part of my personality that I have these feelings."

== Career ==
=== 1966–1969: Early career ===
At Kortchmar's urging, Taylor checked himself out of McLean and attended Elon University for a semester before he moved to New York City to form a band. They recruited Joel O'Brien, formerly of Kortchmar's old band King Bees to play drums, and Taylor's childhood friend Zachary Wiesner (son of academic Jerome Wiesner) to play bass. After Taylor rejected the notion of naming the group after him, they called themselves the Flying Machine. They played songs that Taylor had written at and about McLean, such as "Knocking 'Round the Zoo", "Don't Talk Now", and "The Blues Is Just a Bad Dream". In some other songs, Taylor romanticized his life, but he was plagued by self-doubt. By summer 1966, they were performing regularly at the high-visibility Night Owl Cafe in Greenwich Village, alongside acts such as the Turtles and Lothar and the Hand People.

Taylor associated with a motley group of people and began using heroin, to Kortchmar's dismay. In a late 1966 hasty recording session, the group cut a single, Taylor's "Night Owl", backed with his "Brighten Your Night with My Day". Released on Rainy Day Records, distributed by Jubilee Records, it received some radio airplay in the Northeast, but only charted at No. 102 nationally. Other songs had been recorded during the same session, but Jubilee declined to go forward with an album. After a series of poorly chosen appearances outside New York, culminating with a three-week stay at a failing nightspot in Freeport, Bahamas, for which they were never paid, the Flying Machine broke up. (A UK band with the same name emerged in 1969 with the hit song "Smile a Little Smile for Me". The Flying Machine was briefly referenced in Taylor's song "Fire and Rain", and following his success as a solo artist, the band's recordings were later released in 1971 as James Taylor and the Original Flying Machine.)

Taylor would later say of this New York period, "I learned a lot about music and too much about drugs." Indeed, his drug use had developed into full-blown heroin addiction during the final Flying Machine period: "I just fell into it, since it was as easy to get high in the Village as get a drink." He hung out in Washington Square Park, playing guitar to ward off depression and then passing out, letting runaways and criminals stay at his apartment. Finally out of money and abandoned by his manager, he made a desperate call one night to his father. Isaac Taylor flew to New York and staged a rescue, renting a car and driving all night back to North Carolina with James and his possessions. Taylor spent six months getting treatment and making a tentative recovery; he also required a throat operation to fix vocal cords damaged from singing too harshly.

Taylor decided to try being a solo act with a change of scenery. In late 1967, funded by a small family inheritance, he moved to London, living in various areas: Notting Hill, Belgravia, and Chelsea. After recording some demos in Soho, his friend Kortchmar gave him his next big break. Kortchmar used his association with the King Bees (who once opened for Peter and Gordon), to connect Taylor to Peter Asher. Asher was A&R head for the Beatles' newly formed label Apple Records. Taylor gave a demo tape of songs, including "Something in the Way She Moves", to Asher, who then played the demo for Beatles Paul McCartney and George Harrison. McCartney remembers his first impression: "I just heard his voice and his guitar and I thought he was great ... and he came and played live, so it was just like, 'Wow, he's great.'" Taylor became the first non-British act signed to Apple, and he credits Asher for "opening the door" to his singing career. Taylor said of Asher, who later became his manager, "I knew from the first time that we met that he was the right person to steer my career. He had this determination in his eye that I had never seen in anybody before." Living chaotically in various places with various women, Taylor wrote additional material, including "Carolina in My Mind", and rehearsed with a new backing band. Taylor recorded what would become his first album from July to October 1968, at Trident Studios, at the same time the Beatles were recording The White Album. McCartney and an uncredited George Harrison guested on "Carolina in My Mind", whose lyric "holy host of others standing around me" referred to the Beatles, and the title phrase of Taylor's "Something in the Way She Moves" provided the lyrical starting point for Harrison's classic "Something". McCartney and Asher brought in arranger Richard Anthony Hewson to add both orchestrations to several of the songs and unusual "link" passages between them; they would receive a mixed reception, at best.

James had been through so much by the time he was twenty that he had so much to express in his music. Other young artists of his age whom I worked with sang about how good or bad life was but really had no idea what they were singing about. James was already singing with the conviction of a singer much older than himself. Everything that he had already been through was evident in his songwriting.

— Peter Asher, Taylor's manager

During the recording sessions, Taylor fell back into his drug habit by using heroin and methedrine. He underwent physeptone treatment in a British program, returned to New York and was hospitalized there, and then finally committed himself to the Austen Riggs Center in Stockbridge, Massachusetts, which emphasized cultural and historical factors in trying to treat difficult psychiatric disorders. Meanwhile, Apple released his debut album, James Taylor, in December 1968 in the UK and February 1969 in the US. Critical reception was generally positive, including a complimentary review in Rolling Stone by Jon Landau, who said that "this album is the coolest breath of fresh air I've inhaled in a good long while. It knocks me out." The record's commercial potential suffered from Taylor's inability to promote it because of his hospitalization, and it sold poorly; "Carolina in My Mind" was released as a single but failed to chart in the UK and only reached No. 118 on the U.S. charts.

In July 1969, Taylor headlined a six-night stand at the Troubadour in Los Angeles. On July 20, he performed at the Newport Folk Festival as the last act and was cheered by thousands of fans who stayed in the rain to hear him. His set at Newport was cut short after 15 minutes, when festival co-founder George Wein announced on stage that the Apollo 11 astronauts had landed on the moon. Shortly thereafter, Taylor broke both hands and both feet in a motorcycle accident on Martha's Vineyard and was forced to stop playing for several months. However, while recovering, he continued to write songs and in October 1969 signed a new deal with Warner Bros. Records.

=== 1970–1972: Warner Bros. and career breakthrough ===
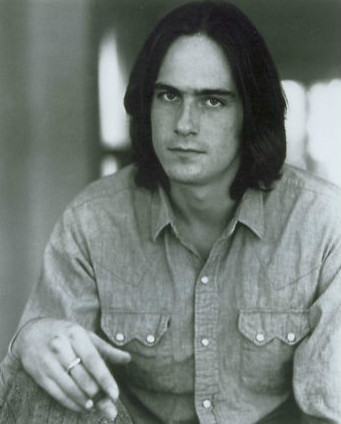
A publicity photograph of Taylor for his second studio album Sweet Baby James, December 1969

Once he had recovered, Taylor moved to California, keeping Asher as his manager and record producer. In December 1969, he held the recording sessions for his second album there. Titled Sweet Baby James, and featuring the participation of Carole King, the album was released in February 1970 and was Taylor's critical and popular breakthrough, buoyed by the single "Fire and Rain", a song about both Taylor's experiences attempting to break his drug habit by undergoing treatment in psychiatric institutions and the suicide of his friend Suzanne Schnerr. Both the album and the single reached No. 3 on the Billboard charts, with Sweet Baby James selling more than 1.5 million copies in its first year and eventually more than 3 million in the United States alone. Sweet Baby James was received at its time as a folk-rock masterpiece, an album that effectively showcased Taylor's talents to the mainstream public, marking a direction he would take in following years. It earned several Grammy Award nominations including one for Album of the Year. It went on to be listed at No. 103 on Rolling Stone's 500 Greatest Albums of All Time in 2003, with "Fire and Rain" listed as No. 227 on Rolling Stone's 500 Greatest Songs of All Time in 2004.

During the time that Sweet Baby James was released, Taylor appeared with Dennis Wilson of the Beach Boys in a Monte Hellman film, Two-Lane Blacktop. In October 1970, he performed with his then partner Joni Mitchell, Phil Ochs, and the Canadian band Chilliwack at a Vancouver benefit concert that funded Greenpeace's protests of 1971 nuclear weapons tests by the US Atomic Energy Commission at Amchitka, Alaska; this performance was released in album format in 2009 as Amchitka, The 1970 Concert That Launched Greenpeace. In January 1971, sessions for Taylor's next album began.

He appeared on The Johnny Cash Show, singing "Sweet Baby James", "Fire and Rain", and "Country Road", on February 17, 1971. His career success at this point and appeal to female fans of various ages piqued tremendous interest in him, prompting a March 1, 1971, Time magazine cover story of him as "the face of new rock". It compared his strong-but-brooding persona to that of Wuthering Heights' Heathcliff and to The Sorrows of Young Werther, and said, "Taylor's use of elemental imagery—darkness and sunlight, references to roads traveled and untraveled, to fears spoken and left unsaid—reaches a level both of intimacy and controlled emotion rarely achieved in purely pop music." One of the writers described his look as "a cowboy Jesus", to which Taylor later replied, "I thought I was trying to look like George Harrison."

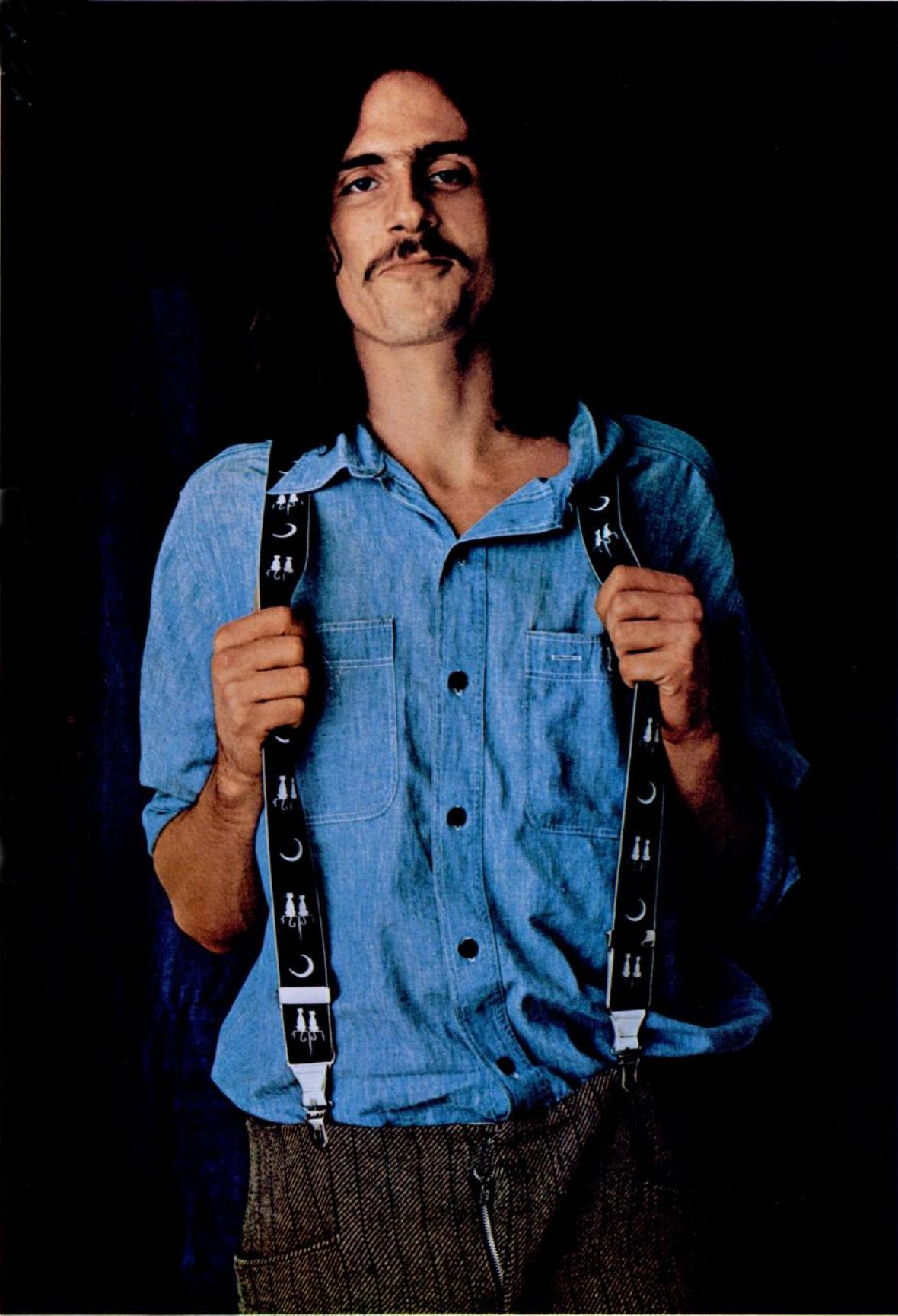
Taylor in a publicity photograph for his 1971 studio album Mud Slide Slim and the Blue Horizon

Released in April 1971, Mud Slide Slim and the Blue Horizon also gained critical acclaim and contained Taylor's biggest hit single in the US, a version of Carole King's new "You've Got a Friend" (featuring backing vocals by Joni Mitchell), which reached No. 1 on the Billboard Hot 100 in late July. The follow-up single, "Long Ago and Far Away", also made the Top 40 and reached No. 4 on the Billboard Adult Contemporary chart. The album itself reached No. 2 on the album charts, which would be Taylor's highest position ever until the release of his 2015 album, Before This World, which went to No. 1 superseding Taylor Swift. In early 1972, Taylor won his first Grammy Award for Best Pop Vocal Performance, Male, for "You've Got a Friend"; King also won Song of the Year for the same song in that ceremony. The album went on to sell 2.5 million copies in the United States.

November 1972 heralded the release of Taylor's fourth album, One Man Dog. A concept album primarily recorded in his home recording studio, it featured a cameo by Linda Ronstadt along with Carole King, Carly Simon, and John McLaughlin. The album consisted of eighteen short pieces of music put together. Reception was generally lukewarm and, despite making the Top 10 of the Billboard Album Charts, its overall sales were disappointing. The lead single, "Don't Let Me Be Lonely Tonight", peaked at No. 14 on the Hot 100, and the follow-up, "One Man Parade", barely reached the Top 75. Almost simultaneously, Taylor married fellow singer-songwriter Carly Simon on November 3, in a small ceremony at her Murray Hill, Manhattan, apartment. A post-concert party following a Taylor performance at Radio City Music Hall turned into a large-scale wedding party, and the Simon-Taylor marriage would find much public attention over the following years. They had two children, Sarah Maria "Sally" Taylor, born January 7, 1974, and Benjamin Simon "Ben" Taylor, born January 22, 1977. During their marriage, the couple would guest on each other's albums and have two hit singles as duet partners: a cover of Inez & Charlie Foxx's "Mockingbird" and a version of The Everly Brothers' "Devoted to You".

=== 1973–1976: Continued success and Greatest Hits ===
Taylor spent most of 1973 enjoying his new life as a married man and did not return to the recording studio until January 1974, when sessions for his fifth album began. Walking Man was released in June and featured appearances of Paul and Linda McCartney and guitarist David Spinozza. The album was a critical and commercial disappointment and was his first album to miss the Top 5 since his contract with Warner. It received poor reviews and sold only 300,000 copies in the United States. The title track failed to appear on the Top 100.

However, Taylor's artistic fortunes spiked again in 1975 when the Gold album Gorilla reached No. 6 and provided one of his biggest hit singles, a version of Marvin Gaye's "How Sweet It Is (To Be Loved by You)", featuring wife Carly on backing vocals and reached No. 5 in America and No. 1 in Canada. On the Billboard Adult Contemporary chart, the track also reached the top, and the follow-up single, the feelgood "Mexico", featuring a guest appearance by Crosby & Nash, also reached the Top 5 of that list. A well-received album, Gorilla showcased Taylor's electric, lighter side that was evident on Walking Man. However, it was arguably a more consistent and fresher-sounding Taylor, with songs such as "Mexico", "Wandering" and "Angry Blues". It also featured a song about his daughter Sally, "Sarah Maria".

Gorilla was followed in 1976 by In the Pocket, Taylor's last studio album to be released under Warner Bros. Records. The album found him with many colleagues and friends, including Art Garfunkel, David Crosby, Bonnie Raitt, and Stevie Wonder (who co-wrote a song with Taylor and contributed a harmonica solo). A melodic album, it was highlighted with the single "Shower the People", an enduring song that hit No. 1 on the Adult Contemporary chart and hit 22 on the Pop Charts. However, the album was not well received, reaching No. 16 and being criticized, particularly by Rolling Stone. Still, In The Pocket went on to be certified gold.

With the close of Taylor's contract with Warner, in November, the label released Greatest Hits, the album that comprised most of his best work between 1970 and 1976. With time, it became his best-selling album ever. It was certified 11× Platinum in the US, earned a Diamond certification by the RIAA, and eventually sold close to 20 million copies worldwide.

=== 1977–1981: Move to Columbia Records ===
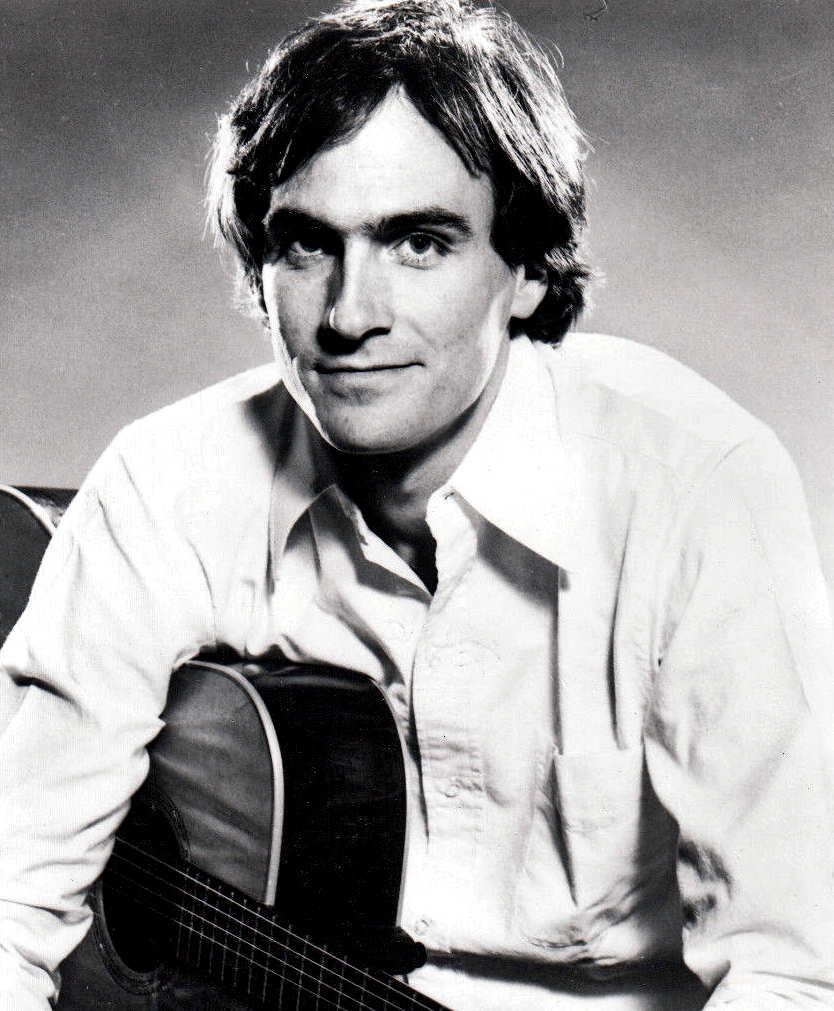
Taylor in 1977

In 1977 Taylor signed with Columbia Records. Between March and April, he quickly recorded his first album for the label. JT, released that June, gave Taylor his best reviews since Sweet Baby James, earning a Grammy nomination for Album of the Year in 1978. Peter Herbst of Rolling Stone was particularly favorable to the album, of which he wrote in its August 11, 1977, issue, "JT is the least stiff and by far the most various album Taylor has done. That's not meant to criticize Taylor's earlier efforts. ... But it's nice to hear him sounding so healthy." JT reached No. 4 on the Billboard charts and sold more than 3 million copies in the United States alone. The album's Triple Platinum status ties it with Sweet Baby James as Taylor's all-time biggest-selling studio album. It was propelled by Jimmy Jones's and Otis Blackwell's "Handy Man", which hit No. 1 on Billboard's Adult Contemporary chart and reached No. 4 on the Hot 100, earning Taylor another Grammy Award for Best Male Pop Vocal Performance. The song also topped the Canadian charts. The success of the album propelled the release of two further singles; the up-tempo pop "Your Smiling Face", an enduring live favorite, reached the American Top 20; however, "Honey Don't Leave L.A.", which Danny Kortchmar wrote and composed for Taylor, did not enjoy much success, reaching only No. 61.

Back in the forefront of popular music, Taylor guested with Paul Simon on Art Garfunkel's recording of Sam Cooke's "Wonderful World", which reached the Top 20 in the U.S. and topped the AC charts in early 1978. After briefly working on Broadway, he took a one-year break, reappearing in the summer of 1979, with the cover-studded Platinum album titled Flag, featuring a Top 30 version of Gerry Goffin's and Carole King's "Up on the Roof". (Two selections from Flag, "Millworker" and "Brother Trucker" were featured on the PBS production of the Broadway musical based on Studs Terkel's non-fiction book Working, which Terkel himself hosted. Taylor himself appeared in that production as a trucker; he performed "Brother Trucker" in character.) Taylor also appeared on the No Nukes concert in Madison Square Garden, where he made a memorable live performance of "Mockingbird" with his wife Carly. The concert appeared on both the No Nukes album and film.

On December 7, 1980, Taylor had an encounter with Mark David Chapman who would murder John Lennon just one day later. Taylor told the BBC in 2010: "The guy had sort of pinned me to the wall and was glistening with maniacal sweat and talking some freak speak about what he was going to do and his stuff with how John was interested, and he was going to get in touch with John Lennon. And it was surreal to actually have contact with the guy 24 hours before he shot John." The next night, Taylor, who lived in a building next door to Lennon, heard the assassination occur. Taylor commented: "I heard him shoot—five, just as quick as you could pull the trigger, about five explosions."

In March 1981, Taylor released the album Dad Loves His Work whose themes concerned his relationship with his father, the course his ancestors had taken, and the effect that he and Simon had on each other. The album was another Platinum success, reaching No. 10 and providing Taylor's final real hit single in a duet with JD Souther, "Her Town Too", which reached No. 5 on the Adult Contemporary chart and No. 11 on the Billboard Hot 100.

=== 1981–1996: Troubled times and new beginnings ===
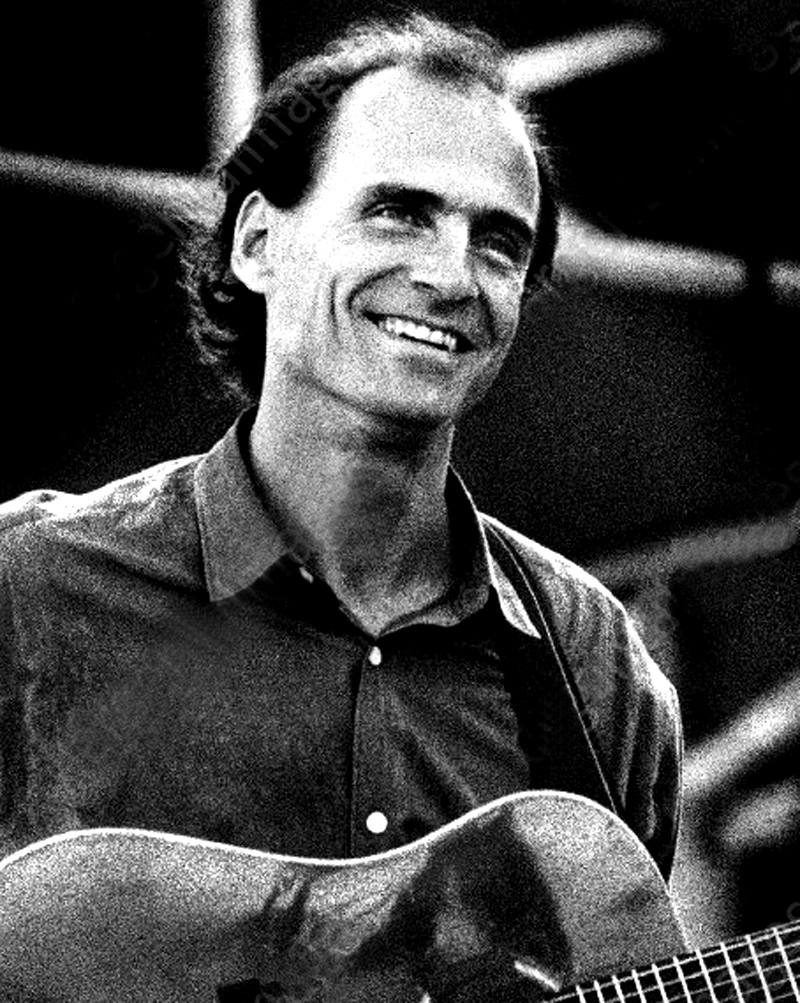
Taylor at Winterfest, 1985

Simon announced her separation from Taylor in September 1981 saying, "Our needs are different; it seem[s] impossible to stay together" and their divorce finalized in 1983. Their breakup was highly publicized. At the time, Taylor was living on West End Avenue in Manhattan and on a methadone maintenance program to cure him of his drug addiction. Over the course of four months starting in September 1983, spurred on in part by the deaths of his friends John Belushi and Dennis Wilson and in part by the desire to be a better father to his children Sally and Ben, he discontinued methadone and overcame his heroin habit.

Taylor had thoughts of retiring by the time he played the Rock in Rio festival in Rio de Janeiro in January 1985. He was encouraged by the nascent democracy in Brazil at the time, buoyed by the positive reception he got from the large crowd and other musicians, and musically energized by the sounds and nature of Brazilian music. "I had ... sort of bottomed-out in a drug habit, my marriage with Carly had dissolved, and I had basically been depressed and lost for a while", he recalled in 1995:

I sort of hit a low spot. I was asked to go down to Rio de Janeiro to play in this festival down there. We put the band together and went down and it was just an amazing response. I played to 300,000 people. They not only knew my music, they knew things about it and were interested in aspects of it that to that point had only interested me. To have that kind of validation right about then was really what I needed. It helped get me back on track.

The song "Only a Dream in Rio" was written in tribute to that night, with lines like "I was there that very day and my heart came back alive." The October 1985 album, That's Why I'm Here, from which that song came, started a series of studio recordings that, while spaced further apart than his previous records, showed a more consistent level of quality and fewer covers, most notably the Buddy Holly song "Everyday", released as a single reached No. 61. On the album track "Only One", the backing vocals were performed by an all-star duo of Joni Mitchell and Don Henley.

Taylor's next albums were partially successful; in 1988, he released Never Die Young, highlighted with the charting title track, and in 1991, the platinum New Moon Shine provided Taylor some popular songs with "Copperline" and "(I've Got to) Stop Thinkin' About That", both hit singles on Adult Contemporary radio. In the late 1980s, he began touring regularly, especially on the summer amphitheater circuit. His later concerts feature songs spanning his career and are marked by the musicianship of his band and backup singers. The 1993 two-disc Live album captures this, with a highlight being Arnold McCuller's descants in the codas of "Shower the People" and "I Will Follow". He provided a guest voice to The Simpsons episode "Deep Space Homer", and also appeared later on in the series when the family put together a jigsaw puzzle with his face as the missing final piece. In 1995, Taylor performed the role of the Lord in Randy Newman's Faust.

=== 1997–2008: Hourglass, October Road, Christmas albums and Covers ===
Taylor in concert at DeVos Hall, Grand Rapids, Michigan – April 2006

In 1997, after six years since his last studio album, Taylor released Hourglass, an introspective album that gave him the best critical reviews in almost twenty years. The album had much of its focus on Taylor's troubled past and family. "Jump Up Behind Me" paid tribute to his father's rescue of him after The Flying Machine days, and the long drive from New York City back to his home in Chapel Hill. "Enough To Be on Your Way" was inspired by the alcoholism-related death of his brother Alex earlier in the decade. The themes were also inspired by Taylor and Walker's divorce, which took place in 1996. Rolling Stone Magazine found that "one of the themes of this record is disbelief", while Taylor told the magazine that it was "spirituals for agnostics". Critics embraced the dark themes on the album, and Hourglass was a commercial success, reaching No. 9 on the Billboard 200 (Taylor's first Top 10 album in sixteen years) and also provided a big adult contemporary hit on "Little More Time With You". The album also gave Taylor his first Grammy since JT, when he was honored with Best Pop Album in 1998. A concert in New York City at the start of the 1998 summer tour in support of the album was aired live on PBS before being released on DVD and VHS in the fall of 1998.

Flanked by two greatest hit releases, Taylor's Platinum-certified October Road appeared in 2002 to a receptive audience. It featured a number of quiet instrumental accompaniments and passages. Overall, it found Taylor in a more peaceful frame of mind; rather than facing a crisis now, Taylor said in an interview that "I thought I'd passed the midpoint of my life when I was 17." The album appeared in two versions, a single-disc version and a "limited edition" two-disc version which contained three extra songs including a duet with Mark Knopfler, "Sailing to Philadelphia", which also appeared on Knopfler's album by the same name. Also in 2002, Taylor teamed with bluegrass musician Alison Krauss in singing "The Boxer" at the Kennedy Center Honors Tribute to Paul Simon. They later recorded the Louvin Brothers duet, "How's the World Treating You?" In 2004, after he chose not to renew his record contract with Columbia/Sony, he released James Taylor: A Christmas Album with distribution through Hallmark Cards.

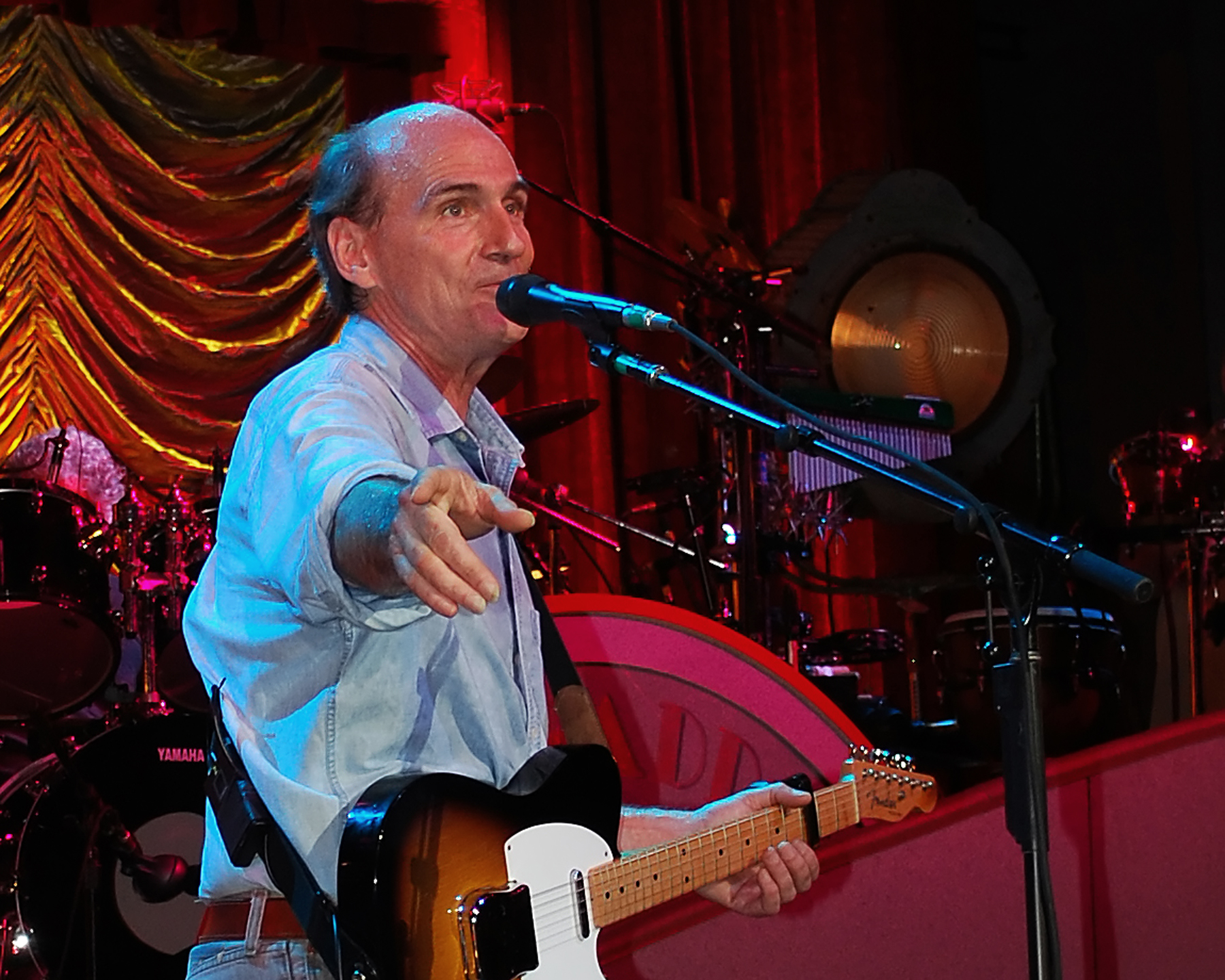
Taylor performing at Tanglewood in 2008

Taylor performed "The Star-Spangled Banner" at Game 2 of the World Series in Boston on October 24, 2004, on October 25, 2007, both the anthem and "America" for the game on October 24, 2013, and Game 1 on October 23, 2018. He also performed at Game 1 of the 2008 NBA Finals in Boston on June 5, 2008, and at the NHL's Winter Classic game between the Philadelphia Flyers and Boston Bruins.

In December 2004, he appeared as himself in an episode of The West Wing entitled "A Change Is Gonna Come". He sang Sam Cooke's classic "A Change Is Gonna Come" at an event honoring an artist played by Taylor's wife Caroline. Later on, he appeared on CMT's Crossroads alongside the Dixie Chicks. In early 2006, MusiCares honored Taylor with performances of his songs by an array of notable musicians. Before a performance by the Chicks, lead singer Natalie Maines acknowledged that he had always been one of their musical heroes and had, for them, lived up to their once-imagined reputation of him. They performed his song, "Shower the People", with a surprise appearance by Arnold McCuller, who has sung backing vocals on Taylor's live tours and albums for many years.

In the fall of 2006, Taylor released a repackaged and slightly different version of his Hallmark Christmas album, now entitled James Taylor at Christmas, and distributed by Columbia/Sony. In 2006, Taylor performed Randy Newman's song "Our Town" for the Disney animated film Cars. The song was nominated for the 2007 Academy Award for the Best Original Song. On January 1, 2007, Taylor headlined the inaugural concert at the Times Union Center in Albany, New York, honoring newly sworn in Governor of New York Eliot Spitzer.

Taylor's next album, One Man Band, was released on CD and DVD in November 2007 on Starbucks' Hear Music Label, where he joined with Paul McCartney and Joni Mitchell. The introspective album grew out of a three-year tour of the United States and Europe called the One Man Band Tour, featuring some of Taylor's most beloved songs and anecdotes about their creative origins—accompanied solely by the "one man band" of his longtime pianist/keyboardist, Larry Goldings. The digital discrete 5.1 surround sound mix of One Man Band won a TEC Award for best surround sound recording in 2008.

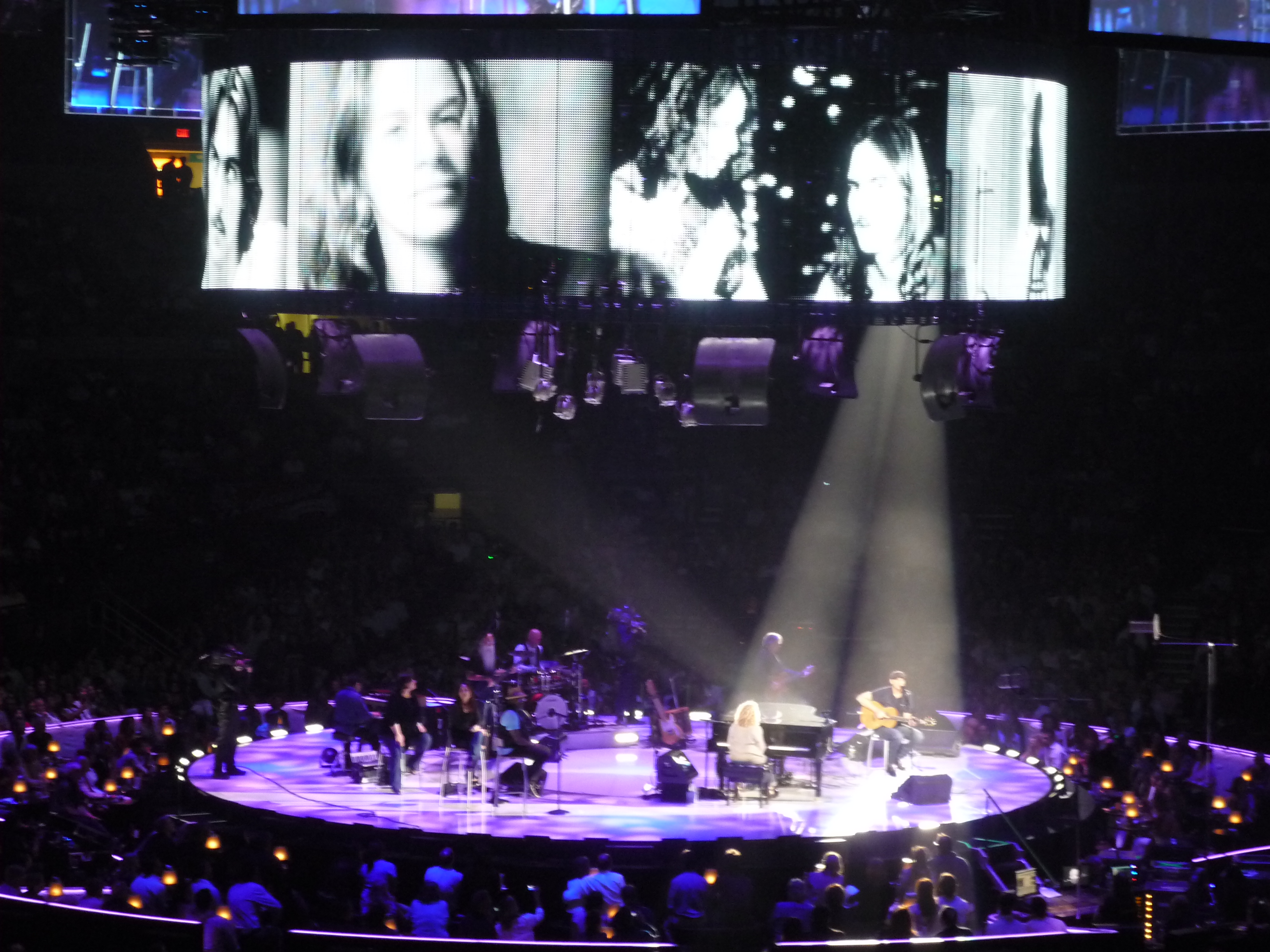
Taylor and Carole King performing "You've Got a Friend" together during their Troubadour Reunion Tour in 2010

On November 28–30, 2007, Taylor accompanied by his original band and Carole King, headlined a series of six shows at the Troubadour. The appearances marked the 50th anniversary of the venue, where Taylor, King and many others, such as Tom Waits, Neil Diamond, and Elton John, performed early in their music careers. Proceeds from the concert went to benefit the Natural Resources Defense Council, MusiCares, Alliance for the Wild Rockies, and the Los Angeles Regional Foodbank (a member of America's Second Harvest, the nation's Food Bank Network). Parts of the performance shown on CBS Sunday Morning in the December 23, 2007, broadcast showed Taylor alluding to his early drug problems by saying, "I played here a number of times in the 70s, allegedly". Taylor has used versions of this joke on other occasions, and it appears as part of his One Man Band DVD and tour performances.

In December 2007, James Taylor at Christmas was nominated for a Grammy Award.

In January 2008, Taylor recorded approximately 20 songs by others for a new album with a band including Luis Conte, Michael Landau, Lou Marini, Arnold McCuller, Jimmy Johnson, David Lasley, Walt Fowler, Andrea Zonn, Kate Markowitz, Steve Gadd and Larry Goldings. The resulting live-in-studio album, named Covers, was released in September 2008. The album forays into country and soul while being the latest proof that Taylor is a more versatile singer than his best-known hits might suggest. The Covers sessions stretched to include "Oh What a Beautiful Morning", from the musical Oklahoma!, a song that his grandmother had caught him singing over and over at the top of his lungs when he was seven years old. Meanwhile, in summer 2008, Taylor and this band toured 34 North American cities with a tour entitled James Taylor and His Band of Legends. An additional album, called Other Covers, came out in April 2009, containing songs that were recorded during the same sessions as the original Covers but had not been put out to the full public yet.

=== 2009–2014: Notable appearances ===
On May 29, 2009, Taylor performed on the final episode of the original 17-year run of The Tonight Show with Jay Leno.

On September 8, 2009, Taylor made an appearance at the 24th-season premiere block party of The Oprah Winfrey Show on Chicago's Michigan Avenue.

Taylor appeared briefly in the 2009 movie Funny People, where he played "Carolina in My Mind" for a MySpace corporate event as the opening act for the main character.

On January 1, 2010, Taylor sang the American national anthem at the NHL Winter Classic at Fenway Park, while Daniel Powter sang the Canadian national anthem.

On March 7, 2010, Taylor sang the Beatles' "In My Life" in tribute to deceased artists at the 82nd Academy Awards.

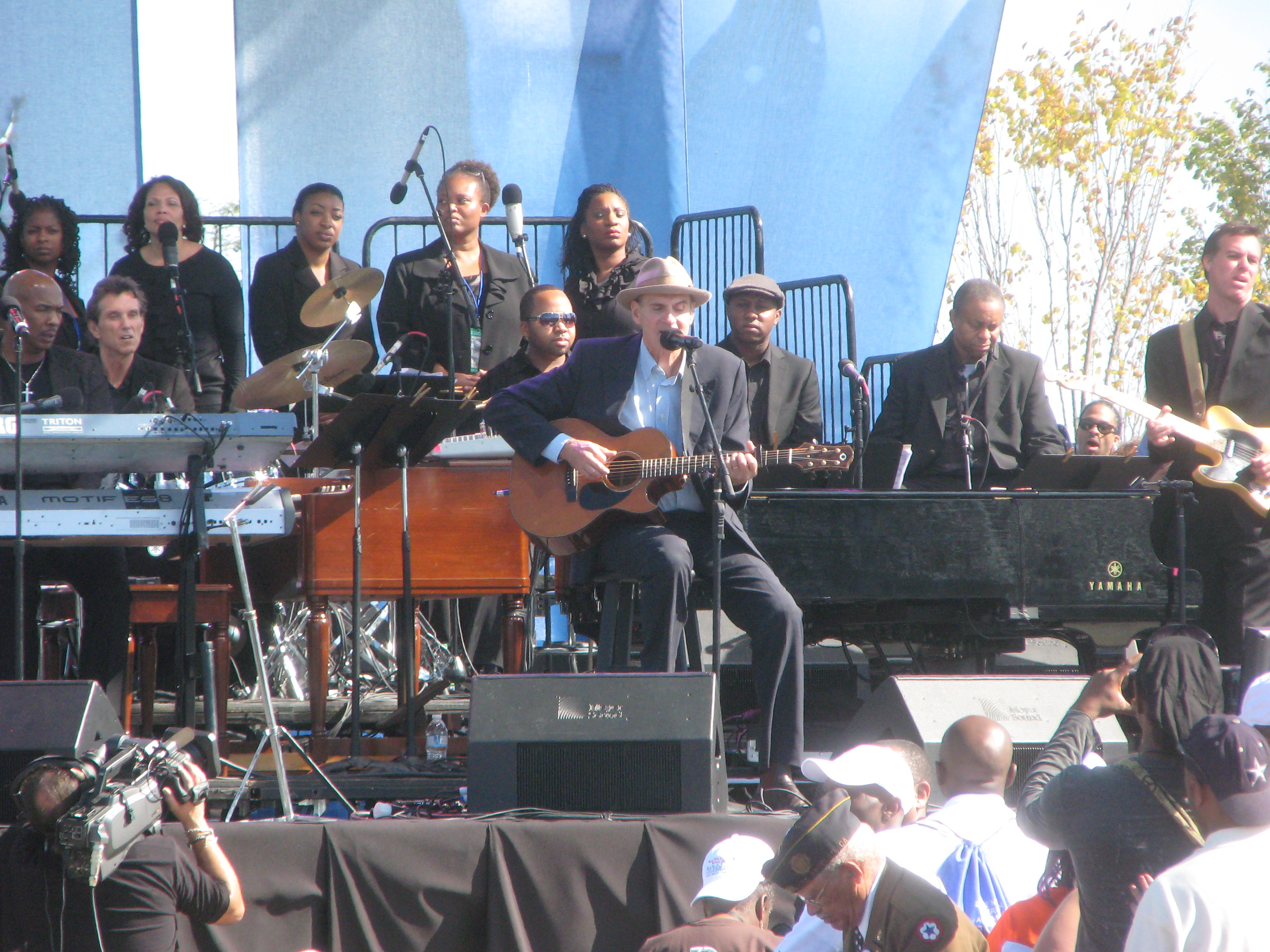
Taylor at the October 16, 2011, Martin Luther King, Jr. Memorial dedication concert

In March 2010, he commenced the Troubadour Reunion Tour with Carole King and members of his original band, including Russ Kunkel, Leland Sklar, and Danny Kortchmar. They played shows in Australia, New Zealand, Japan and North America with the final night being at the Honda Center, in Anaheim, California. The tour was a major commercial success and in many locations found Taylor playing large NBA and NHL arenas (which continues as of 2026) instead of his usual smaller arenas, theaters or amphitheaters. Ticket sales amounted to over 700,000 and the tour grossed over $59 million. It was one of the most successful tours of the year.

He appeared in 2011 in the ABC comedy Mr. Sunshine as the ex-husband of the character played by Allison Janney, and he performs a duet of sorts on Leon Russell's 1970 classic "A Song for You".

On September 11, 2011, Taylor performed "You Can Close Your Eyes" in New York City at the National September 11 Memorial & Museum for the 10th anniversary of the 9/11 attacks.

On November 22, 2011, Taylor performed "Fire and Rain" with Taylor Swift, who was named after him, at the last concert of her Speak Now World Tour in Madison Square Garden. They also sang Swift's song, "Fifteen". Then, on July 2, 2012, Swift appeared as Taylor's special guest in a concert at Tanglewood.

On April 24, 2013, Taylor performed at the memorial service for slain MIT police officer Sean Collier, who was killed by Tamerlan and Dzhokhar Tsarnaev, the men responsible for the Boston Marathon bombing. Taylor was accompanied by the MIT Symphony Orchestra and three MIT a cappella groups while performing his songs "The Water is Wide" and "Shower the People".

On September 6 and 7, 2013, he performed with the Utah Symphony and the Mormon Tabernacle Choir in the Thirtieth Anniversary O.C. Tanner Gift of Music Gala Concert at the Conference Center in Salt Lake City. He called the choir "a national treasure" In addition to the symphony and choir he was backed by some of his touring band: pianist Charles Floyd, bassist Jimmy Johnson and percussionist Nick Halley.

=== 2015–2020: Before this World and American Standard ===
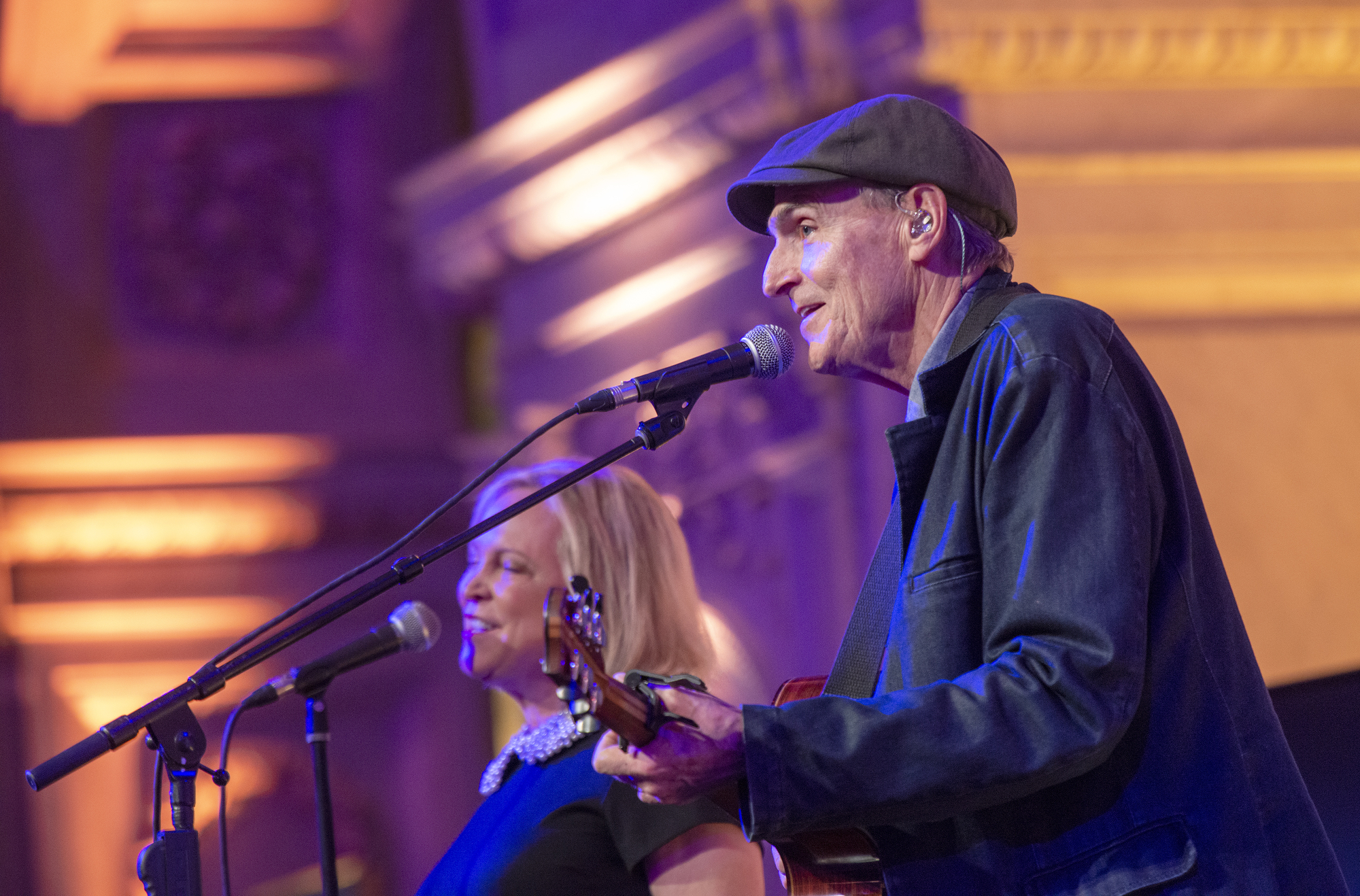
Kim and James Taylor in 2020

After a 45-year wait, James earned his first No. 1 album on the Billboard 200 chart with Before This World. The album, which was released on June 16 through Concord Records, arrived on top the chart of July 4, 2015, more than 45 years after Taylor arrived on the list with Sweet Baby James (on the March 14, 1970, list). The album launched atop the Billboard 200 with 97,000 equivalent album units earned in the week ending June 21, 2015, according to Nielsen Music. Of its start, pure album sales were 96,000 copies sold, Taylor's best debut week for an album since 2002's October Road.

Taylor cancelled his 2017 concert in Manila as a protest to the extrajudicial killings of suspects in the Philippine drug war.

In January 2020, Taylor released his audio memoir Break Shot: My First 21 Years on the streaming service Audible.

Taylor's album American Standard was released on February 28, 2020. American Standard debuted at No. 4 on the Billboard 200 albums chart, making Taylor the first act to earn a top 10 album in each of the last six decades. On November 24, 2020, the album was nominated for a Grammy in the category of "Best Traditional Pop Vocal Album". At the 63rd Grammy Awards, the album won the award, the first for James Taylor after being nominated in the same category in the 50th Grammy Awards in 2008 for James Taylor at Christmas.

=== 2021–present: Continued touring ===
In May 2020, James Taylor and Jackson Browne rescheduled their 2020 tour dates to 2021 due to the COVID-19 crisis.

On August 20, 2022, Taylor performed at Tanglewood in celebration of John Williams's 90th birthday. Taylor appeared with Carole King in the 2022 documentary Carole King and James Taylor: Just Call Out My Name.

As of 2026 Taylor continues to actively tour.

== Politics ==
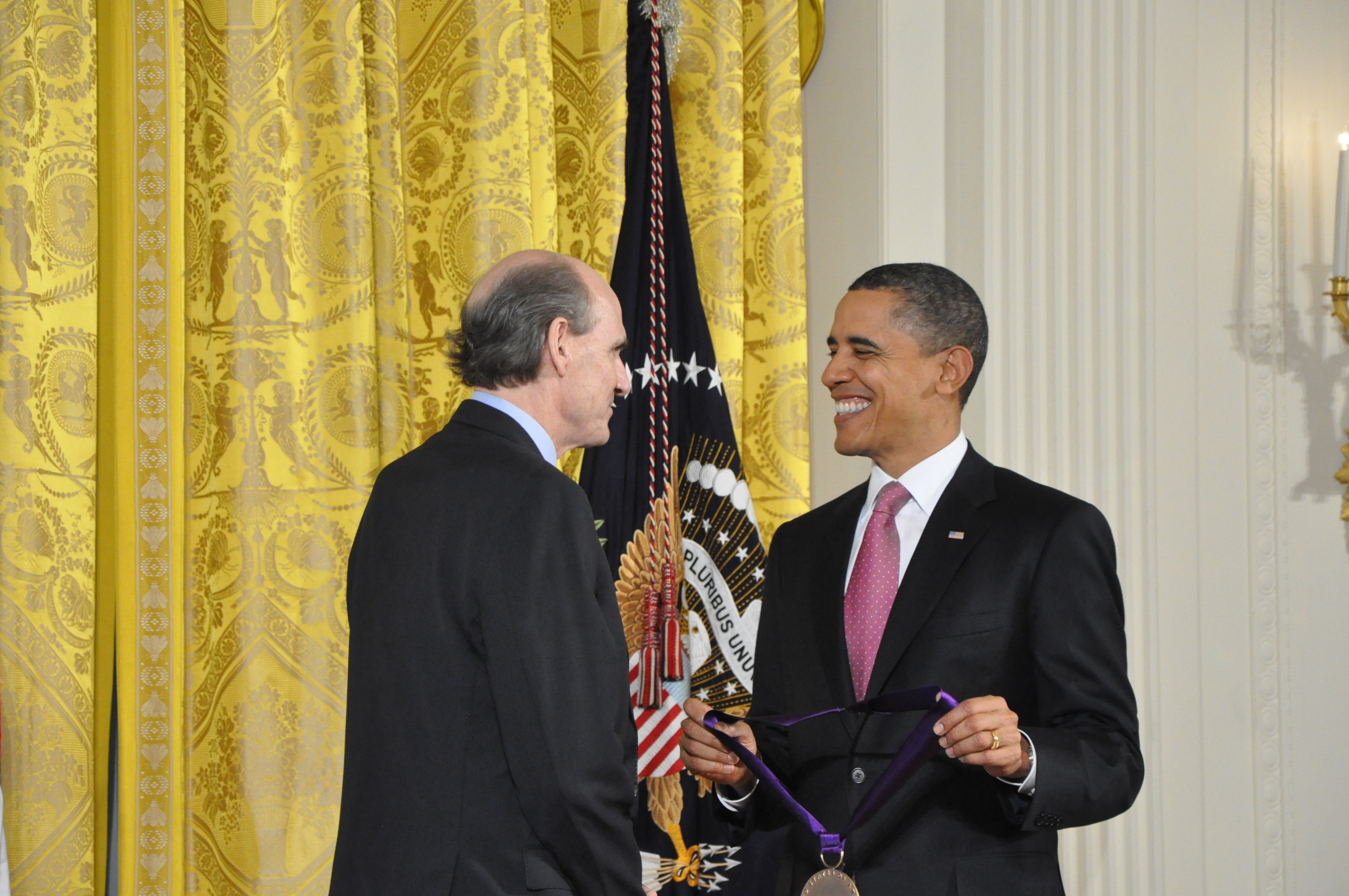
Taylor with U.S. President Barack Obama in 2011, preparing to be awarded the National Medal of Arts

Always visibly active in environmental and liberal causes, in October 2004, Taylor joined the Vote for Change tour playing a series of concerts in American swing states. These concerts were organized by MoveOn.org with the goal of mobilizing people to vote for John Kerry and against George W. Bush in that year's presidential campaign. Taylor's appearances were joint performances with the Dixie Chicks.

During October 19–21, 2008, Taylor performed a series of free concerts in five North Carolina cities in support of Barack Obama's presidential bid. On Sunday, January 18, 2009, he performed at the We Are One: The Obama Inaugural Celebration at the Lincoln Memorial, singing "Shower the People" with John Legend and Jennifer Nettles of Sugarland.

Taylor was active in support of Barack Obama's 2012 reelection campaign and opened the 2012 Democratic National Convention singing three songs. He performed "America the Beautiful" at the President's second inauguration.

Taylor performed multiple songs, including "America the Beautiful", "Sweet Baby James", and "You've Got a Friend" at a rally held by Tim Walz on October 24, 2024, in Wilmington, North Carolina, as part of the Kamala Harris 2024 presidential campaign.

In December 2016, Taylor announced that he was canceling his scheduled February 2017 concert in Manila, Philippines. The decision was made in protest of the rising number of extrajudicial killings linked to the Philippine drug war under the administration of President Rodrigo Duterte. In a public statement, Taylor remarked that while he recognized the necessity of prosecuting the illegal drug trade, the reports of summary executions without judicial due process were "deeply concerning and unacceptable to anyone who loves the rule of law."

Seven years later, following a change in the Philippine political administration, Taylor announced his return to the country. As part of his "An Evening with James Taylor & his All-Star Band" tour, he successfully performed a rescheduled concert on April 8, 2024, marking his first performance in the Philippines since 1994.

== Personal life ==
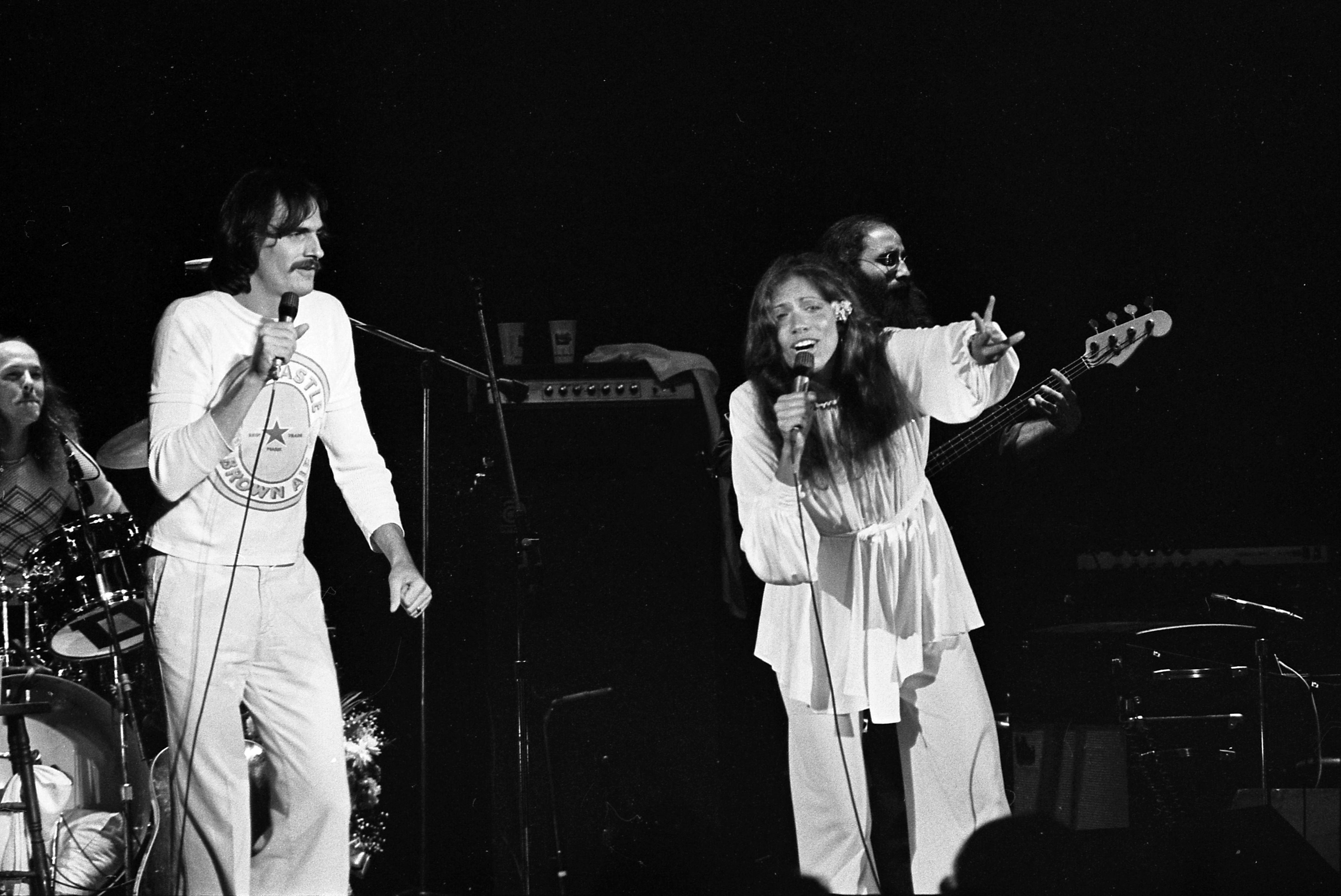
Taylor performing with his first wife and fellow singer Carly Simon in 1975

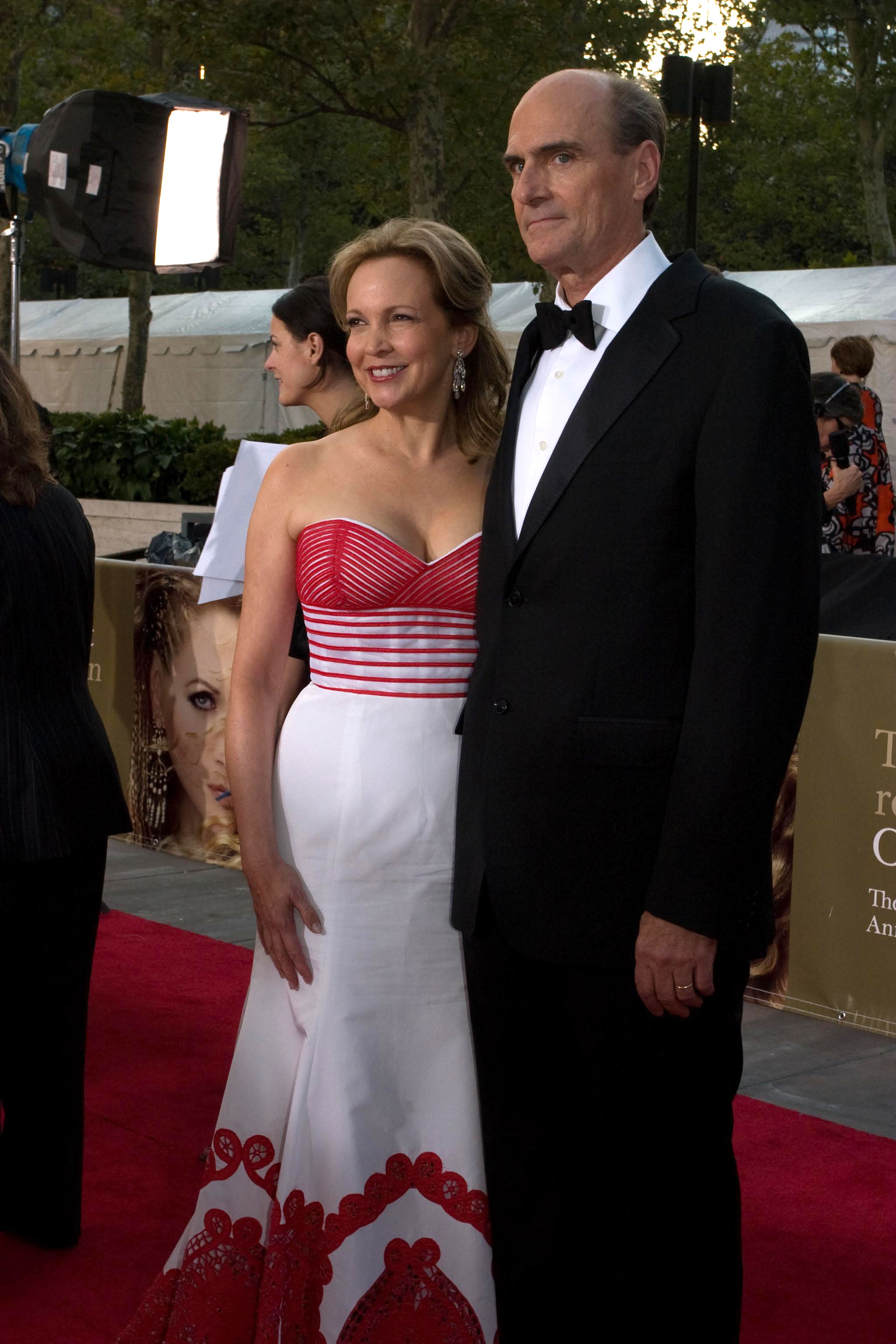
Taylor and Smedvig in September 2008

Taylor married singer-songwriter Carly Simon on November 3, 1972, in a low-key ceremony at Simon's home in New York. Taylor was 24 and Simon 29. (Note: Narrowing the five-year age gap between Taylor and herself, Simon long pegged her age to a 1945 birthdate, but birth records prove she was born in 1943.) They divorced in 1983. Their children, Sally and Ben, are also musicians.

Taylor married actress Kathryn Walker at the Cathedral of St. John the Divine on December 14, 1985. She helped him fight his heroin addiction, but they divorced in 1996.

In 1995, Taylor began dating Caroline "Kim" Smedvig, the director of public relations and marketing for the Boston Symphony Orchestra. They had met when he performed with composer John Williams and the Boston Pops orchestra. They were married at the Emmanuel Episcopal Church in Boston on February 18, 2001. Part of their relationship was worked into the 2002 album October Road, specifically on the songs "On the 4th of July" and "Caroline I See You". Following the birth of their twin sons Rufus and Henry in April 2001, they settled in Lenox, Massachusetts. Their son Henry has toured as a backing vocalist with his father as of 2021.

== Awards and recognition ==
=== Grammy Awards ===
Year	Category	Nominated work	Result
1971	Album of the Year	Sweet Baby James	Nominated
1971	Best Contemporary Vocal Performance, Male	Sweet Baby James	Nominated
1971	Best Contemporary Song	"Fire and Rain"	Nominated
1971	Record Of The Year	"Fire and Rain"	Nominated
1971	Song of the Year	"Fire and Rain"	Nominated
1972	Best Pop Vocal Performance, Male	"You've Got a Friend"	Won
1972	Record of the Year	"You've Got a Friend"	Nominated
1978	Best Pop Vocal Performance, Male	"Handy Man"	Won
1978	Album of the Year	JT	Nominated
1980	Best Pop Vocal Performance, Male	"Up On The Roof"	Nominated
1998	Best Pop Album	Hourglass	Won
2002	Best Male Pop Vocal Performance	"Don't Let Me Be Lonely Tonight"	Won
2003	Best Male Pop Vocal Performance	"October Road"	Nominated
2004	Best Country Collaboration with Vocals	"How's The World Treating You" with Alison Krauss	Won
2008	Best Traditional Pop Vocal Album	James Taylor at Christmas	Nominated
2009	Best Pop Vocal Album	Covers	Nominated
2009	Best Male Pop Vocal Performance	"Wichita Lineman"	Nominated
2016	Best Pop Vocal Album	"Before This World"	Nominated
2021	Best Traditional Pop Vocal Album	American Standard	Won

In 2006, Taylor was the Grammy Award-sponsored MusiCares Person of the Year. At a black tie ceremony held in Los Angeles, musicians from several eras (most prominently from his era) paid tribute to Taylor by performing his songs, often prefacing them with remarks on his influence on their decisions to become musicians. Artists include Carole King, Bruce Springsteen, Sting, Taj Mahal, Dr. John, Bonnie Raitt, Jackson Browne, David Crosby, Sheryl Crow, India.Arie, The Chicks, Jerry Douglas, Alison Krauss, and Keith Urban. Paul Simon performed as well, although he was not included in the televised program; Taylor's brother Livingston appeared on stage as a "backup singer" for the finale, along with Taylor's twin boys, Rufus and Henry. The concert was released on DVD in the fall of 2006 and broadcast on Public Television for the Holiday season of that same year.

=== Other recognition ===
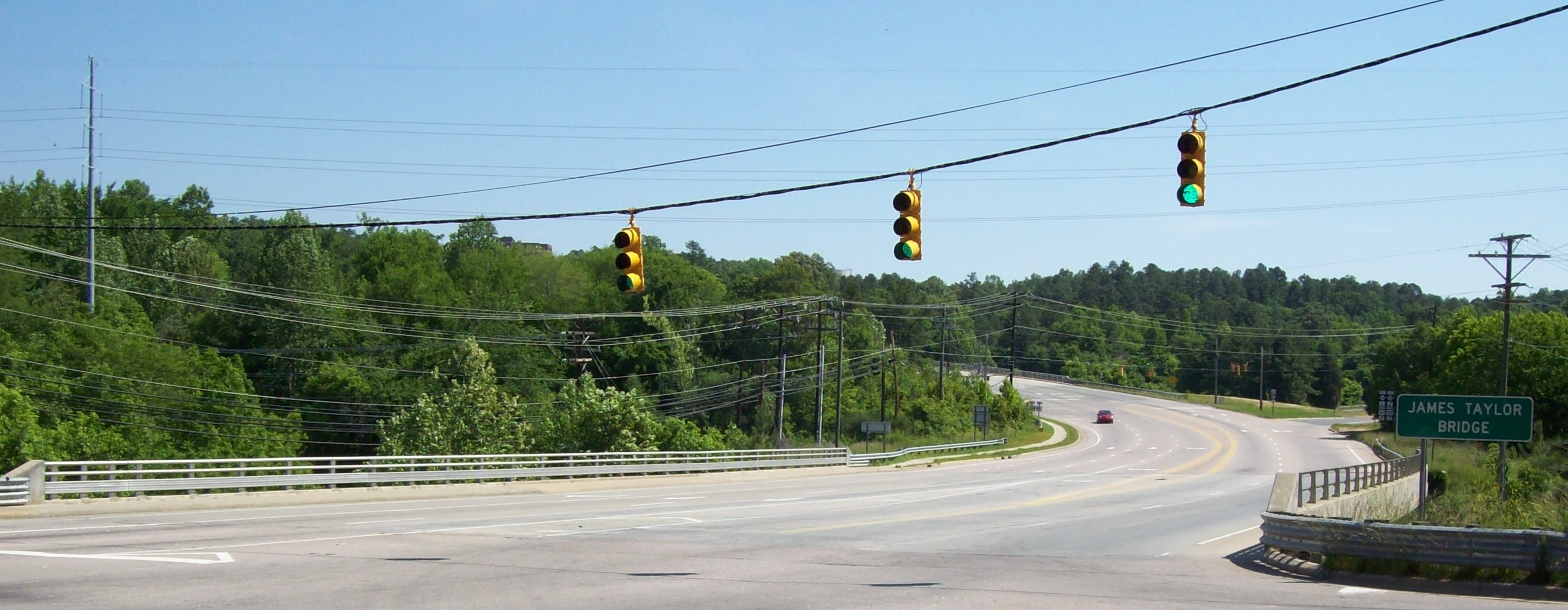
James Taylor Bridge, Chapel Hill, North Carolina

- 1995: Honorary doctorate of music from the Berklee College of Music, Boston, 1995.
- 2000: Inducted into the Rock and Roll Hall of Fame, 2000.
- 2000: Inducted into the Songwriters Hall of Fame, 2000.
- 2003: The Chapel Hill Museum in Chapel Hill, North Carolina, opened a permanent exhibit dedicated to Taylor. At the same occasion the US-15-501 highway bridge over Morgan Creek, near the site of the Taylor family home and mentioned in Taylor's song "Copperline", was named in honor of Taylor.
- 2004: George and Ira Gershwin Award for Lifetime Musical Achievement, UCLA Spring Sing.
- 2004: Ranked 84th in Rolling Stone's list of "100 Greatest Artists of All Time".
- 2009: Honorary Doctorate of Music from Williams College, Williamstown, Massachusetts.
- 2009: Inducted into the North Carolina Music Hall of Fame in 2009.
- 2010: Inducted into the Hit Parade Hall of Fame
- 2010: Received the National Medal of Arts
- 2012: Received the Montréal Jazz Spirit Award
- 2012: Named "Chevalier de l'Ordre des Arts et des Lettres" by the Ministry of Culture & Communication of France.
- 2015: Presidential Medal of Freedom
- 2016: Kennedy Center Honors
- 2022: Honorary doctorate of music from the New England Conservatory, Boston, 2022.
- 2024: The Boston Symphony Orchestra awarded James Taylor the 2024 Tanglewood Medal in recognition of his extraordinary accomplishments as a singer-songwriter and performer as well as his many significant contributions to the BSO and Berkshires communities.

== Discography ==
=== Studio albums ===
- James Taylor (1968)
- Sweet Baby James (1970)
- Mud Slide Slim and the Blue Horizon (1971)
- One Man Dog (1972)
- Walking Man (1974)
- Gorilla (1975)
- In the Pocket (1976)
- JT (1977)
- Flag (1979)
- Dad Loves His Work (1981)
- That's Why I'm Here (1985)
- Never Die Young (1988)
- New Moon Shine (1991)
- Hourglass (1997)
- October Road (2002)
- A Christmas Album (2004)
- James Taylor at Christmas (2006)
- Covers (2008)
- Before This World (2015)
- American Standard (2020)

== See also ==
- Charles H. Taylor (publisher)
- John I. Taylor
