= How Sweet It Is (to Be Loved by You) =

1964 song performed by Marvin Gaye

Single by Marvin Gaye

from the album How Sweet It Is to Be Loved by You
- B-side: "Forever"
- Released: November 4, 1964
- Recorded: July 24, 1964
- Studio: Hitsville U.S.A. (Studio A)
- Genre: Soul
- Length: 2:57
- Label: Tamla
- Songwriter: Holland–Dozier–Holland
- Producers: Brian Holland; Lamont Dozier

Marvin Gaye singles chronology
"What Good Am I Without You" (1964)	"How Sweet It Is (to Be Loved by You)" (1964)	"I'll Be Doggone" (1965)

Audio
- How Sweet It Is (To Be Loved By You) - Marvin Gaye" on YouTube

"How Sweet It Is (to Be Loved by You)" is a song by the American soul singer Marvin Gaye. Motown issued the song as a single on its Tamla label in November 1964, and in January 1965 it appeared as the title track of Gaye's fifth studio album. The song was written in 1964 by the Motown songwriting team of Holland–Dozier–Holland, and produced by Brian Holland and Lamont Dozier.

== Marvin Gaye version ==
Produced by Brian Holland and Lamont Dozier, the song was released as a single in September 1964. It peaked at number six on the US Billboard Hot 100 chart in January 1965 and at number three on US Billboard's R&B Singles chart. Up to that point, it was Gaye's most successful single with record sales exceeding 900,000 copies. The song's personnel includes Marvin Gaye on lead vocals; The Andantes on background vocals; and The Funk Brothers on various instruments, including piano and percussion. Gaye also released a German-language version of the song entitled "Wie Schön Das Ist".

Cash Box described it as "a medium-paced, rollicking chorus-backed ode about a fella who's on top of the world since he met up with Miss Right." AllMusic critic Jason Ankeny described the song as a "radiant pop confection," noting that it was unusual for Gaye in being a "straightforward love song" that doesn't reflect Gaye's usual demons. Ankeny commented on the soulfulness of the song, and particularly noted the piano riff.

Gaye's recording has subsequently been released on many greatest hits albums.

=== Personnel ===
- Marvin Gaye – lead vocals
- The Andantes – backing vocals
- The Funk Brothers – instrumental backing:
  - Mike Terry – baritone saxophone
  - George Fowler – organ
  - Earl Van Dyke – piano
  - James Jamerson – bass
  - Richard "Pistol" Allen – drums
  - Robert White – guitar
  - Jack Ashford – tambourine

== Charts ==
=== Weekly charts ===
Weekly chart performance for "How Sweet It Is (to Be Loved by You)"
Chart (1964–1965)	Peak position
UK (Official Charts Company)	49
US Billboard Hot 100	6
US Hot Rhythm and Blues Singles (Billboard)	3
US Cash Box Top 100	9

=== Year-end charts ===
Year-end chart performance for "How Sweet It Is (to Be Loved by You)"
Chart (1965)	Rank
US Billboard Hot 100	100

== Certifications ==
Region	Certification	Certified units/sales
United Kingdom (BPI)	Silver	200,000^{‡}
^{‡} Sales+streaming figures based on certification alone.

== James Taylor version ==
"How Sweet It Is (to Be Loved by You)"

Single by James Taylor

from the album Gorilla
- B-side: "Sarah Maria"
- Released: June 1975
- Recorded: 1975
- Genre: Soft rock, blue-eyed soul
- Length: 3:33
- Label: Warner Bros.
- Songwriter: Holland–Dozier–Holland
- Producers: Russ Titelman, Lenny Waronker

James Taylor singles chronology
"Walking Man" (1974)	"How Sweet It Is (to Be Loved by You)" (1975)	"Mexico" (1975)

Audio
- "How Sweet It Is (to Be Loved by You)" on YouTube

James Taylor released his version of "How Sweet It Is (to Be Loved by You)" as the lead single from his album Gorilla (1975). Taylor's 1975 single has been the most successful remake of the song to date, hitting number one on the Easy Listening chart and number five on the US Billboard Hot 100 chart. In addition to James Taylor on lead vocals and guitar, other personnel include his then-wife Carly Simon on harmony vocals, Danny Kortchmar on guitar, David Sanborn on saxophone, Clarence McDonald on piano, Fender Rhodes electric piano and possibly ARP String Ensemble, Lee Sklar on bass guitar and both Jim Keltner and Russ Kunkel on drums with Kunkel doubling on tambourine. Author Ian Halperin believes that the song was included on Gorilla as a tribute to Simon, who was then his wife. It was produced by Lenny Waronker and Russ Titelman. After his success with "How Sweet It Is (to Be Loved by You)," Taylor continued to record R&B hits applying his soft rock approach.

Rolling Stone critic Bud Scoppa described Taylor's version as "a relaxed rendition" and considered it to be Taylor's way of acknowledging Gaye as a source of inspiration for Taylor's romantic point of view at the time. Music critic Robert Christgau regarded Taylor's version as a "desecration of Marvin Gaye." Taylor biographer Timothy White described it as "music for the park on Sunday." Cash Box said that the "orchestration is tastefully executed" and that "vocally Taylor puts an oh so mellow coating to this surefire winner."

Taylor's version has been released on many live and compilation albums. These include the compilation albums Greatest Hits (1976), Classic Songs (1990), The Best of James Taylor (2003) and The Essential James Taylor (2013). Live versions have been included on Live and Live at the Beacon Theater.

=== Personnel ===
- James Taylor – vocals, acoustic guitar
- Danny Kortchmar – electric guitar
- Leland Sklar – bass
- Jim Keltner – drums
- Russ Kunkel – drums, tambourine
- Clarence McDonald – piano, Fender Rhodes
- David Sanborn – saxophone
- Carly Simon – backing vocals
- Nick DeCaro – string arrangement

=== Charts ===
==== Weekly charts ====
Chart (1975)	Peak position
Australia KMR	35
Canada RPM Top Singles	1
Canada RPM Adult Contemporary	1
New Zealand	30
US Billboard Hot 100	5
US Adult Contemporary (Billboard)	1
US Cash Box Top 100	7

==== Year-end charts ====
Chart (1975)	Rank
Canada RPM Top Singles	17
US Billboard Hot 100	69
US Cash Box Top 100	98

== Other versions ==
In 1966, Junior Walker & the All Stars released the song as a single, with drums played by James Graves (1941–1967). This recording reached number 3 on the R&B Singles chart and No. 18 on the Billboard Hot 100 chart.

A cover version was included on Karen Dalton's 1971 album In My Own Time.

The song featured regularly in Jerry Garcia Band sets, and his related bands (including a 1972 performance by the Grateful Dead).

An a cappella arrangement of the song written for four voices was composed by Kirby Shaw, with song-writing credit given to both Gaye and Taylor.

Tyrone Davis recorded a version in 1980 that was released as a single from the album I Just Can't Keep On Going. The track was produced by Leo Graham and released on Columbia Records.

The Christian singer group the Gaither Vocal Band released a version on their 2025 album How Sweet It Is. The group later released a live version on the 2026 album How Sweet It Is: LIVE In Concert.
