= Greatest Hits Volume 2 (James Taylor album) =

Greatest Hits (Volume 2)
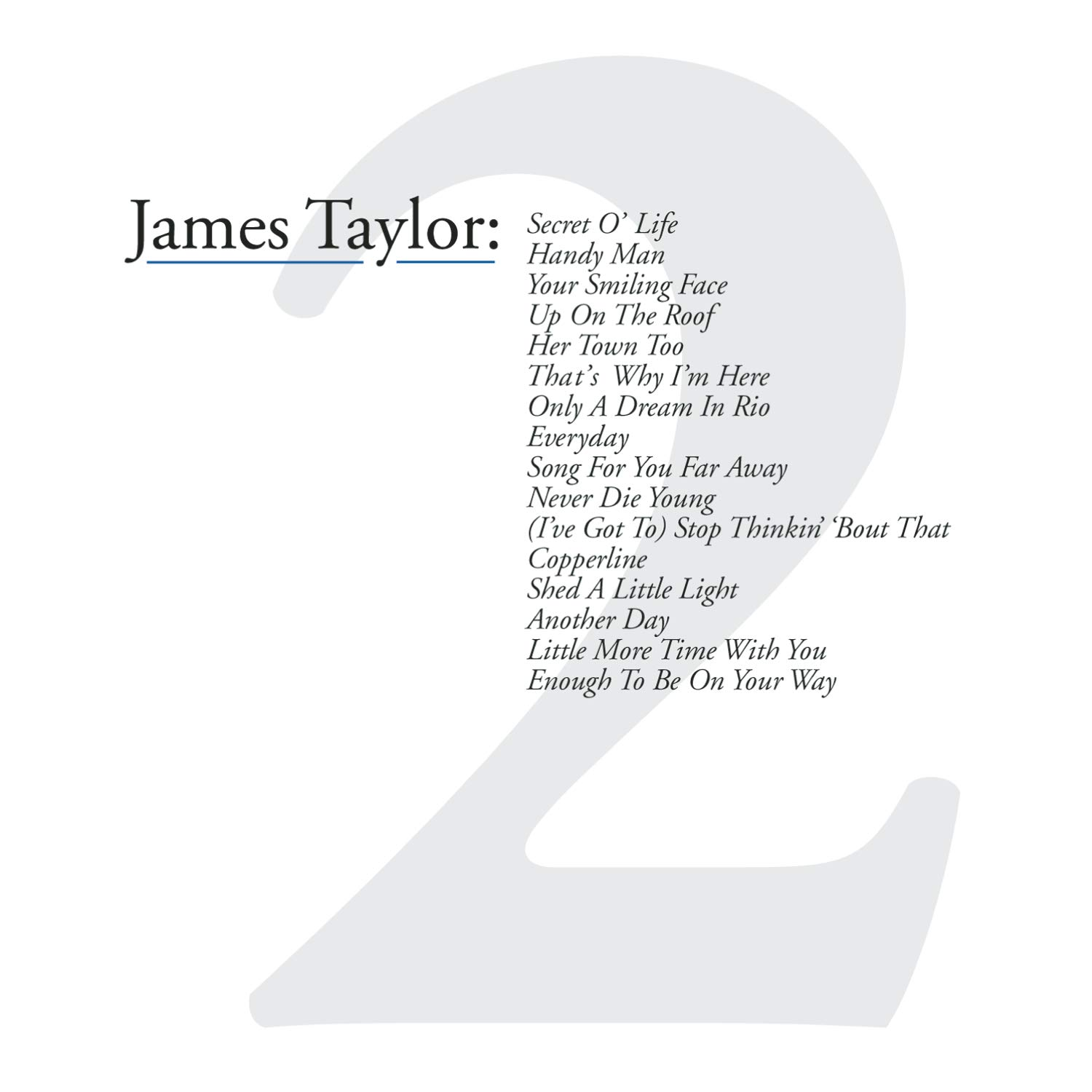

Greatest hits album by James Taylor
- Released: November 7, 2000
- Recorded: March 15, 1977–December 1996
- Genre: Soft rock
- Length: 62:18 (US)
- Label: Columbia
- Producer: Peter Asher; Frank Filipetti; Don Grolnick; Danny Kortchmar; James Taylor

James Taylor chronology
Hourglass (1997)	Greatest Hits (Volume 2) (2000)	October Road (2002)

Professional ratings
Review scores
Source	Rating
AllMusic	4.5/5 stars
The Rolling Stone Album Guide	4/5 stars

Greatest Hits Volume 2 is the third compilation album by singer-songwriter James Taylor released in 2000. It was a follow-up to his first Greatest Hits album released in 1976.

== Track listing ==
All songs written by James Taylor, except where noted.

Greatest Hits Volume 2
No.	Title	Writer(s)	From	Length
1.	"Secret O' Life"		JT, 1977	3:35
2.	"Handy Man"	Otis Blackwell; Jimmy Jones	JT	3:17
3.	"Your Smiling Face"		JT	2:46
4.	"Up on the Roof"	Gerry Goffin; Carole King	Flag, 1979	4:21
5.	"Her Town Too"	JD Souther; Taylor; Waddy Wachtel	Dad Loves His Work, 1981	4:36
6.	"That's Why I'm Here"		That's Why I'm Here, 1985	3:38
7.	"Only a Dream in Rio"		That's Why I'm Here	5:03
8.	"Everyday"	Buddy Holly; Norman Petty	That's Why I'm Here	3:17
9.	"Song for You Far Away"		That's Why I'm Here	2:58
10.	"Never Die Young"		Never Die Young, 1988	4:23
11.	"(I've Got To) Stop Thinkin' 'Bout That"	Danny Kortchmar; Taylor	New Moon Shine, 1991	4:00
12.	"Copperline"	Reynolds Price; Taylor	New Moon Shine	4:19
13.	"Shed a Little Light" (live)		Live, 1993	4:22
14.	"Another Day"		Hourglass, 1997	2:23
15.	"Little More Time with You"		Hourglass	3:52
16.	"Enough to Be on Your Way"		Hourglass	5:28
Total length:				62:18

Note: Japanese editions of the album include a live version of "You Can Close Your Eyes" as a bonus track.

== Personnel ==
- James Taylor – Guitars, vocals, backing vocals
- Dave Bargeron – Trombone
- Randy Brecker – Trumpet, vocals
- Rosemary Butler – Vocals
- Clifford Carter – Organ, synthesizer, piano, keyboards, Fender Rhodes
- Valerie Carter – Vocals
- Luis Conte – Percussion, tambourine, cabasa
- Jerry Douglas – Dobro
- Dan Dugmore – Banjo, guitars, pedal steel
- Elaine Eliaf – Vocals
- Kenia Gould – Vocals
- Don Grolnick – Piano
- Lani Groves – Vocals
- Jimmy Johnson – Bass
- Steve Jordan – Drums
- Danny Kortchmar – Electric guitar
- Leah Kunkel – Vocals (background)
- Russell Kunkel – Drums
- Michael Landau – Guitars
- David Lasley – Vocals
- Tony Levin – Bass
- Yo-Yo Ma – Cello
- Jimmy Maelen – Percussion
- Bobby Mann – Electric guitar
- Kate Markowitz – Vocals
- Rick Marotta – Drums
- Arnold McCuller – Vocals
- Steven Edney – Vocals
- Dr. Clarence McDonald – Piano
- Bob Mintzer – Sax (Tenor)
- Airto Moreira – Percussion
- Mark O'Connor – Fiddle, violin
- Billy Payne – Keyboards
- Ed Rockett – Penny whistle
- David Sanborn – Saxophone
- Rick Shlosser – Drums
- Leland Sklar – Bass
- JD Souther – Vocals
- Carlos Vega – Percussion, drums
- Waddy Wachtel – Guitars
- Deniece Williams – Vocals
- Stevie Wonder – Harmonica
- George Ybara – Assistant
- Zbeto – Vocals
