= James Taylor at Christmas =

Studio album by James Taylor
- Released: October 10, 2006
- Recorded: 2004, 2006
- Genre: Christmas
- Length: 45:49
- Label: Columbia
- Producer: Dave Grusin, Russ Titelman, James Taylor, Charlie Paakkari

James Taylor chronology
James Taylor: A Christmas Album (2004)	James Taylor at Christmas (2006)	One Man Band (2007)

Professional ratings
Review scores
Source	Rating
AllMusic	3/5 stars
Encyclopedia of Popular Music	3/5 stars
The Rolling Stone Album Guide	3/5 stars

James Taylor at Christmas is the 17th studio and second Christmas album by singer-songwriter James Taylor, released by Columbia Records in 2006. It was his last release for Columbia since signing with the label in 1977.

The album is essentially a reissue (with a new title and slightly altered track listing) of James Taylor: A Christmas Album, a limited edition title distributed by Hallmark Cards in 2004. "Have Yourself a Merry Little Christmas," originally issued on Taylor's October Road in 2002, and "River" were not included on the original Hallmark release. Additionally, the original album featured a version of "Deck the Halls" which is not on the standard Columbia CD. (The Barnes & Noble chain, however, issued a version of the new title with "Deck the Halls" included as a bonus track.)

The album was reissued on the UMe label in 2012, with the addition of two tracks. One of them, "Mon Beau Sapin" (a French translation of "O Christmas Tree"), is a new recording and is only available on this album. The other track new to the collection is a version of George Harrison's "Here Comes the Sun" by Taylor and cellist Yo-Yo Ma, which originally appeared on Ma's 2008 holiday album Songs of Joy & Peace.

The album was nominated for Best Traditional Pop Album at the 50th Grammy Awards.

== Track listing (2006 edition) ==
1. "Winter Wonderland" featuring Chris Botti (Felix Bernard, Richard B. Smith) – 3:34
2. "Go Tell It on the Mountain" (Traditional) – 3:42
3. "Santa Claus Is Coming to Town" (J. Fred Coots, Haven Gillespie) – 2:57
4. "Jingle Bells" (Traditional) – 3:52
5. "Baby, It's Cold Outside" featuring Natalie Cole (Frank Loesser) – 4:17
6. "River" (Joni Mitchell) – 3:33
7. "Have Yourself a Merry Little Christmas" (Hugh Martin, Ralph Blane) – 3:24
8. "The Christmas Song (Chestnuts Roasting on an Open Fire)" featuring Toots Thielemans (Mel Tormé, Robert Wells) – 3:52
9. "Some Children See Him" (Wihla Hutson, Alfred Burt) – 4:37
10. "Who Comes This Night" (Dave Grusin, Sally Stevens) – 4:11
11. "In the Bleak Midwinter" (Traditional) – 4:12
12. "Auld Lang Syne" (Traditional) – 3:38

== Track listing (2012 edition) ==
1. "Winter Wonderland" featuring Chris Botti (Felix Bernard, Richard B. Smith) - 3:34
2. "Go Tell It on the Mountain" (Traditional) - 3:42
3. "Santa Claus Is Coming to Town" (J. Fred Coots, Haven Gillespie) - 2:57
4. "Jingle Bells" (Traditional) - 3:52
5. "Baby, It's Cold Outside" featuring Natalie Cole (Frank Loesser) - 4:17
6. "River" (Joni Mitchell) - 3:33
7. "Here Comes the Sun" featuring Yo-Yo Ma (George Harrison) - 2:50
8. "Have Yourself a Merry Little Christmas" (Hugh Martin, Ralph Blane) - 3:24
9. "Some Children See Him" (Wihla Hutson, Alfred Burt) - 4:37
10. "Mon Beau Sapin" (Traditional) - 3:08
11. "The Christmas Song (Chestnuts Roasting on an Open Fire)" featuring Toots Thielemans (Mel Tormé, Robert Wells) - 3:52
12. "Who Comes This Night" (Dave Grusin, Sally Stevens) - 4:11
13. "In the Bleak Midwinter" (Traditional) - 4:12
14. "Auld Lang Syne" (Traditional) - 3:38

== Personnel ==
- James Taylor – lead and backing vocals, guitars (2, 4–7, 10, 14)
- Dave Grusin – acoustic piano (1–7, 9, 12, 13, 14), arrangements (1–5, 9–14), celesta (11, 12)
- Larry Goldings – melodica (2, 13), organ (4), acoustic piano (6, 8, 10, 11), accordion (10), glockenspiel (10), harmonica (13, 14), harmonium (14)
- Clifford Carter – synthesizers (8)
- John Pizzarelli – guitars (1, 3, 5, 8, 11, 14)
- George Doering – guitars (2, 4, 12, 13)
- Michael Landau – guitars (2, 4, 13, 14)
- Dave Carpenter – bass (1, 3, 5, 6, 12, 12, 14)
- Jimmy Johnson – bass (2, 4, 8, 10, 13)
- Vinnie Colaiuta – drums (1–5, 11, 13, 14)
- Steve Gadd – drums (8, 10)
- Luis Conte – percussion (2, 4, 5, 12)
- Chris Botti – trumpet (1)
- Yo-Yo Ma – cello (7)
- Toots Thielemans – harmonica (11)
- David Lasley – backing vocals (1, 2, 9, 12)
- Kate Markowitz – backing vocals (1, 2, 9, 12)
- Arnold McCuller – backing vocals (1, 2, 9, 12)
- Natalie Cole – lead vocals (5)

Production

- Dave Grusin – producer (1–5, 9–14)
- Charlie Paakkari – producer (6), assistant engineer
- James Taylor – producer (6)
- Dave O'Donnell – producer, recording and mixing (7, 10)
- Russ Titelman – producer (8)
- Don Murray – recording and mixing (1–6, 9, 11–14)
- Doug Sax – mastering
- Sangwook Nam – mastering
- The Mastering Lab (Hollywood, California) – mastering location
- Christopher Austopchuk – art direction, design
- David Bett – art direction, design
- Timothy White – photography

== Charts ==
=== Weekly charts ===
Chart (2006)	Peak position
US Billboard 200	16
US Top Holiday Albums (Billboard)	3

=== Year-end charts ===
Chart (2007)	Position
US Billboard 200	109
