= A Christmas Album (James Taylor album) =

Studio album by James Taylor
- Released: November 2004
- Recorded: March – April 2004
- Studio: Capitol (Hollywood)
- Genres: Christmas, jazz
- Label: Hallmark
- Producer: Dave Grusin

James Taylor chronology
The Best of James Taylor (2003)	A Christmas Album (2004)	James Taylor at Christmas (2006)

A Christmas Album is the first Christmas album by American singer-songwriter James Taylor released on a limited-edition basis in 2004, with distribution through Hallmark stores. The albums were also not carried by all Hallmark Cards stockists.

== Track listing ==
1. "Winter Wonderland" with Chris Botti (Dick Smith, Felix Bernard) – 3:36
2. "Go Tell It on the Mountain" (Traditional) – 3:48
3. "In the Bleak Midwinter" (Traditional) – 4:18
4. "Baby, It's Cold Outside" with Natalie Cole (Frank Loesser) – 4:19
5. "Santa Claus Is Coming to Town" (Haven Gillespie, John Frederick Coots) – 2:58
6. "Jingle Bells" (Traditional) – 3:55
7. "The Christmas Song (Chestnuts Roasting on an Open Fire)" with Toots Thielemans (Mel Tormé, Robert Wells) – 3:54
8. "Deck the Halls" (Traditional) – 2:51
9. "Some Children See Him" (Alfred Burt, Wihla Hutson) – 4:41
10. "Who Comes This Night" (Dave Grusin, Sally Stevens) – 4:17
11. "Auld Lang Syne" (Traditional) – 3:41

The album originally came with an online code that could be used to download an outtake from the sessions, a cover of Joni Mitchell's "River". In 2006, Taylor's regular label, Columbia Records, reissued the album under a new title (James Taylor at Christmas) and cover. This new version also altered the track listing, with "Deck the Halls" removed and two other songs ("Have Yourself a Merry Little Christmas" and the aforementioned cover of "River") added.

== Personnel ==
- James Taylor – lead vocals, guitars (2, 6, 8, 11), arrangements (2, 3, 6, 8)
- Dave Grusin – arrangements, acoustic piano (1, 4–6, 9–11), celesta (7, 10)
- Larry Goldings – melodica (2, 3, 11), harmonium (3, 8, 11), organ (6), acoustic piano (7)
- John Pizzarelli – guitars (1, 5, 7, 11)
- George Doering – guitars (2–4, 6, 10)
- Michael Landau – guitars (2–4, 6, 8, 11)
- Dave Carpenter – bass (1, 5, 7, 10, 11)
- Jimmy Johnson – bass (2–4, 6)
- Vinnie Colaiuta – drums (1–7, 11)
- Luis Conte – percussion (2, 4, 6, 10)
- Michael Fisher – percussion (8)
- Ralph Williams – bass clarinet (1)
- Gary Gray – clarinet (1)
- Bill Liston – clarinet (1)
- Dan Higgins – flute (1)
- Phil Ayling – English horn (1), oboe (1)
- Chris Botti – trumpet (1)
- Toots Thielemans – harmonica (7)
- David Lasley – backing vocals (1, 2, 8, 10)
- Kate Markowitz – backing vocals (1, 2, 8, 10)
- Arnold McCuller – backing vocals (1, 2, 8, 10)
- Natalie Cole – lead vocals (4)

Strings (1–5, 7, 9, 10)

- Ralph Morrison – concertmaster
- Steve Erdody, Paula Hochhalter and Cecilia Tsan – cello
- Edward Mears – contrabass
- Karen Elaine Bakunin, Brian Dembow, Marlow Fisher, Roland Kato and Vicki Miskolczy – viola
- Jackie Brand, Bruce Dukov, Julie Gigante, Alan Grunfield, Clayton Haslop, Tamara Hatwan, Natalie Leggett, Ralph Morrison, Claudia Parducci, Sara Parkins, Katia Popov, Josefina Vergara, Margaret Wooten and Kenneth Yerke – violin

=== Production ===
- Dave Grusin – producer, liner notes
- Don Murray – recording, mixing
- Charlie Paakkari – assistant engineer
- Robert Vosgien – mastering at Capitol Mastering (Hollywood, California).
- Gary Borman – management
- Barbara Rose Granatt – management
- James Taylor – liner notes
