= Live (James Taylor album) =

Live album by James Taylor
- Released: August 10, 1993
- Recorded: November 1992
- Genre: Rock
- Length: 123:15
- Label: Columbia
- Producer: Don Grolnick; George Massenburg

James Taylor chronology
New Moon Shine (1991)	Live (1993)	Hourglass (1997)

Professional ratings
Review scores
Source	Rating
AllMusic	4/5 stars
Encyclopedia of Popular Music	4/5 stars
MusicHound	3.5/5
The Rolling Stone Album Guide	3/5 stars

Live (stylised as (LIVE)) is the first live album by singer-songwriter James Taylor released on August 10, 1993, by Columbia Records. The double album presents selections from 14 shows during a November 1992 tour. In the US, Live peaked at number 20 on the Billboard 200 chart and has sold more than one million copies, being certified 2× platinum by the RIAA.

A single-album CD of highlights of the double album was also released, titled Best Live. There are two different versions of this album; a 17-track version was released in 1993, and a shorter 12-track version on June 21, 1994. On digital distributors such as Spotify and iTunes, many of the verbal introductions that were present in the original CD have been cut.

== Track listing ==
All songs by James Taylor except where noted.

Disc one

1. "Sweet Baby James" – 4:13
2. "Traffic Jam" – 2:10
3. "Handy Man" (Otis Blackwell, Jimmy Jones) – 3:31
4. "Your Smiling Face" – 3:03
5. "Secret O' Life" – 3:45
6. "Shed a Little Light" – 4:32
7. "Everybody Has the Blues" – 2:33
8. "Steamroller Blues" – 5:30
9. "Mexico" – 3:32
10. "Millworker" – 4:25
11. "Country Road" – 5:44
12. "Fire and Rain" – 4:44
13. "Shower the People" – 4:43
14. "How Sweet It Is (To Be Loved by You)" (Holland, Dozier, Holland) – 7:29
15. "New Hymn" (Reynolds Price, Taylor) – 3:00

Disc two

1. "Walking Man" – 4:35
2. "Riding on a Railroad" – 2:41
3. "Something in the Way She Moves" – 3:59
4. "Sun on the Moon" – 3:54
5. "Up on the Roof" (Gerry Goffin, Carole King) – 4:10
6. "Don't Let Me Be Lonely Tonight" – 3:37
7. "She Thinks I Still Care" (Dickey Lee, Steve Duffy) – 3:28
8. "Copperline" (R. Price, Taylor) – 4:43
9. "Slap Leather" – 2:11
10. "Only One" – 4:41
11. "You Make It Easy" – 5:05
12. "Carolina in My Mind" – 5:04
13. "I Will Follow" – 4:14
14. "You've Got a Friend" (King) – 5:09
15. "That Lonesome Road (Don Grolnick, Taylor) – 2:46

=== Best Live (17 track) ===
1. "Sweet Baby James" – 4:11
2. "Handy Man" (Blackwell, Jones) – 3:34
3. "Your Smiling Face" – 2:51
4. "Steamroller Blues" – 5:36
5. "Mexico" – 3:17
6. "Walking Man" – 4:08
7. "Country Road" – 5:44
8. "Fire and Rain" – 4:33
9. "How Sweet It Is (To Be Loved By You)" (Holland, Dozier, Holland) – 6:57
10. "Riding on a Railroad" – 2:42
11. "Something in the Way She Moves" – 3:59
12. "Sun on the Moon" – 3:51
13. "Up on the Roof" (Goffin, King) – 4:13
14. "Copperline" (Price, Taylor) – 4:40
15. "Slap Leather" – 2:14
16. "You've Got a Friend" (King) – 5:09
17. "That Lonesome Road" (Grolnick, Taylor) – 2:46

=== Best Live (12 track) ===
1. "Sweet Baby James" – 4:13
2. "Handy Man" (Blackwell, Jones) – 3:34
3. "Your Smiling Face" – 2:53
4. "Shed a Little Light" – 4:17
5. "Steamroller Blues" – 5:24
6. "Mexico" – 3:15
7. "Walking Man" – 4:23
8. "Country Road" – 5:38
9. "Fire and Rain" – 4:39
10. "How Sweet It Is (To Be Loved By You)" (Holland, Dozier, Holland) – 6:58
11. "Don't Let Me Be Lonely Tonight" – 3:10
12. "Shower the People" – 5:12

== Personnel ==
- James Taylor – lead vocals, acoustic guitar
- Don Grolnick – acoustic piano
- Clifford Carter – keyboards
- Michael Landau – electric guitars
- Jimmy Johnson – bass guitar
- Carlos Vega – drums
- Valerie Carter – backing vocals
- David Lasley – backing vocals
- Kate Markowitz – backing vocals
- Arnold McCuller – backing vocals

=== Production ===
Studio credits

- Producers – Don Grolnick and George Massenburg
- Production co-ordination – Barbara Moutenot and Ivy Skoff
- Recorded by Nathaniel Kunkel with John Godenzi and Randy Hutson
- Additional engineers – Rail Rogut and Michael White
- Assistant engineer – Rail Rogut
- Mixed by George Massenburg at Electric Lady Studios (New York, NY) and Record One (Los Angeles, CA).
- Mastered by Doug Sax and Gavin Lurssen at The Mastering Lab (Hollywood, CA).

Live credits

- House sound engineer – John Godenzi
- Monitor engineer – Randy Hutson
- Technicians – Gary Epstein and Mark Hughes

Additional credits

- Art direction – Stephanie Mauer
- Photography – Andrew Brucker
- Liner notes – Peter Asher
- Management – Peter Asher Management
