= Hard Times (James Taylor song) =

- Dutch cover

Single by James Taylor

from the album Dad Loves His Work
- B-side: "Summer's Here"
- Released: May 1981
- Studio: Record One, Los Angeles
- Genre: Soft rock
- Length: 3:10
- Label: Columbia
- Songwriter: James Taylor
- Producer: Peter Asher

James Taylor singles chronology
"Her Town Too" (1981)	"Hard Times" (1981)	"Everyday" (1985)

"Hard Times" is a song written by James Taylor. It first appeared on his 1981 album Dad Loves His Work. It was also released as a single, as the follow-up to the top-20 hit "Her Town Too". It reached No. 72 on the Billboard Hot 100 and No. 23 on the Billboard Adult Contemporary chart. The single's B-side, "Summer's Here," performed similarly on the Adult Contemporary chart, peaking at #25.

== Lyrics and music ==
Like several other songs from Dad Loves His Work, "Hard Times" was influenced by the impending breakup of Taylor's marriage to Carly Simon. Fans heard the song as a message that the marriage was about to end. According to Rolling Stone critic Don Shewey, it "explores marriage on the rocks." The lyrics describe the difficulty for an "angry man" and a "hungry woman" to stay together, and hope that the couple can stop "driving each other crazy." They lament the way the pair hurt each other. The singer acknowledges that he can be challenging to love. Taylor biographer Mark Robowsky describes the song's groove as "easygoing." But he also claims that the song's refrain of "We've got to hold on, got to hold on" was a good hook, those lyrics were also false as by that time Taylor had already decided he did not want to hold on to his marriage with Simon. The song has an R&B feel, which musicologist James Perone partially attributes to backing singers David Lasley and Arnold McCuller.

== Reception ==
AllMusic critic William Ruhlmann regarded both "Hard Times" and "Summer's Here" among the better songs on Dad Loves His Work, helping Taylor bounce back from his previous "spotty" album Flag. Billboard said it is "in the same category" as "Her Town Too", "with a sprighly midtempo arrangement and Taylor's trademarked vocals" and said that the "backing vocals make the listener want to sing along." Record World described the song as "pretty pop A/C fare" and said that "James works his attractive tenor effectively on cute chorus trades with David Lasley and Arnold McCuller." Musician, Player, and Listener described it as sounding "more personal - especially as regards marital problems - than anything [Taylor] committed to wax in years." Michigan Daily critic Ari Roth stated that "Hard Times" "assert[s] a dependency and will to achievement that Taylor has never previously articulated." Michael Hochandel of Schenectady Gazette reported that "Hard Times" received as much applause in 1981 live performances as Taylor's classics.

"Hard Times" was chosen for inclusion in the soundtrack to the 2002 PBS documentary Freedom: A History of Us. Allmusic reviewer William Ruhlmann lamented the song's exclusion from the 2000 compilation album Greatest Hits Volume 2.

== Personnel ==
- James Taylor – lead vocals
- Waddy Wachtel – electric guitar, guitar solo
- Dan Dugmore - electric guitar
- Leland Sklar – bass guitar
- Don Grolnick – piano, organ
- Rick Marotta – drums, congas
- Bill Cuomo – synthesizers
- David Lasley, Arnold McCuller – background vocals

== "Summer's Here" ==
The B-side of the "Hard Times" single, "Summer's Here" also performed well on the Adult Contemporary chart, peaking at #25. "Summer's Here" entered the Adult Contemporary chart on August 1, 1981, while "Hard Times" was still in the Top 50. "Summer's Here" performed even better on the Canadian Adult Contemporary chart, reaching #12.

Perone describes the theme of "Summer's Here" as simply being a celebration of summer. Montreal Gazette critic John Griffin similarly described the song as "simply a goofy ode to 'my favorite time of year.'" Although the character in the song states that summer is his favorite season, Taylor has claimed that this is just that character speaking, and that Taylor's own favorite season is the Fall and his favorite month is October. The lyrics to "Summer's Here" incorporate a common trope in Taylor's songs, that of the open sea.

Perone describes the music as being Caribbean-style, while Schenectady Gazette critic Michael Hochandel described the music as reggae. Musician, Player, and Listener similarly described it as having Caribbean influence, calling it a "momentary ray of sunshine." Taylor biographer Timothy White called the song "infectious." Terry Hazlet of the Observer-Reporter rated "Summer's Here" as the best song on Dad Loves His Work and "the closest Taylor came to his real roots," albeit because he considered it "simplistic" and because the focus on objects such as sandals, beer and hats "make the human element," which he found lacking on other songs on the album, "unnecessary." Perone rates it as "not one of Taylor's more lyrically or musically substantial works" but states that it "serves as a break from some of the darker and more serious lyrics on Dad Loves His Work."

== Personnel ==
- James Taylor – lead vocals, acoustic guitar
- Waddy Wachtel, Dan Dugmore – guitars
- Leland Sklar – bass guitar
- Rick Marotta – drums, timbales
- Don Grolnick – electric piano, organ
- Greg "Fingers" Taylor – harmonica
- Peter Asher – shaker
