= The Way It Is (Valerie Carter album) =

Studio album by Valerie Carter
- Released: July 2, 1996
- Genre: Rock
- Length: 40:52
- Label: Pony Canyon
- Producer: Eddy Offord

Valerie Carter chronology
Wild Child (1978)	The Way It Is (1996)	Find a River (EP) (1998)

Professional ratings
Review scores
Source	Rating
AllMusic	3/5 stars

The Way It Is is Valerie Carter's third solo album. This album features background vocals by James Taylor, Linda Ronstadt, Jackson Browne, Lyle Lovett, Phoebe Snow, David Lasley, Arnold McCuller and Kate Markowitz.

== Critical reception ==
Rob Caldwell of AllMusic gives the album 3 out of 5 stars and writes, "Following the pattern of her debut, it featured a fine selection of songs and a fine array of guest performers."

Charles Donovan of Pop Matters had this to say of the album, "Wild Child marked the end of Carter's time with Columbia. Busy with backing vocals and some songwriting here and there in the 1980s, she wouldn't re-emerge as a solo artist until 1996, when she cut The Way It Is for the Japanese Pony Canyon label. It was a tremendous return."

== Track listing ==
No.	Title	Writer(s)	Length
1.	"The Way It Is"	Valerie Carter; Kevin Hunter; Mark Goldenberg	4:01
2.	"Love Needs a Heart"	Valerie Carter; Jackson Browne; Lowell George	3:43
3.	"Sea of Stars"	Valerie Carter; Kevin Hunter; Mark Goldenberg	3:43
4.	"Into the Mystic"	Van Morrison	4:08
5.	"Birds"	Neil Young	3:42
6.	"Who Is She (And What Is She to You)"	Bill Withers; Stan McKenny	3:29
7.	"I Say Amen"	Valerie Carter; Kathy Kurasch; Tom Snow	3:51
8.	"When the Blues Come to Call"	Tom Snow	4:32
9.	"I Wonder Why"	Tom Snow	4:38
10.	"Whistle Down the Wind"	Tom Waits	5:05
Total length:			40:52

Bonus track on some releases
No.	Title	Writer(s)	Length
11.	"That's The Way of the World"	Maurice White; Verdine White; Charles Stepney	6:11

1996 Japanese release
No.	Title	Writer(s)	Length
1.	"The Way It Is"	Valerie Carter; Kevin Hunter; Mark Goldenberg	4:01
2.	"Love Needs a Heart"	Valerie Carter; Jackson Browne; Lowell George	3:43
3.	"That's The Way of the World"	Maurice White; Verdine White; Charles Stepney	6:11
4.	"Blessing in Disguise"	Tom Snow	3:36
5.	"Into the Mystic"	Van Morrison	4:08
6.	"Birds"	Neil Young	3:42
7.	"I Say Amen"	Valerie Carter; Kathy Kurasch; Tom Snow	3:51
8.	"Who Is She (And What Is She to You)"	Bill Withers; Stan McKenny	3:29
9.	"When the Blues Come to Call"	Tom Snow	4:32
10.	"I Wonder Why"	Tom Snow	4:38
11.	"Sea of Stars"	Valerie Carter; Kevin Hunter; Mark Goldenberg	3:43
12.	"Whistle Down the Wind"	Tom Waits	5:05
Total length:			50:39

Track information verified from the album's liner notes and cross referenced with 45 Worlds.

== Personnel ==
- Valerie Carter - lead vocals
- Arnold McCuller, David Lasley, Edwin McCain, Jackson Browne, James Taylor, Kate Markowitz, Linda Ronstadt, Lyle Lovett, Phoebe Snow, Sweet Pea Atkinson - backing vocals
- Kevin McCormick - bass
- Mauricio Lewak - drums
- James Harrah - guitar
- Mark Goldenberg - guitar, keyboards, accordion
- Debra Dobkin - percussion
- Scott Plunkett - piano, keyboards
- Joe Sublette - saxophone
- Novi Novog - viola

Technical

- Producer – Mark Goldenberg
- Producer, Recorded By, Mixed By – Eddy Offord

Personnel information retrieved from Discogs.
