= Hourglass (James Taylor album) =

1997 album

Studio album by James Taylor
- Released: May 20, 1997
- Recorded: May–October 1996
- Studio: Chalker's Creek, Martha's Vineyard, Massachusetts; Westlake Audio, West Hollywood, California; Right Track Studios, New York City
- Length: 54:51
- Label: Columbia
- Producer: Frank Filipetti; James Taylor

James Taylor chronology
Live (1993)	Hourglass (1997)	Greatest Hits Volume 2 (2000)

Singles from Hourglass
- 1. "Little More Time with You" Released: 1997; 2. "Line 'Em Up" Released: 1998

Professional ratings
Review scores
Source	Rating
AllMusic	3/5 stars
Encyclopedia of Popular Music	3/5 stars
MusicHound	3.5/5
Rolling Stone	3.5/5 stars
The Rolling Stone Album Guide	3/5 stars

Hourglass is the fourteenth studio album by singer-songwriter James Taylor released in 1997. It was his first studio album in six years since 1991's New Moon Shine. It was a huge commercial success, reaching No. 9 on the Billboard 200, his first Top 10 album in sixteen years and also provided a big adult contemporary hit, "Little More Time With You".

The album also gave Taylor his first Grammy since JT, when he was honored with Best Pop Album in 1998. The album also won producer/engineer Frank Filipetti a Grammy that year for Best Engineered Album. The majority of the album was recorded using a Yamaha O2R mixer and three Tascam DA-88 multitrack recorders, which were early digital devices not typically used by top level artists, as most major label records were still being recorded to analog tape at that time.

The album was dedicated to Don Grolnick who was a frequent collaborator with Taylor and who died during the Hourglass sessions in 1996 due to Non-Hodgkin's lymphoma.

== Background ==
Hourglass was an introspective album with lyrics that focused largely on Taylor's troubled past and family. "Jump Up Behind Me" paid tribute to his father's rescue of him after the Flying Machine days, and the long drive from New York City back to his home in Chapel Hill. "Enough to Be On Your Way" was inspired by the alcoholism-related death of his brother Alex earlier in the decade. The themes were also inspired by Taylor's divorce from actress Kathryn Walker, which took place in 1996. Rolling Stone found that "one of the themes of this record is disbelief", while Taylor told the magazine that it was "spirituals for agnostics."

== Track listing ==
All songs by James Taylor unless otherwise noted.

1. "Line 'Em Up" – 4:44
2. "Enough to Be on Your Way" – 5:29
3. "Little More Time with You" – 3:52
4. "Gaia" – 5:31
5. "Ananas" – 5:44
6. "Jump Up Behind Me" – 3:30
7. "Another Day" – 2:23
8. "Up Er Mei" – 3:49
9. "Up from Your Life" – 5:17
10. "Yellow and Rose" – 4:55
11. "Boatman" (Livingston Taylor, M. Taylor) – 3:59
12. "Walking My Baby Back Home" (Fred E. Ahlert, Roy Turk) – 3:12
13. "Hangnail" (also known as "Money O Money") – 2:21 [hidden track]

== Personnel ==
- James Taylor – lead vocals, acoustic guitar, harmonica (10)
- Clifford Carter – keyboards
- Bob Mann – guitars
- Dan Dugmore – pedal steel guitar (10, 11)
- Ross Traut – high-strung guitar (11)
- Jimmy Johnson – bass guitar (1–3, 5–8, 10–12)
- Edgar Meyer – cello arrangements (2, 7), acoustic bass (4, 9)
- Carlos Vega – drums, percussion
- Mark O'Connor – fiddle (2)
- Yo-Yo Ma – cello (2, 7)
- Stanley Silverman – cello arrangements (2, 7)
- Edwin Rockett – penny whistle (2)
- Stevie Wonder – harmonica (3)
- Branford Marsalis – soprano saxophone (4), alto saxophone (9)
- Michael Brecker – tenor saxophone (5), EWI (6)
- Rob Mounsey – horn arrangements (5)
- Valerie Carter – backing vocals
- David Lasley – backing vocals
- Kate Markowitz – backing vocals
- Arnold McCuller – backing vocals
- Sting – backing vocals (6)
- Jill Dell'Abate – backing vocals (8)
- Shawn Colvin – backing vocals (10)

== Production ==
- Producers – Frank Filipetti and James Taylor
- Associate Producer – Jill Dell'Abate
- Production Assistant – Ted Cammann
- Engineered and Mixed by Frank Filipetti
- Assistant Engineers – Tim Gerron and Pete Karam
- Mix Assistant – Pete Karam
- Technical Support – John Morrison
- Mastered by Ted Jensen at Sterling Sound (New York, NY).
- Art Direction – Stephanie Mauer
- Design – Chris Quinn
- Photography – Herb Ritts
- Management – Cathy Kerr for PAM Artist Management.

== Charts ==
=== Weekly charts ===
Weekly chart performance for Hourglass
Chart (1997)	Peak position
Australian Albums (ARIA)	68
Norwegian Albums (VG-lista)	38
Scottish Albums (OCC)	67
UK Albums (OCC)	46
US Billboard 200	9

=== Year-end charts ===
Year-end chart performance for Hourglass
Chart (1997)	Position
US Billboard 200	111

== Certifications ==
Certifications for Hourglass
Region	Certification	Certified units/sales
United Kingdom (BPI)	Silver	60,000^{‡}
United States (RIAA)	Platinum	1,000,000^{^}
^{^} Shipments figures based on certification alone.^{‡} Sales+streaming figures based on certification alone.
