= Howdy Moon =

Studio album by Howdy Moon
- Released: 1974
- Studio: Sunset Sound Recorders, Sound Labs and Clover Recorders, Hollywood, California
- Genre: Folk rock
- Length: 32:42
- Label: A&M
- Producer: Lowell George, Robert Appère, Michael James Jackson

Professional ratings
Review scores
| Source | Rating |
|---|---|
| AllMusic | 2.5/5 stars |

Howdy Moon was the sole album by the band Howdy Moon, released in 1974. The band included Valerie Carter, Richard Hovey and Jon Lind. Howdy Moon was formed on the ashes of another group, RJ Fox, a vocal trio in the genre of Crosby, Stills & Nash of which Richard Hovey was the leader. In 1972 Valerie Carter also began working with the group, however, broke up shortly after. The two artists decide to continue their collaboration also involving singer-songwriter Jon Lind and giving life to Howdy Moon.

They were signed by A&M Records and played at The Troubadour. Many of the musicians from the band Little Feat are featured on the album.

After Howdy Moon disbanded, Lowell George produced Just a Stone's Throw Away, Valerie Carter's first solo album. The song "Cook With Honey", written by Carter, was also a minor hit for Judy Collins.

== Track listing ==
1. "Lovelight" (Richard Hovey) - 2:53
2. "Cheyenne Autumn" (Jon Lind) - 3:14
3. "I'm Alone" (Valerie Carter, Richard Hovey) - 3:18
4. "Nora Lee" (Eric Eisner) - 3:39
5. "Runaway" (Richard Hovey) - 2:35
6. "And You Never Knew" (Ed Brandon, Valerie Carter) - 3:45
7. "Machine" (Richard Hovey) - 2:28
8. "Cook With Honey" (Valerie Carter) - 4:16
9. "For Tonight" (Richard Hovey) - 3:59
10. "Mill Stream" (Jon Lind, Francine Tacker) - 2:35

== Personnel ==
Howdy Moon

- Valerie Carter - vocals
- Richard Hovey - guitar, acoustic guitar, vocals
- Jon Lind - guitar, acoustic guitar, vocals

with:

- Van Dyke Parks - piano
- John Sebastian - autoharp, harmonica
- Lowell George - flute, electric guitar, Moog synthesizer, slide guitar, backing vocals
- Sam Clayton - congas
- Roy Estrada - bass guitar
- Wilton Felder - bass guitar
- David Parlato - bass guitar
- Andrew Gold - electric guitar
- Arthur Adams - electric guitar
- Dennis Budimir - acoustic and electric guitar
- Bobbye Hall - congas
- Richie Hayward - drums
- Milt Holland - congas, percussion
- Jim Keltner - drums
- Sneaky Pete Kleinow - pedal steel
- Gary Mallaber - drums
- David Paich - arranger, string arrangements
- Bill Payne - Moog synthesizer, piano
- Gordon DeWitty - electric piano
- Chuck Rainey - bass guitar
- Mike Utley - organ
- Fred White - drums
- John Bergamo - tabla

Technical

- Brian Dall'Armi, Ric Tarantini, Tommy Vicari - engineer
- John Haeny - mixing
