= Summer Is Over =

Summer Is Over may refer to:

- "Summer Is Over" (Dusty Springfield song), 1964
- Summer Is Over (film), 1963 Soviet comedy film
- "Summer Is Over" (KSI song), 2022
- Summer's Over, Jordana and TV Girl album, 2021

== See also ==
- "Summers Over Interlude", song by Drake on the 2016 album Views
- "Summer's Here", song by James Taylor, 1981
- Summer's Gone (disambiguation)
