= Millwork (disambiguation) =

Millwork is a building material.

It may also refer to:

- Millwork (machinery), part of mechanical power systems
- Millwork (song), a song by James Taylor
