= Summer's Gone (disambiguation) =

"Summer's Gone" is a 1984 song by The Kinks.

It may also refer to:

- Summer's Gone, a 2012 album by Odesza
- "Summer's Gone", a 1960 single by Paul Anka
- "Summer's Gone", a song by the Beach Boys from the 2012 album That's Why God Made the Radio
- "Summer's Gone", a song by Feeder from the 2002 album Comfort in Sound
- "Summer's Gone", a song by MGK and Trippie Redd from the 2024 album Genre: Sadboy

== See also ==
- "Summer Gone", 1999 novel by David Macfarlane
- "Summer's Here", song by James Taylor, 1981
- Summer Is Over (disambiguation)
