= Kate Markowitz =

American singer (born 1956)

Catherine Judith Markowitz (born 28 April 1956) is an American singer-songwriter known as a backup singer who has recorded and performed with a number of singers, most notably James Taylor but also Willy DeVille, Shawn Colvin, Mylène Farmer, Don Henley, Billy Joel, k.d. lang, Lyle Lovett, Graham Nash, Randy Newman, Warren Zevon, Joe Pizzulo, Sergio Mendes and John Kaizan Neptune. She is the daughter of the late film and television soundtrack composer Richard Markowitz.

Markowitz had a platinum-selling single in Germany in 1991 under the pseudonym Kate Yanai. The single began as a Bacardi Rum jingle in 1988 that she recorded for the European market. The jingle was so popular that she was asked to transform it into a song about "summer love" rather than rum. She co-wrote the lyrics and recorded it (with Arnold McCuller, David Lasley and Valerie Carter on backing vocals) under the pseudonym Kate Yanai. Called "Bacardi Feeling (Summer Dreamin')," it went to Number 1 within two weeks in Germany, where it stayed for seven weeks, selling well over 500,000 copies. In 1994 she released a second single "Cry, Cry Louise" which reached number 61 in Germany.

In 2003 she produced her first album, Map of the World, on which she wrote or co-wrote a number of the songs.

== Discography ==
=== Solo albums ===
- Map of the World — 2003

=== Selected credits ===
- Abraham Laboriel — Dear Friends — (1993)
- Anna Vissi — Everything I Am — (2001)
- Arnold McCuller:
  - You Can't Go Back — (1999)
  - Exception to the Rule — (2000)
  - Back To Front — (2002)
- Aselin Debison — Sweet Is the Melody — (2002)
- Bill Withers — Lean on Me: The Best of Bill Withers — (1994)
- Billy Joel
- Boz Scaggs — Other Roads — (1988)
- Carol Weisman — Language of Love — (2003)
- Cher — Love Hurts— (1991)
- Clifford Carter — Walkin' into the Sun — (1993)
- Connie Kaldor — Moonlight Grocery — (1984)
- Laura Branigan — Laura Branigan — (1990)
- Dan Fogelberg
- Diana Ross:
  - The Force Behind the Power — (1991)
  - Gift of Love — (2000)
  - Motown Anthology — (2001)
  - I Love You — (2006)
- Don Grusin:
  - Don Grusin — (1983)
  - No Borders — (1992)
  - Zephyr — (1991)
  - 10k-La — (1980)
  - Raven — (1990)
- Don Henley
- Dori Caymmi:
  - Brazilian Serenata — (1988)
  - Kicking Cans — (1993)
- Eddy Mitchell — Frenchy — (2003)
- Eric Burdon:
  - Comeback — (1982)
  - Eric Burdon Unreleased — (1982)
  - Wicked Man — (1988)
  - Crawling King Snake — (1994)
  - Misunderstood — (1995)
  - Soldier of Fortune — (1997)
  - Burdon Tracks — (1998)
- Ernie Watts — Sanctuary — (1986)
- James Taylor:
  - New Moon Shine — (1991)
  - (LIVE) — (1993)
  - (Best LIVE) — (1994)
  - Hourglass — (1997)
  - Greatest Hits Volume 2 — (2000)
  - October Road — (2002)
  - Covers — (2008)
  - Before This World — (2015)
- Johnny Mathis — Right from the Heart — (1985)
- Julia Fordham — Swept — (1991)
- Julie Brown — Trapped in the Body of a White Girl — (1987)
- k.d. lang — Live by Request — (2001)
- Kenny Loggins
- Lee Ritenour:
  - Color Rit — (1989)
  - World of Brazil — (2005)(background)
  - Wes Bound — (1992)
- Lyle Lovett — The Road to Ensenada — (1996)
- Lynn Miles
- Mark Sholtez — The Distance Between Two Truths — (2010)
- Mylène Farmer — Anamorphosée — (1995)
- Neil Diamond:
  - In My Lifetime — (1996)
  - Lovescape — (1991)
  - Up on the Roof: Songs from the Brill Building — (1993)
  - "Christmas Album, Vol.2" — (1994)
- Oscar Castro-Neves:
  - Maracuja — (1989)
  - More than Yesterday — (1991)
  - Tropical Heart — (1993)
- Phyllis Hyman — I Refuse to Be Lonely — (1995)
- Randy Newman:
  - Faust — (1993)
  - Guilty: 30 Years of Randy Newman — (1998)
  - Bad Love — (1999)
  - Best of Randy Newman — (2001)
- Raul Malo — You're Only Lonely — (2006)
- Richard Elliot — Take to the Skies — (1991)
- Rubén Blades — Nothing But the Truth — (1988)
- Sarah Vaughan with Milton Nascimento — Brazilian Romance — (1987)
- Sergio Mendes with Joe Pizullo "Never Gonna Let You Go" (1983)
- Shawn Colvin:
  - A Few Small Repairs — (1996)
  - Whole New You — (2001)
- Sylvie Vartan — Toutes les femmes ont un secret — (1996)
- Tina Arena — Don't Ask — (1995)
- Valerie Carter — The Way It Is — (1996)
- Walter Becker
- Warren Zevon
- Youssou N'Dour
