= Bob Mann (guitarist) =

American guitarist and arranger (born 1944)

Bob Mann (born 1944 in New York City, United States) is an American guitarist and arranger.

== Early life and overview ==
Mann's decision to follow music came at age five through his father, Sy Mann, a well-respected and versatile pianist/arranger (and contemporary of Dick Hyman), who was an active part of the flourishing music business of New York City in the 1950s and 1960s. Mann started on piano, then at age 13 switched to guitar, studied music theory at Queens College and Manhattan School of Music before joining the USAF “Airmen of Note” in the late 1960s. Returning to NYC in 1970, he quickly became an in-demand studio and “live” guitarist and has subsequently enjoyed successful music careers in Toronto and Los Angeles before finally moving back to New York in 1999.

== Music career ==
A guitarist equally versed in R&B, jazz and pop, Mann has recorded and/or toured with James Taylor, Rod Stewart, Diana Ross, Linda Ronstadt, Billy Joel, Barbra Streisand, Celine Dion, Cher, Neil Diamond, Gladys Knight, Stevie Wonder, Bonnie Raitt, Brecker Bros., the Crusaders, Aaron Neville, Gordon Lightfoot, Anne Murray, Astrud Gilberto, Steve Tyrell, Lionel Hampton, Chico Hamilton, Melissa Manchester, Tony Orlando, BJ Thomas, Kenny Loggins, Mountain, Linda Eder and many more. Mann may be best known for providing the guitar solo (and arrangement) to the No. 1 single "Somewhere Out There", featuring Linda Ronstadt and James Ingram.

Mann has arranged and/or co-produced recordings featuring Rod Stewart, Diana Ross, Kristin Chenoweth, Steve Tyrell, Neal McCoy, BJ Thomas, Jamie Walters, John Stevens, and others. Yo-Yo Ma has performed several of Mann's cello arrangements with James Taylor in concert, and Taylor featured Mann's symphonic arrangement of "Mean Old Man" with the Philadelphia Orchestra in 2009. Fourplay commissioned Mann to write a symphonic chart of Chuck Loeb's "Above And Beyond" from their Let's Touch The Sky CD, which they performed with orchestra in Japan in late 2010.

Mann's TV and film scoring and arranging credits include work on Nurse Jackie, Something's Got To Give, That Thing You Do, Father of the Bride, The Five Heartbeats, Elvis-the Early Years, Flight of the Navigator, Diving In, 20 Dates, Family Prayers, T-Bone and Weasel, The Sonny and Cher Story, Matlock, Frank's Place, and more.

== Discography ==
With Bonnie Raitt

- Streetlights (Warner Bros. Records 1974)

With Chico Hamilton

- El Exigente: The Demanding One (Flying Dutchman 1970)

With Dreams

- Imagine My Surprise (Columbia Records 1971)

With James Taylor

- Never Die Young (Columbia Records 1987)
- Hourglass (Columbia Records 1997)

With Linda Ronstadt

- Lush Life (Asylum Records 1984)
- For Sentimental Reasons (Asylum Records 1986)

With Mountain

- Twin Peaks (Windfall Records 1974)
