= Valerie Carter =

American singer (1953–2017)

Background information
- Born: Valerie Gail Zakian Carter; February 5, 1953; Winter Haven, Florida, U.S.
- Died: March 4, 2017 (aged 64) St. Petersburg, Florida, U.S.
- Genres: Soul; rock; pop; folk
- Occupations: Singer; songwriter
- Years active: 1974–2017
- Labels: ARC; Columbia
- Formerly of: James Taylor; Jackson Browne; Don Henley
- Website: www.valeriecarter.com

Valerie Gail Zakian Carter (February 5, 1953 – March 4, 2017) was an American singer and songwriter.

== Biography ==
Carter began her career singing in coffeehouses as a teenager, and eventually became one-third of the country-folk band Howdy Moon. They debuted at the Troubadour in Los Angeles in 1974. Their one album is notable for the Carter-penned song "Cook with Honey," which had already been a hit for Judy Collins; and for the introduction of Carter to Lowell George, who produced the next album. He was a mentor to her until his death in 1979 and introduced her to Jackson Browne, James Taylor, and many of the artists working with her throughout her career.

Her first solo album, Just a Stone's Throw Away, featured an array of guest artists, including Maurice White, Lowell George, Linda Ronstadt, Jackson Browne, and Deniece Williams. The album was well received and garnered favorable reviews and placed her as the opening act for the Eagles in Europe. Two years later, she released another album Wild Child, and began touring with various artists, primarily James Taylor, Jackson Browne, and Linda Ronstadt.

Carter then released another solo album, The Way It Is, with guest artists including Phoebe Snow, Lyle Lovett, Edwin McCain, James Taylor, Linda Ronstadt, and Jackson Browne. Japan released a limited edition of this CD with an additional song by Tom Snow.

She followed two years later with EPs Find a River, Vanilla Grits, and a compilation CD Midnight Over Honey River. (Note: Midnight Over Honey River was not an official album, and was released without Carter's consent.)

=== Other work ===
Carter worked as a backup vocalist for a number of recording artists. These included Linda Ronstadt, Don Henley, Christopher Cross, Little Feat, Jackson Browne, Outlaws, and James Taylor.

Carter wrote the song "Cook with Honey," which was a hit for Judy Collins on her 1973 album True Stories and Other Dreams. Carter also co-wrote the Jackson Browne track "Love Needs a Heart" that was featured on his 1977 album Running on Empty. She also co-wrote "It Is One" and "Niño" on Browne's album Looking East. She worked as a writer for the Brothers Johnson on the track "Deceiver," Earth, Wind & Fire's "Turn It into Something Good," featured on the band's 1980 album Faces, and Cher's Black Rose band's "Never Should've Started."

In 1978, she performed the singing voice of the character Jan Mouse in the animated Halloween special, The Devil and Daniel Mouse, made by Canada-based studio Nelvana. She was credited under the pseudonym Laurel Runn, likely inspired by living in Laurel Canyon at the time. She sang several songs in the special, including a duet with singer John Sebastian of The Lovin' Spoonful fame. The following year, in 1979, her cover of "O-o-h Child" was featured in Matt Dillon's film debut in Over the Edge.

== Personal life and death ==
In the December 11, 1999, issue of Billboard, the marriage of Carter to Seth Katz, a television executive with Sony, was reported to have taken place on November 26, 1999, in Montclair, New Jersey.

In August and October 2009, Carter was arrested in St. Petersburg, Florida, for possession of drugs. She completed all of the court's requirements on May 25, 2011. American singer-songwriter James Taylor appeared at her drug court graduation ceremonies in a congratulatory effort on behalf of all of the graduates.

Carter died of a heart attack on March 4, 2017, at the age of 64.

== Legacy ==
The song "Valerie", recorded by Steve Winwood, was reportedly about her as was Jackson Browne's song "That Girl Could Sing".

In 2018, Carter's long time friend, Kathy Kurasch, produced The Lost Tapes, the first posthumous stand-alone album of previously unreleased material by Carter. It includes unreleased tracks recorded during her career, including "I Got Over It", co-written by Prince. It was released on Cowboy Angel Records, an indie label formed by Kurasch and Valerie's sister, Jan Carter. In 2022 they released The Lost Tapes Vol. 2.

In 2024, the Valerie Carter estate and Faragher Brothers joined forces and recreated the Faragher Brothers' "Never Get Your Love Behind Me" and "What My Baby Needs Now" by James Brown as a special edition 7-inch vinyl; Carter's vocals from previous recordings dating back to the late 1970s were used in both of these tracks.

== Discography ==
=== Collaboration albums ===
- Howdy Moon (1974)

=== Studio albums ===
- Just a Stone's Throw Away (1977)
- Wild Child (1978)
- The Way It Is (1996; reissued 2006)
- Find a River (1998; EP)
- Midnight Over Honey River (2003)
- The Lost Tapes (2018)
- Valerie Carter with Yoshiyuki Sahashi – Live in Tokyo, 1994 (2020)
- The Lost Tapes Vol. 2 (2022)

=== Compilation albums ===
- Ooh Child: The Columbia Years (2019)
- Vanilla Grits (2001)

=== Guest appearances ===
- Aaron Neville – Warm Your Heart (1991)
- Adam Mitchell – Redhead in Trouble (1979)
- Air Force – Air Force (1984)
- Al Kooper – Championship Wrestling (1982)
- Anna Vissi – Everything I Am (2001)
- Anne Murray – Anne Murray (1996)
- Arnold McCuller – Circa 1990 (2003)
- Aselin Debison – Sweet Is the Melody (2002)
- Bill Quateman – Just Like You (1979)
- Brian Elliot – Brian Elliot (1978)
- Christopher Cross:
  - Christopher Cross (1980)
  - Wishing Well (1994)
- Cliff DeYoung – Cliff DeYoung (1975)
- Curtis Stigers – Brighter Days (1999)
- Dan Fogelberg – Portrait: The Music of Dan Fogelberg (1997)
- Diana Ross:
  - Force Behind the Power (1991)
  - When You Dream (1993)
- Don Grusin – 10k-La (1980)
- Don Henley:
  - The End of the Innocence (1989)
  - Inside Job (2000)
- Eddie Money – Playing for Keeps (1980)
- Eric Carmen – Change of Heart (1978)
- Freebo – End of the Beginning (1999)
- Glenda Griffith – Glenda Griffith (1977)
- Glenn Frey – Strange Weather (1992)
- Greg Prestopino – Big Red Nude (1977)
- Henry Paul Band – Henry Paul (1982)
- Hirth Martinez – Feeling So Fine (2002)
- Hoyt Axton – Southbound (1975)
- Hurt (band) – Vol. II (2007)
- Jack Wagner – Lighting Up the Night (1985)
- Jackson Browne:
  - I'm Alive (1993)
  - Looking East (1996)
- James Taylor:
  - Gorilla (1975)
  - In the Pocket (1976)
  - New Moon Shine (1991)
  - Live (1993)
  - Best Live (1994)
  - Hourglass (1997)
  - Greatest Hits Volume 2 (2000)
- Jimmy Buffett – Margaritaville Cafe: Late Night Menu (1993)
- Jimmy Webb:
  - Angel Heart (1982)
  - Suspending Disbelief (1993)
- Jorge Calderón – City Music (1975)
- Jude Johnstone – Coming of Age (2002)
- Julia Fordham – Swept (1991)
- Julie Miller:
  - Orphans & Angels (1993)
  - Invisible Girl (1996)
- Keiko Matsui – Sapphire (1995)
- Kenny Loggins – December (1998)
- Larry John McNally – Larry John McNally (1982)
- Laura Allan – Laura Allan (1978)
- Linda Ronstadt:
  - Winter Light (1994)
  - Feels Like Home (1995)
  - Dedicated to the One I Love (1996)
- Little Feat:
  - The Last Record Album (1975)
  - Shake Me Up (1991)
- Lowell George – Thanks, I'll Eat It Here (1979)
- Lyle Lovett – Road to Ensenada (1996)
- Marty Balin – Blue Highway (2010)
- Mary Kay Place – Almost Grown (2011)
- Maureen McCormick – When You Get a Little Lonely (1995)
- Michel Polnareff – Michel Polnareff (1966)
- Neil Diamond:
  - Lovescape (1991)
  - Up on the Roof: Songs from the Brill Building (1993)
  - Christmas Album, Vol. 2 (1994)
  - In My Lifetime (1996)
- Nicolette Larson:
  - Nicolette (1978)
  - All Dressed Up and No Place to Go (1982)
- Ofra Haza – Kirya (1992)
- Outlaws – Ghost Riders (1980)
- Jack Wagner – Love Can Take Us All the Way (1986)
- Randy Newman – Born Again (1979)
- Rick Derringer – Free Ride (2002)
- Ringo Starr – Time Takes Time (1992)
- Rod Stewart – Foolish Behaviour (1980)
- Shawn Colvin:
  - Fat City (1992)
  - Wish You Were Here (1996)
- Tom Jans:
  - Eyes of an Only Child (1975)
  - Dark Blonde (1976)
  - Champion (2015)
- Tom Kell – Dove (2012)
- Tom Snow – Tom Snow (1976)
- Valerie Carter and Faragher Brothers (2024)
- Vesica Pisces – Halfway to Naked (2003)
- Vonda Shepard – Songs from Ally McBeal (1998)
- Warren Zevon – Back in the High Life (2000)
- Willie Nelson – Healing Hands of Time (1994)

=== Songwriting credits ===
- "Cook with Honey" – Judy Collins (True Stories and Other Dreams, 1973)
- "Love Needs a Heart" – Jackson Browne (Running on Empty, 1977)
- "Turn It into Something Good" – Earth, Wind & Fire (Faces, 1980)
- "Never Should Have Started" – Black Rose (Black Rose, 1980)
- "Deceiver" – The Brothers Johnson (released as B-side of 7" single "You Keep Me Coming Back", 1984)
- "It Is One" – Jackson Browne (Looking East, 1996)
- "Nino" – Jackson Browne (Looking East, 1996)
