= Benny Diggs =

American R&B and soul vocalist

- Born: Bennie Diggs
- Occupations: Singer-songwriter; vocalist; music director
- Years active: 1970–present
- Musical career
- Origin: New York City
- Genres: Rhythm and blues; soul
- Instruments: Vocalist
- Labels: RSO; RCA; Handshake

Bennie Diggs known professionally as Benny Diggs, is an American R&B and soul music director, vocalist, composer, and session musician best known for founding the New York Community Choir, and for co-founding the R&B group Revelation, along with Phillip Ballou, Arthur Freeman, and Arnold McCuller, and as a session singer on recordings by Nikki Giovanni, Carly Simon, Joe Cocker, Nancy Wilson, Ramsey Lewis, Robert Palmer and numerous others.

== Career ==
=== Revelation ===
In 1974, Diggs co-founded the R&B vocal group Revelation, alongside NYCC members Phillip Ballou, Arthur Freeman, and Arnold McCuller. From 1975 to 1982, the group released five gospel-infused R&B records under RSO Records, RCA Records, and Handshake Records.

=== New York Community Choir ===
In 1970, Diggs founded the New York Community Choir, which originally consisted of around 100 members. The choir, with Diggs as musical director, was featured on poet Nikki Giovanni’s album The Truth Is on Its Way. Giovanni would read her poems alongside gospel music performed by the NYCC at Lincoln Center’s Alice Tully Hall.

In 1977, the choir signed with RCA Records and released their self-titled debut album. The following year, they released Make Every Day Count, which included the dance hit "Express Yourself". The record was produced by Warren Schatz, with Diggs contributing as a songwriter, arranger, and musical director.

In 1995, Diggs performed as conductor for Jazz at Lincoln Center with Wynton Marsalis.

Diggs has produced recordings for Cissy Houston, Nancy Wilson, and Patti Austin, and has been a session singer on recordings for Nikki Giovanni, Carly Simon, Joe Cocker, Nany Wilson, Ramsey Lewis, Robert Palmer, among others. In addition, Diggs was musical director for the animated feature film "Twist!", which features Snoop Dogg and Patti LaBelle.

== Personal life ==
Benny Diggs has one son with Rozelia Diggs.

== Discography ==
=== With Revelation ===
- 1975: Revelation
- 1976: Get Ready For This
- 1979: Book of Revelation
- 1980: Don't Let Me Down
- 1981: Love Suite
- 1982: Revelation

=== With the New York Community Choir ===
==== Notable album appearances ====
- 1979: Keep The Fire – Kenny Loggins (background vocals)
- 1980: Hi Infidelity – REO Speedwagon (background vocals)
- 1981: Runaway – Bill Champlin; on "Satisfaction" and "Gotta Get Back to Love" (background vocals)
