= Wild Child (Valerie Carter album) =

Studio album by Valerie Carter
- Released: July 1, 1978
- Studio: Sunset Sound, Hollywood, CA.
- Genre: Rock
- Length: 42:21
- Label: Columbia
- Producer: James Newton Howard

Valerie Carter chronology
Just a Stone's Throw Away (1977)	Wild Child (1978)	The Way It Is (1996)

Wild Child is the second studio album by Valerie Carter. Some notable musicians on this album are Steve Lukather, Jeff Porcaro, David Hungate, and Steve Porcaro of Toto, Mike Utley of Jimmy Buffett's Coral Reefer Band, Jay Graydon of Airplay, Davey Johnstone of the Elton John Band, Verdine White of Earth Wind & Fire and Ray Parker Jr. The album was reissued in full as part of the 2019 compilation Ooh Child - The Columbia Years on Cherry Tree Records.

== Critical reception ==
Professional ratings
Review scores
Source	Rating
AllMusic	2.5/5 stars

The Globe and Mail wrote that Carter "has a very nice voice and, in fact, her singing abilities probably outweigh her songwriting ones," but concluded that "her versatile voice is being over-processed into pop slickness too much of the time." Smash Hits called Wild Child "an accomplished American album of gentle, shuffling songs done Fleetwood Mac style. It's all a bit too effortless to be actually wild, but this album has a wistful, haunting beauty."

Stephen Thomas Erlewine of AllMusic writes that Wild Child "never transcends its time, except for the most hardcore soft-rock collectors." Charles Donovan of PopMatters wrote of Wild Child in his tribute article to Valerie Carter that, "Her name appeared in the songwriting credits of roughly half the tracks. To some, it's the poor relation, with its disco-pop compromises, its studio wizards (James Newton Howard), its ultra-slick session players and commercial sheen. I've always liked it."

Joe Marchese of The Second Disc writes of Wild Child, "The versatile singer-songwriter had a hand in five of its nine songs compared to just three on the previous LP, making Wild Child arguably a more personal album despite the sleek production. The lyrics to the ironically upbeat opening track, "Crazy," may have cut too close to the bone for an artist who battled her share of personal demons over the years: "I'm always gonna be this way/Reckless and crazy/That's probably true…" An authenticity, not to mention confidence, surges though the album."

== Track listing ==
Side one
No.	Title	Writer(s)	Length
1.	"Crazy"	Valerie Carter; James Newton Howard; Richard Bell	4:30
2.	"Da Doo Rendezvous"	Andy Fairweather Low	4:37
3.	"What's Become of Us"	Carter; Bell	3:37
4.	"Taking the Long Way Home"	Carter; Howard	3:32
5.	"Lady in the Dark"	Carter; Howard; Steve Lukather	4:42
Total length:			42:21

Side two
No.	Title	Writer(s)	Length
6.	"The Story of Love"	Carter; Bell	4:09
7.	"The Blue Side"	David Lasley; Allee Willis	3:28
8.	"Change in Luck"	Tom Snow	4:49
9.	"Trying to Get to You"	Eugene Record	4:10
10.	"Wild Child"	David Batteau	4:47

Track information verified from the LP's liner notes and Sessiondays.

== Personnel ==
=== Musicians ===
- Valerie Carter – lead vocals
- James Newton Howard – piano, keyboards (all tracks)
- Steve Porcaro – synthesizers (1, 2)
- Mike Utley – organ (8)
- Steve Lukather – guitar (1, 2, 4–6, 8–10), guitar solo (5)
- Ray Parker Jr. – guitar solo (2)
- Jay Graydon – guitar (3, 7)
- Fred Tackett – acoustic guitar (2, 4, 10), guitar (3)
- Davey Johnstone – guitar (7)
- David Hungate – bass guitar (1, 3, 5, 7, 10)
- Chuck Rainey – bass guitar (2, 4, 8)
- Verdine White – bass guitar (6, 9)
- Jeff Porcaro – drums (all tracks)
- Victor Feldman – percussion (1, 3), piano (8, 10), percussion (10)
- Lenny Castro – percussion (7, 8)
- Don Myrick – saxophone (4, 9)
- Tom Saviano – saxophone (6)
- Jim Horn – saxophone (9)
- Steve Madaio – trumpet (9)
- Chuck Findley – trumpet (9)
- Vini Poncia – background vocals (3)
- Wendy Haas – background vocals (3)
- David Lasley – background vocals (4, 7, 9)

=== Technical ===
- Producer, string arrangements – James Newton Howard
- String arrangements, conductor – Jimmy Haskell
- Horn arrangements – Thomas Washington
- Concertmaster – Jimmy Getzoff, Sid Sharp
- Design – Nancy Donald, Tony Lane
- Engineer – Tom Knox
- Assistant engineers – Bob Schaper, Dana Latham, Howard Steele, Jim Isaacson, Kevin Meyers, Rick Ruggiere, Ron Hitchcock
- Mastered by Doug Sax, Mike Reese
- Photography – Sam Emerson
- Cover photography – Bob Seidemann
- Production manager – Robin Rinehart
- Remix engineer – Bill Schnee

Personnel information retrieved from Discogs, Session Days and AllMusic.
