= Never Die Young =

Studio album by James Taylor
- Released: January 1988
- Recorded: 1987
- Studio: Power Station, New York City
- Genre: Rock
- Length: 40:18
- Label: Columbia/Legacy
- Producer: Don Grolnick

James Taylor chronology
Classic Songs (1985)	Never Die Young (1988)	New Moon Shine (1991)

Singles from Never Die Young
- 1. "Never Die Young" Released: October 1987; 2. "Baby Boom Baby" Released: July 1988; 3. "Sweet Potato Pie" Released: December 1988

Professional ratings
Review scores
Source	Rating
AllMusic	3/5 stars
Encyclopedia of Popular Music	3/5 stars
MusicHound	2/5
The Rolling Stone Album Guide	2/5 stars

Never Die Young is the twelfth studio album by singer-songwriter James Taylor released in 1988, three years after his previous effort, That's Why I'm Here. The album reached No. 25 on the Billboard 200 and eventually was certified Platinum by the RIAA. It features the title track, which peaked at No. 80 on the Billboard Hot 100, becoming the only charting single from the album.

Cash Box said of the title track that the "lyrics are, as always, a dazzling string of pearls that mesmerize your heart while the musical feel covers you like a warm breeze." Cash Box said of "Baby Boom Baby" that "Taylor again defines the agonizingly beautiful attainment of everything and really nothing at all, life's passage and passing." Cash Box said of "Sweet Potato Pie" that it contains "smooth yet deceptively deep material."

James Taylor sings "Sweet Potato Pie" as a duet with Ray Charles on Charles' 2004 Grammy Winning album Genius Loves Company.

== Track listing ==
All songs were written by James Taylor, except where noted.

1. "Never Die Young" – 4:24
2. "T-Bone" (Bill Payne, Taylor) – 3:47
3. "Baby Boom Baby" (Taylor, Zachary Wiesner) – 4:59
4. "Runaway Boy" – 4:18
5. "Valentine's Day" – 2:35
6. "Sun on the Moon" – 4:09
7. "Sweet Potato Pie" – 3:30
8. "Home by Another Way" (Timothy Mayer, Taylor) – 3:50
9. "Letter in the Mail" – 4:41
10. "First of May" – 4:01

== Personnel ==
- James Taylor – lead vocals, guitars
- Don Grolnick – keyboards
- Clifford Carter – synthesizer programming
- Robbie Kilgore – synthesizer programming
- Bill Payne – synthesizers (2, 4)
- Bob Mann – guitars
- Jeff Mironov – additional guitars (2, 6)
- Dan Dugmore – banjo, pedal steel guitar
- Leland Sklar – bass guitar (1–4, 6–10)
- Jay Leonhart – acoustic bass (5)
- Carlos Vega – drums, percussion
- "Cafe" Edison A. da Silva – percussion (10)
- Michael Brecker – tenor saxophone (2, 3)
- Mark O'Connor – violin (4, 5)
- Greg "Fingers" Taylor – harmonica (8)
- Rosemary Butler – backing vocals
- Arnold McCuller – backing vocals
- Lani Groves – additional backing vocals (1, 6, 10)
- David Lasley – additional backing vocals (1, 6, 10)

== Production ==
- Producer – Don Grolnick
- Production Coordinator – Peter Stiglin
- Recorded and Mixed by James Farber
- Assistant Engineer – Don Rodenbach
- Recorded and Mixed at The Power Station (New York, NY).
- Guitar and Piano Technician – Edd Kolakowski
- Digital Editing – Rhonda Schoen
- Mastered by Greg Calbi at Sterling Sound (New York, NY).
- Wolf Photos – Jim Brandenburg
- J.T. Photos – Rudy Molacek
- Art Direction – Marc Balet
