= Millworker =

Song by James Taylor

from the album Flag
- Released: May 1979
- Recorded: Early 1979
- Studio: Sound Factory (Hollywood)
- Genre: Folk rock
- Length: 3:52
- Label: Columbia
- Songwriter: James Taylor
- Producer: Peter Asher

"Millworker", or "Millwork", is a song written by James Taylor. It was originally written for the Stephen Schwartz Broadway musical Working. Taylor's own recording was released on his 1979 album Flag along with "Brother Trucker", which Taylor also wrote for Working. It has also been covered by other artists, including Bette Midler, Emmylou Harris, Pearl Jam's Eddie Vedder, Bruce Springsteen, Jennifer Warnes and Francis Cabrel.

== Background ==
According to Taylor, he was inspired to write the song quickly one night at his home in Martha's Vineyard, "about six feet" from where he wrote his earlier song "Secret O' Life". He was initially impressed with the song and how he was able to write it from the perspective of a woman. He originally started writing the song about a truck driver, rather than a millworker, and according to Taylor the lyrics are not about any particular character in the book by Studs Terkel, Working: People Talk About What They Do All Day and How They Feel About What They Do which was the basis for the musical Working. However, according to Bruce Springsteen biographer Marc Dolan, the lyrics were based on the words of union organizer Grace Clements, who was interviewed for Terkel's book. In the completed song, the protagonist became a young woman in the 1800s, who had been married to a drunken man and was forced to work in the textile mill after he died and left her alone with three children to feed. As relief from her drudgery she daydreams of her father's smile and her grandfather's stories. She recognizes that she is trapped and that her life is wasted because she made some poor choices. As she sings, she is miserable and old before her time, with nothing to look forward to. Taylor biographer Mark Robowsky describes the song as "a transfixing self-portrait through the tired eyes of a female laborer chained by life to 'her machine.'"

The title of the song used in Working was "Millwork". Stephen Schwartz regarded it as his favorite song in the show. He also claimed that the song was entirely Taylor's idea and that he did not even think of the subject as a possible song. Author John Bush Jones regards the singer of "Millwork" as being "perhaps more anguished" than any of the other characters in Working. Robin Lamont sang the song on Broadway.

== Critical reception ==
Rolling Stone critic Stephen Holden regards "Millworker" as one of the key songs on Flag, describing as "Flag's most eloquent song". Taylor biographer Timothy White describes the Broadway version of the song as "a sublime, if under-esteemed, slice of stage magic", also praising the "dignity" of Lamont's performance. Jones describes the song as "graphic and powerful". Robowsky describes the song as "an anthem of class inequality and union solidarity". "Millworker" was included on Taylor's live album Live and his compilation album The Essential James Taylor. Taylor performed "Millworker" on Saturday Night Live on May 12, 1979 along with two other songs from Flag, "Up on the Roof" and "Johnnie Comes Back".

== Covers ==
Bette Midler covered "Millworker" on her 1979 album Thighs and Whispers. According to Midler biographer Mark Bego, Midler's version is "a real treat", giving the song a "slow and pensive treatment" that brings the character to life. Billboard described her version as "sensitive". AllMusic critic Joe Viglione finds her version to be entertaining, and that it plays to Midler's strengths. Emmylou Harris covered "Millworker" on her 1981 album Evangeline. AllMusic critic Stewart Mason did not regard it as being very good. However, Mark Coleman and Mark Kemp of The New Rolling Stone Album Guide regarded her "heartfelt" version to be the one good thing on the album. Harris had wanted to include the song on her previous album, Roses in the Snow, but her producer Brian Ahern convinced her that it was too much of a pop song for that bluegrass album. Bruce Springsteen sang the song honoring Taylor on the 2006 album A Musicares Person of the Year Tribute. Pearl Jam's Eddie Vedder has covered the song in concert at the Delta Plex in Grand Rapids, MI, on Oct. 03, 2004.

Francis Cabrel covered the song in French as "La fabrique" for his 1984 live album Public.

== Personnel ==
- James Taylor – vocals, acoustic guitar
- Don Grolnick – piano, harmonium, shoe
- Jesse Levy – cello
- Louise Schulmann – viola
