= Her Town Too =

Single by James Taylor and JD Souther

from the album Dad Loves His Work
- B-side: "Believe It or Not"
- Released: February 1981
- Recorded: 1980
- Studio: Record One, Los Angeles
- Genre: Soft rock
- Length: 4:35
- Label: Columbia
- Songwriters: James Taylor, JD Souther, Waddy Wachtel
- Producer: Peter Asher

James Taylor singles chronology
"Up on the Roof" (1979)	"Her Town Too" (1981)	"Hard Times" (1981)

JD Souther singles chronology
"If You Don't Want My Love" (1980)	"Her Town Too" (1981)	"Go Ahead and Rain" (1984)

"Her Town Too" is a song written by James Taylor, JD Souther and Waddy Wachtel, and first released as a duet between Taylor and Souther on Taylor's 1981 album Dad Loves His Work. "Her Town Too" was later released on the 2000 compilation album Greatest Hits Volume 2. The song was also released as a single, peaking at No. 11 on the Billboard Hot 100 for the weeks of May 2 and 9, 1981. It is Taylor's last single to reach the top 40 on that chart as of 2026. "Her Town Too" also reached No. 5 on the Billboard Adult Contemporary chart and No. 21 on the Mainstream Rock chart.

== Background ==
The subject of "Her Town Too" is the aftermath of a breakup of a long term relationship. Taylor has called it "a tender, well-meaning song about how difficult it was to be friends" with both parties after the breakup. Since Taylor's marriage to Carly Simon was breaking up at the time, there was speculation that the song was about their relationship. However, Taylor has stated that the song was about "the ex-wife of a mutual friend." Author Sheila Weller has written that the subject was Betsy Asher, who had recently divorced from Taylor's longtime manager and producer Peter Asher, but of course this is just speculation.

Taylor has said of the song that it "showed a maturity in song structure that had been developing since I wrote 'Your Smiling Face' for JT." "Your Smiling Face and JT had been issued four years earlier, in 1977. Taylor also claimed that the song had "a relentless bolero quality."

== Reception ==
The Rolling Stone Album Guide called it a "gently incisive divorce song" that was "among [Taylor's] finest pieces of writing." Rolling Stone critic Don Shewey notes that despite the song's worthy ambitions, the narrative never quite reaches a resolution, and thus the song "comes across as merely a catchy, mindless ditty." Montreal Gazette critic John Griffin praised the song's "mellifluous melody" and the way lyrics such as "she always figured that they were her friends but maybe they can live without her" resonates with people who have had friendships with one or the other partner disintegrate after a relationship ends. Record World said that Taylor's and Souther's voices "complement each other perfectly."

== Charts ==
Chart (1980)	Peak position
Australia (Kent Music Report)	54
