= New Moon Shine =

Studio album by James Taylor
- Released: October 1, 1991
- Recorded: June 1991
- Studio: The Power Station (New York City); Skyline Studios (New York City); A&M Studios (Los Angeles); Studio F (Los Angeles)
- Genre: Soft rock
- Length: 47:52
- Label: Columbia
- Producer: Don Grolnick; Danny Kortchmar

James Taylor chronology
Never Die Young (1988)	New Moon Shine (1991)	Live (1993)

Singles from New Moon Shine
- 1. "Copperline" Released: 1991; 2. "(I've Got to) Stop Thinkin' 'Bout That" Released: 1991

New Moon Shine is the thirteenth studio album by singer-songwriter James Taylor released in 1991. The album peaked at number 37 on the Billboard 200 chart and certified platinum. The album was producer-pianist Don Grolnick's sixth and final studio album with Taylor prior to his death in 1996 at age 48 from Non-Hodgkin lymphoma.

== Reception ==
Professional ratings
Review scores
Source	Rating
AllMusic	3/5 stars
The Encyclopedia of Popular Music	3/5 stars
MusicHound Rock: The Essential Album Guide	3.5/5 stars
The Rolling Stone Album Guide	3.5/5 stars

The album received generally positive reviews; The New York Times’s Stephen Holden observed that New Moon Shine "finds [Taylor] near the top of his form in songs like 'Slap Leather,' a playfully pungent rock-and-roll critique of social and environmental ills, and 'Copperline,' a nostalgic ballad remembering his North Carolina roots."

Fairport Convention covered "The Frozen Man" on their album Old New Borrowed Blue.

== Track listing ==
All songs written by James Taylor unless otherwise noted.

1. "Copperline" (Reynolds Price, Taylor) – 4:22
2. "Down in the Hole" – 5:15
3. "(I've Got to) Stop Thinkin' 'Bout That" (Danny Kortchmar, Taylor) – 4:00
4. "Shed a Little Light" – 3:52
5. "The Frozen Man" – 3:54
6. "Slap Leather" – 2:00
7. "Like Everyone She Knows" – 4:56
8. "One More Go Round" – 4:40
9. "Everybody Loves to Cha Cha Cha" (Sam Cooke) – 3:37
10. "Native Son" – 3:49
11. "Oh, Brother" – 4:24
12. "The Water Is Wide" (Traditional) – 3:00

== Personnel ==
- James Taylor – lead vocals, acoustic guitar (1–3, 5–12), arrangements (12)
- Don Grolnick – acoustic piano, organ, synthesizers, arrangements (12)
- Clifford Carter – synthesizers, synthesizer programming
- Dan Stein – synthesizer programming (3, 5)
- Danny Kortchmar – acoustic guitar (3, 5)
- Michael Landau – electric guitars
- Jerry Douglas – Dobro
- Jimmy Johnson – bass guitar (1–8, 10–12)
- Tony Levin – bass guitar (9)
- Carlos Vega – drums (1, 2, 4, 6–8, 10–12)
- Steve Jordan – drums (3, 5)
- Steve Gadd – drums (9)
- Don Alias – percussion
- Mark O'Connor – violin
- Bob Mintzer – tenor saxophone (3)
- Branford Marsalis – soprano saxophone (7)
- Michael Brecker – tenor saxophone (8, 9)
- Dave Bargeron – trombone (3)
- Randy Brecker – trumpet (3)
- Valerie Carter – backing vocals
- David Lasley – backing vocals
- Kate Markowitz – backing vocals
- Arnold McCuller – backing vocals
- Phillip Ballou – backing vocals (10)

=== Production ===
- Producers – Don Grolnick (all tracks); Danny Kortchmar (Tracks 3 & 5).
- Production Coordinator – Peter Stiglin
- Recorded and Mixed by James Farber
- Assistant Engineers – John Aguto, Patrick Dillett, Rob Jazco, Nathaniel Kunkel, Matthew Lamonica and Katherine Miller.
- Mix Assistant – Katherine Miller
- Recorded at The Power Station and Skyline Studios (New York, NY); A&M Studios (Hollywood, CA); Studio F (Los Angeles, CA).
- Mixed at Skyline Studios
- Mastered by Greg Calbi at Sterling Sound (New York, NY).
- Art Direction – Arnold Levine
- Design Assistants – Stefanie Dash, Lisa Sparagano and Marcus Wyns.
- Photography – Lee Crum
