= Dad Loves His Work =

Studio album by James Taylor
- Released: March 1981
- Recorded: September 5, 1980 – January 18, 1981
- Studio: Record One, Los Angeles
- Genre: Soft rock
- Length: 38:49
- Label: Columbia
- Producer: Peter Asher

James Taylor chronology
Flag (1979)	Dad Loves His Work (1981)	That's Why I'm Here (1985)

Singles from Dad Loves His Work
- 1. "Her Town Too" Released: February 1981; 2. "Hard Times" Released: May 1981

Dad Loves His Work is the tenth studio album by James Taylor, released in 1981. The album includes the duet with JD Souther titled "Her Town Too", which peaked at number 11 on the Billboard Hot 100 and number 5 on the Billboard Adult Contemporary chart. The album was certified platinum in the United States. It was his first album without any cover versions.

== Background ==
The album's title was a response by Taylor to then-wife Carly Simon, who had issued an ultimatum to Taylor regarding his constant touring, leaving her home with their two children, Benjamin and Sally. Simon informed Taylor in 1980 that unless he curtailed his schedule to be home more with his family, that she would divorce him. Shortly before the album's release, the pair separated, officially dissolving their 11-year marriage in 1983. Taylor, who was still struggling with a lengthy history of drug abuse, later admitted that he was ill-equipped to be a family man at that time in his life and put his career before his family.

== Critical reception ==
Professional ratings
Review scores
Source	Rating
AllMusic	4/5 stars
The Encyclopedia of Popular Music	2/5 stars
MusicHound	2.5/5 stars
The Rolling Stone Album Guide	3/5 stars

Rolling Stone wrote that "the tunes are simple and memorable—you can sing along with most of them after two listens."

== Track listing ==
All songs by James Taylor unless otherwise noted.

Side one

1. "Hard Times" – 3:13
2. "Her Town Too" (Duet with JD Souther) (Taylor, JD Souther, Waddy Wachtel) – 4:34
3. "Hour That the Morning Comes" – 2:56
4. "I Will Follow" – 4:19
5. "Believe It or Not" – 3:53

Side two

6. "Stand and Fight" (Taylor, Jacob Brackman) – 3:10
7. "Only for Me" – 4:55
8. "Summer's Here" – 2:43
9. "Sugar Trade" (Taylor, Jimmy Buffett, Timothy Mayer) – 2:48
10. "London Town" – 3:56
11. "That Lonesome Road" (Taylor, Don Grolnick) – 2:22

== Personnel ==
- James Taylor – lead vocals, acoustic guitar (3–10), bass harmonica (9)
- Bill Cuomo – synthesizers (1, 4)
- Don Grolnick – acoustic piano (1, 3, 5, 10, 11), organ (1–3, 7–9), Fender Rhodes (2, 5, 8, 10), keyboards (4)
- Dan Dugmore – electric guitar (1–3, 6–8, 10), pedal steel guitar (4, 5)
- Waddy Wachtel – electric guitar (1, 4–8, 10), guitar solo (1), acoustic guitar (2), slide guitar (3)
- Leland Sklar – bass (1–10)
- Rick Marotta – drums (1–8, 10), congas (1), percussion (5, 6), timbales (8)
- Peter Asher – percussion (6, 7), shaker (8)
- Greg "Fingers" Taylor – harmonica (6, 8, 10)
- Gene Page – string arrangements and conductor (2)
- David Lasley – backing vocals (1, 4, 6, 7, 10)
- Arnold McCuller – backing vocals (1, 4, 6, 7, 10)
- JD Souther – harmony vocals (2)

Choir on "That Lonesome Road"

- Peter Asher
- Jim Gilstrap
- Bernard Ighner
- David Lasley
- Arnold McCuller
- James Taylor
- Jennifer Warnes

== Production ==
- Producer – Peter Asher
- Engineer – Val Garay
- Assistant Engineer – Niko Bolas
- Recorded at Record One (Los Angeles, CA).
- Piano and Keyboard Technician – Edd Kolakowski
- Mastered by Doug Sax and Mike Reese at The Mastering Lab (Hollywood, CA).
- Photography – Aaron Rapoport
- Art Direction and Design – John Kosh

== Charts ==
Chart (1981)	Peak position
Australia (Kent Music Report)	23
