= Alfred Burt =

American jazz musician (1920-1954)

Alfred Shaddick Burt (April 22, 1920 – February 7, 1954) was an American jazz musician who is best known for composing the music for fifteen Christmas carols between 1942 and 1954. Only one of the carols was performed in public outside his immediate family circle during his lifetime.

== Early life ==
Burt was born in Marquette, Michigan. His family moved to Pontiac, Michigan when he was two after his father, Bates G. Burt (1878–1948), became rector of All Saints Pontiac, an Episcopal church in Pontiac. At the age of 10, having shown an early interest in music, Alfred received his first musical instrument, a cornet, as a present from his parents. Though he would learn to play several other instruments, including the piano, Alfred spent most of his life playing cornet and trumpet in bands and orchestras, with a special interest in jazz.

Burt studied music at the University of Michigan in Ann Arbor, with an emphasis on Music Theory. He graduated as an outstanding music theory student with a Bachelor of Music degree in 1942.

A tradition that the elder Burt had begun prior to moving to Pontiac in 1922, was the creation of a Christmas card, which he sent to family members and parishioners. On these cards were original Christmas carols, with both the words and music by the Reverend Burt. After Alfred graduated from college, his father asked him to take over as composer and write the music for the family Christmas card in 1942, "Christmas Cometh Caroling". From then on, Alfred would write the music for the family's Christmas cards.

== World War II and aftermath ==
During World War II, Burt served as an officer in the United States Army, stationed at San Angelo, Texas. While there, he served with the Army Air Force Band and filled in with the Houston Symphony as a trumpeter. His father sent him the lyrics for the carols from Michigan, first in 1943 ("Jesu Parvule") and then in 1944 ("What Are The Signs"). Burt completed the music from his base.

Burt married his childhood sweetheart, Anne Shortt (August 14, 1922 – November 30, 2000), on October 13, 1945. Finally earning his discharge in early 1946, he formed a short-lived band; after the group disbanded, he and Anne returned to Michigan to spend time with his father. The 1947 Christmas card, "Nigh Bethlehem," was the last collaboration between Alfred and Bates Burt. Reverend Burt died of a heart attack early in 1948. Alfred and his wife chose to continue the family Christmas card tradition in his honor.

Burt resumed his career in New York as a musician and arranger/composer. He also worked as a teacher at The American Theatre Wing professional school, where he collaborated with Helen Hobbs Jordan (April 6, 1907 – April 26, 2006) on a sight-reading book.

== Professional life ==
Burt joined the Alvino Rey Orchestra in 1949. Meanwhile, Anne remained in Michigan, where the Burts' only child, Diane Bates Burt, was born on March 8, 1950. While she was pregnant, Anne, in consultation with Alfred, asked an old family friend, Wilha Hutson (1901–2002), the organist at Rev. Bates Burt's church, to write the lyrics for the annual Christmas card, which Alfred then would set to music. This carol, entitled "Sleep, Baby Mine" (or "Carol of the Mother") was a lullaby for their unborn child. In the spring of 1950, Alfred, Anne and six-week-old Diane moved to Los Angeles, California.

Burt continued his professional career as an arranger and musician for bands such as Hal Richards, Horace Heidt and Alvino Rey.

Over the next several years and, as the Burts' circle of friends grew, the Christmas card list grew from 50 to 450 people. But still, the Alfred Burt Carols remained unknown outside the Burts' growing mailing list.

That changed with the 1952 carol, "Come, Dear Children". Burt finished writing the music during a rehearsal with the Blue Reys, the vocal group with Alvino Rey's orchestra. He asked them to sing it so he could make sure the harmonies worked; they liked it so much that they asked Burt if they could sing it at The King Sisters annual Christmas party. It proved to be a hit among the party guests, and served to introduce Burt's carols to Hollywood.

The Burt-Hutson collaboration continued until Alfred Burt's death in 1954.

== Illness and death ==
Through the early part of 1953, Burt complained of a persistent virus and fatigue. Eventually agreeing to a thorough medical examination, he was diagnosed with terminal lung cancer. He spent his final months at home in Pacoima, California.

James Conkling, at that time the president of Columbia Records, was informed of Burt's failing health and organized the project, assembling an all-star choir of Hollywood singers to perform Burt's four-part harmonies. Recording sessions for the older carols took place in late 1953 in the North Hollywood LDS Church with Burt present to conduct from his wheelchair. Meanwhile, to fill the album, Burt was assigned four new carols. One of them, "O Hearken Ye", was sent as the 1953 family Christmas card. For the first time, Alfred knew his carols were going to be recorded.

Burt finished the last of his carols, "The Star Carol", on February 5, 1954. Less than two days later, he died. "The Star Carol" would be used on the final Burt family Christmas card that holiday season. The artwork and printing of the card was donated by Columbia Records with a staff photographer providing the photo of the little girl looking at a Christmas ornament. Many thought it was Al's daughter, Diane Burt.

== First recordings of the carols ==
Original cover of The Christmas Mood, on which 12 of the Burt carols first appeared.

Twelve of Burt's carols were released in time for the holiday season of 1954 on a 10-inch vinyl album called The Christmas Mood (Columbia CL 6336). The album was credited to "The Columbia Choir", conducted by Bud Linn and produced by "Edwin L. (Buddy) Cole", as the LP jacket credits him, who was at that time the husband of Yvonne King Cole. The Christmas Mood was recorded by The Columbia Choir under the direction of Grafton (Bud) Linn at St. Michael and All Angels Episcopal church, on Coldwater Canyon Avenue in Studio City, California, of which Alfred was assistant choir director and both he and his wife were members.

The album remained in print for several Christmas seasons. In 1955, the original 10-inch LP was reissued with a new catalog number (CL 2546) as part of Columbia's short-lived "House Party Series", which was designed to keep the 10-inch album alive, even as most labels released most of their new LPs on 12-inch discs. In 1957, the album was reissued once again, this time on a 12-inch LP as CL 1051, including an instrumental brass ensemble, a medley of the carols arranged and conducted by Ralph Carmichael. The original Columbia Choir album did not include "Christmas Cometh Caroling", "What Are the Signs", and "Sleep Baby Mine", also titled "The Carol of the Mother".

Capitol Records artists Tennessee Ernie Ford, Fred Waring and His Pennsylvanians and Nat King Cole recorded Burt's carols. In 1958, Ford recorded "The Star Carol" for his first full-length album of Christmas music and named the entire album of songs after it. The Star Carol (Capitol T/ST 1071) peaked at Billboard #4 in the Christmas season of 1958–59 and reappeared on either the main LP charts or the special Christmas charts for a decade thereafter. In 1959, Waring recorded the Christmas LP The Sounds of Christmas (Capitol T/ST 1260), and six of the Alfred Burt Carols appeared on it: "Caroling, Caroling", "O Hearken Ye", "Jesu Parvule", "The Star Carol", "Come Dear Children", and "This Is Christmas" (the latter also known under the name "Bright, Bright the Holly Berries"). Finally, Cole recorded "Caroling, Caroling" on his 1960 album The Magic of Christmas (Capitol W/SW 1444), which was reissued under the title The Christmas Song in 1963 and has remained in print ever since. Simon and Garfunkel recorded "The Star Carol" in 1967, which was released on the LP A Very Merry Christmas.

The first recording of all 15 of The Alfred Burt Carols was released in 1964 by the Voices of Jimmy Joyce called This Is Christmas: A Complete Collection of the Alfred S. Burt Carols (Warner Bros. W/WS 1566). The recording was produced by Anne S. Burt, Alfred's wife, and James Conkling, president of Warner Bros. Records. The recording engineer was Lowell Frank. The unusual 8-part vocal harmony arrangements were written by Alfred's lifelong friend, Brinley Bethel. The tracks were recorded during a 3-day session in Hollywood on September 9, 10 & 11 of 1963. The recording was nominated for a Grammy in 1964 in the category of Best Pop Instrumental Performance. In 1964, there was no category for a cappella vocal music; thus, the work was placed in the instrumental category. It lost to Henry Mancini's "Pink Panther" theme.

== Legacy ==
"Caroling, Caroling" and "Some Children See Him" are the most recorded carols written by Alfred S. Burt.

Other recordings of The Alfred Burt Carols include Simon and Garfunkel's 1967 recording of "The Star Carol" (first released on the Columbia Records compilation A Very Merry Christmas) and renditions of "Some Children See Him" by Andy Williams (1965 on the album Merry Christmas), George Winston (1982 on the album December), Jeffrey Foskett (1996 on the album Christmas at the Beach), Kenny Loggins (1998 on the album December), James Taylor (2004 on the album James Taylor at Christmas), and David Archuleta (2018 on the album Winter in the Air).

The Singers Unlimited recorded six of the Alfred Burt Carols on their 1972 album Christmas. Gas House Gang also has recorded Burt carols in their 2000 CD Some Children See Him.

John Williams wrote two medleys of Alfred Burt's works for the Boston Pops Orchestra, one from the album Joy To The World (TNK 48232) and another for the album We Wish You A Merry Christmas (Philips 41627).

In 1990, Julie Andrews recorded "This Is Christmas" on a Hallmark recording, The Sounds Of Christmas from Around the World, with the London Symphony. Natalie Cole recorded "Caroling, Caroling" on her album Holly & Ivy in 1994.

Both The Christmas Mood (VAG Records 4223) of 1954 and This Is Christmas (VAG Records 4222) of 1964 were remastered in 1995, and several of the tracks from those recordings were used to celebrate the 50th year of the carols on The Alfred Burt Christmas Carols Golden Anniversary (VAG Records 4225) in 2004.

In 1980, Diane Burt, Alfred's daughter, started an eight voice a cappella ensemble called The Caroling Company to represent the carols. The Caroling Company included eight of the Alfred Burt Carols on their Grammy listed CD, A Christmas Present From The Caroling Company, in 2003.

In 2001, Burt's grandniece, the composer Abbie Betinis, revived the family tradition of sending Christmas cards with an original carol each holiday season, which she also introduces each year on Minnesota Public Radio.

== The carols ==
- "Christmas Cometh Caroling" (1942)
- "Jesu Parvule" (1943)
- "What Are the Signs" (1944)
- "Ah, Bleak and Chill the Wintry Wind" (1945)
- "All on a Christmas Morning" (1946)
- "Nigh Bethlehem" (1947)
- "Christ in the Stranger's Guise" (1948)
- "Sleep Baby Mine" (1949)
- "This Is Christmas" (also known as "Bright, Bright, the Holly Berries") (1950)
- "Some Children See Him" (1951)
- "Come, Dear Children" (1952)
- "O, Hearken Ye" (1953)
- "Caroling, Caroling" (1954)
- "We'll Dress the House" (1954)
- "The Star Carol" (1954)
