= Revelation (vocal group) =

American R&B and soul vocal group

- Origin: New York City
- Genres: Rhythm and blues; soul
- Years active: 1974-1981
- Labels: RSO; RCA; Handshake Records
- Members: Benny Diggs; Phillip Ballou; Arthur Freeman; Arnold McCuller

Revelation was an American R&B and soul vocal group formed in 1974 in New York City, best known for their gospel harmonies. The group comprised Benny Diggs, Phillip Ballou, Arthur Freeman, and Arnold McCuller, all of whom have roots in gospel music and have previously performed with the Isaac Douglas Singers and New York Community Choir. Revelation signed with RSO Records and released their self-titled debut album in 1975, with production by Norman Harris. In 1977, Revelation signed with RCA Records, where members of the group wrote Make Every Day Count with the New York Community Choir, produced by Warren Schatz in 1978. In 1980, the group signed with Handshake Records.

== Discography ==
=== Studio albums ===
==== Revelation (1975, RSO Records) ====
- "I Can't Move No Mountains"
- "Haven't Got a Lover To My Name"
- "Just Too Many People"
- "Sweet Talk and Melodies"
- "Get Ready for This" (B. Lanzaroni, W. Schatz, Revelation)
- "We've Gotta Survive"
- "Where It's Warm"
- "What Good Am I Without You"

==== Get Ready For This (1976, RSO Records) ====
- "Get Ready for This" (B. Lanzaroni, W. Schatz, Revelation)
- "When I Fall in Love" (Edward Heyman, Victor Young)
- "With You"
- "Love Is the Only Way"
- "It’s You Girl"
- "Falling in Love Again"
- "Why Do You Want My Love"
- "We’ve Gotta Survive"
- "Just Too Many People"

==== Book of Revelation (1979, RSO Records) ====
- "Feel It"
- "No Burden"
- "It's Got to Be a Shame"
- "I Believe in Miracles"
- "We Can Make It"
- "So in Love"
- "No One's Gonna Love You"
- "Lonely Room"

==== Don't Let Me Down (1980, RSO Records) ====
- "Don't Let Me Down"
- "Make It Easy"
- "When I Fall in Love"
- "Do You Want to Know a Secret"
- "Lonely Night"
- "Gonna Give You Love"
- "Can't Stop the Feeling"
- "Loving You All the Way"

==== Love Suite (1981, Capitol Records) ====
- "Love Suite"
- "Feel the Fire"
- "You Are My Number One"
- "Sexual Healing"
- "Let Me Love You"
- "Fantasy"
- "One More Night"
- "Give Me a Sign"

==== Revelation (1982, Handshake Records) ====
- "Holdin’ On!" (Phil Ballou, Benny Diggs, Morris Gray, Kevin Owens, Joseph Joubert, Thomas C. Washington)
- "Without Love" (Roxanne J. Seeman, Eduardo del Barrio)
- "I'm Not Givin' You Up" (Tom Shapiro, Michael Garvin)
- "Since I Fell for You" (Buddy Johnson)
- "Celebrate" (Phil Ballou, Benny Diggs, Morris Gray, Kevin Owens, Thomas C. Washington)
