= October Road (album) =

Studio album by James Taylor
- Released: August 13, 2002
- Recorded: Early 2000–2002
- Studio: Linden Oaks Studios (Rochester, NY); Q Division Studios (Somerville, MA); Secret Sound (New York City, NY); Flying Monkey Studios (New York City, NY); Right Track Recording (New York City, NY); Signal Path Studios (Nashville, TN); The Village Recorder (Los Angeles, CA); Capitol Studios (Los Angeles, CA)
- Genre: Rock; folk rock; country rock
- Length: 52:00
- Label: Columbia
- Producer: Russ Titelman

James Taylor chronology
Greatest Hits Volume 2 (2000)	October Road (2002)	The Best of James Taylor (2003)

Professional ratings
Review scores
Source	Rating
AllMusic	4/5 stars
The Guardian	4/5 stars
Rolling Stone	4/5 stars
The Rolling Stone Album Guide	3/5 stars
Encyclopedia of Popular Music	5/5 stars

October Road is the 15th studio album by singer-songwriter James Taylor, released in 2002. The album would be Taylor's last album of original material until Before This World in 2015. It was nominated for the Grammy Award for Best Male Pop Performance at the 45th Grammy Awards in 2003. The album debuted at number four on the Billboard 200 with 154,000 copies sold in its opening week, Taylor's best-performing album in the SoundScan era. The album was certified Platinum by the RIAA on November 21, 2002, and had sold 1,076,000 copies in the United States as of May 2015.

The album has two versions: a single-disc version and a "limited edition" two-disc version, which contains three extra songs, as well as a video presentation.

== Track listing ==
All songs written by James Taylor except where noted.

1. "September Grass" (John I. Sheldon) – 4:51
2. "October Road" – 3:57
3. "On the 4th of July" – 3:25
4. "Whenever You're Ready" – 4:14
5. "Belfast to Boston" – 4:16
6. "Mean Old Man" – 3:44
7. "My Traveling Star" – 3:55
8. "Raised Up Family" – 4:40
9. "Carry Me on My Way" – 4:30
10. "Caroline I See You" – 4:58
11. "Baby Buffalo" – 4:50
12. "Have Yourself a Merry Little Christmas" (Hugh Martin, Ralph Blane) – 3:50

Included on the second disc of the "limited edition" two-disc version:

1. "Don't Let Me Be Lonely Tonight" – 4:43 won the Best Male Pop Vocal Performance at the 44th Grammy Awards in 2002.
2. "Benjamin" (J. Taylor, composed in 1976 or 1977 as a tribute/lullaby to his new-coming or -born son. First released by David Sanborn on Promise Me the Moon in December 1977) – 3:30
3. "Sailing to Philadelphia" (Mark Knopfler) – 5:28

== Charts ==
=== Weekly charts ===
Chart (2002)	Peak position
Australian Albums (ARIA)	48
Dutch Albums (Album Top 100)	40
German Albums (Offizielle Top 100)	71
Italian Albums (FIMI)	10
Norwegian Albums (VG-lista)	33
UK Albums (Official Charts)	39
US Billboard 200	4

=== Year-end charts ===
Chart (2002)	Position
US Billboard 200	106

== Personnel ==
- James Taylor – lead vocals, guitars, backing vocals (1, 3, 7, 11), harmony vocals (2)
- Rob Mounsey – keyboards (1, 7), synthesizers (3, 6), synth bagpipes (5), penny whistle (5), percussion (5), string pad (10, 12), string arrangements (12)
- M. Hans Liebert – synth conga (1, 4), acoustic piano (5), synth percussion (8)
- Clifford Carter – organ (2), keyboards (3), acoustic piano intro (10), Rhodes (10), synth organ (11), synth pad (12)
- Greg Phillinganes – keyboards (4, 5, 8)
- Larry Goldings – acoustic piano (6, 12)
- Robbie Kilgore – acoustic piano (10)
- John Sheldon – guitar harmonics (1)
- Ry Cooder – lead guitar (2)
- Michael Landau – rhythm guitar (2), electric guitar (3, 4), gut-string guitar (3), guitars (8, 9), guitar solo (9)
- John Pizzarelli – guitars (6, 12)
- Mark Knopfler – guitar, lead vocals (track 3, CD 2)
- Jimmy Johnson – bass guitar
- Steve Gadd – drums
- Luis Conte – percussion (2–4, 7–9, 11)
- Michael Brecker – saxophones (2), (track 1, CD 2)
- Lou Marini – saxophone (4, 8)
- Harry Allen – tenor saxophone (12)
- Walt Fowler – trumpet (4, 8)
- Richard Sebring – French horn (5)
- Tommy Morgan – harmonica (10)
- Dave Grusin – string arrangements and conductor (6, 7, 10)
- Ralph Morrison III – concertmaster (6, 7, 10)
- Stephen Erdody – cello (6, 7, 10)
- Paula Hochhalter – cello (6, 7, 10)
- Yo-Yo Ma – cello (track 2, CD 2)
- Edgar Meyer – double bass (track 2, CD 2)
- Karen Bakunin – viola (6, 7, 10)
- Brian Dembow – viola (6, 7, 10)
- Carrie Holzman-Little – viola (6, 7, 10)
- Stuart Duncan – violin solo (2, 7)
- Bruce Dukov – violin (6, 7, 10)
- Julie Ann Gigante – violin (6, 7, 10)
- Alan Grunfeld – violin (6, 7, 10)
- Tamara Hatwan – violin (6, 7, 10)
- Karen Jones – violin (6, 7, 10)
- Natalie Leggett – violin (6, 7, 10)
- Liane Mautner – violin (6, 7, 10)
- Robin Olson – violin (6, 7, 10)
- Margaret Wooten – violin (6, 7, 10)
- Kenneth Yerke – violin (6, 7, 10)
- Cenovia Cummins – violin (12)
- Richard Sortomme – violin (12)
- Donna Tecco – violin (12)
- Belinda Whitney – violin (12)
- Mark O'Connor – violin (track 2, CD 2)
- David Lasley – backing vocals (1, 3, 4, 8), harmony vocals (2), chorus (5)
- Kate Markowitz – backing vocals (1, 3, 4, 8), chorus (5)
- Arnold McCuller – backing vocals (1, 3, 4, 8), harmony vocals (2), chorus (5)
- Caroline Taylor – backing vocals (1)
- Chiara Civello – backing vocals (3)
- Michael Eisenstein – chorus (5)
- Nina Gordon – chorus (5)
- Josh Lattanzi – chorus (5)
- Steve Scully – chorus (5)
- Sally Taylor – backing vocals (7, 11)
- Andrea Zonn – violin (12), backing vocals (1, 3, 4, 8), chorus (5)

== Production ==
- Producer – Russ Titelman
- Production Coordinator – JoAnn Tominaga
- Engineer – Dave O’Donnell
- Additional Engineers – Mark Howard and M. Hans Liebert
- Assistant Engineers – Matt Beaudoin, Jimmy Hoyson, M. Hans Liebert, Bruce MacFarlane, Ben Parrish, Joe Prins, Keith Shortreed, Rafi Sofer, Joe Wormer and Luke Yaeger.
- Recorded at Linden Oaks Studios (Rochester, NY); Right Track Recording, Clinton Recording Studio, Secret Studio and Flying Monkey Studio (New York, NY); Signal Path Studios (Nashville, TN); Q Division Studios (Somerville, MA); The Village Recorder (Los Angeles, CA); Capitol Studios (Hollywood, CA).
- Mixed by Dave O’Donnell and Russ Titelman at Right Track Recording.
- Mix Assistant – Ryan Smith
- Mastered by Ted Jensen at Sterling Sound (New York, NY).
- Cover Consultant – Stephanie Mauer
- Art Direction – Gail Marowitz
- Design – Giulio Turturro
- Photography – Sante D’Orazio, Craig Nelson and Russ Titelman.
- Personal Assistant – Jessica Byrne Kusmin
- Management – Gary Borman and Barbara Rose for Borman Entertainment.
