= Just a Stone's Throw Away =

Studio album by Valerie Carter
- Released: 1977
- Recorded: 1976
- Studio: Wally Heider Recording (San Francisco); Sunset Sound Recorders; Hollywood Sound Recorders; Westlake Audio (Los Angeles)
- Genre: Rock
- Length: 33:25
- Label: Columbia
- Producer: George Massenburg; Lowell George; Maurice White

Valerie Carter chronology
Just a Stone's Throw Away (1977)	Wild Child (1978)

Professional ratings
Review scores
Source	Rating
Allmusic	4/5 stars
Orlando Sentinel	4/5 stars
New York Times	(favourable)

Just a Stone's Throw Away is Valerie Carter's first full-length solo album. It features guest appearances from artists such as Maurice White, Linda Ronstadt, Jackson Browne and Deniece Williams. The album was finally reissued in full as part of the 2019 compilation Ooh Child - The Columbia Years on Cherry Tree Records.

== Critical reception ==
AllMusic's Rob Caldwell writes, "The album is at once funky and folksy, blending a variety of styles, from the haunting acoustic sounds of "Face of Appalachia" to the jazzy blues of "Back to Blue Some More.""

Parry Gettelman of The Orlando Sentinel gives the album 4 out of 5 stars as well, and says, "Carter's voice has a wonderful delicacy but doesn't lack for power or soul. She captures all the nuances of the R&B; classic "Ooh Child," for instance."

The New York Times called Just a Stone's Throw Away "a record that ranges from lovelorn Los Angeles country‐rock ballads to bluegrassy folk to rambling funk, and the legitimate quest on whether Miss Carter holds up her end in all of this. To this taste she does, most charmingly; it is her presence that links together all these disparate styles and talents."

Blue Desert's review says, "Her first solo album, Just a Stone’s Throw Away, featured an impressive array of guest artists from the 1970s Southern California music scene. The album was well-received and garnered favorable reviews, plus an opening slot for the Eagles in Europe."

Charles Donovan writes in an article for Pop Matters that, "Just a Stone's Throw Away (produced by Lowell George, Maurice White and George Massenburg in 1977), has become something of a cult favorite, despite not breaking through on a massive scale at the time of its release. It's an effective exposition of all the sides of her talent."

In his article announcing the death of Valerie Carter, Paul Guzzo of The Tampa Bay Times remarked, "Known for a soulful, sultry and smoky voice and for being adept at soul, rock, pop and folk, Valerie Carter released four solo albums, most notably her 1977 debut, Just a Stone's Throw Away. That album also featured Jackson Browne, Linda Ronstadt and Earth Wind and Fire, included the songs "Ooh Child" and "Face of Appalachia" and got her booked as the opening act for the Eagles during a European tour."

The Round Place in the Middle writes, "Valerie Carter had the misfortune to be born with lead singer talent, leading lady looks and the soul of a woman who preferred remaining in the shadows. Absent the first two qualities, she would have been left alone…and probably lived a much happier and longer life. Since she had those qualities in abundance, she was pushed to the front early and often." and "Just a Stone’s Throw Away, in particular, spent a lot of time on my turntable in the eighties."

Al Kooper of The Morton Report remarks that, "Valerie was in a class by herself back then and these two albums became constant companions. The first one is called Just a Stone's Throw Away and her two backup bands are Little Feat and Earth Wind & Fire. The second album is called Wild Child and the backing band is primarily members of Toto. This is everlasting greatness done perfectly."

Echoes in the Wind Archives says of the album, "So what to make of Just A Stone's Throw Away? Well, like a lot of the records that were coming out of L.A. at the time, it can be a little too slick at moments. But it has other moments that are very nice, too."

- See original reviews for full articles. Links can be found in the references section of this article.

== Track listing ==
Side One
No.	Title	Writer(s)	Length
1.	"Ooh Child" (used in the 1979 movie Over the Edge)	Stan Vincent	2:56
2.	"Ringing Doorbells In The Rain"	Valerie Carter, Ron Koss	2:40
3.	"Heartache"	Lowell George, Ivan Ulz	2:55
4.	"Face of Appalachia"	George, John Sebastian	4:15
5.	"So, So, Happy"	Skip Scarborough	3:42

Side Two
No.	Title	Writer(s)	Length
6.	"A Stone's Throw Away"	Barbara Keith, Doug Tibbles	3:59
7.	"Cowboy Angel"	Carter, George	3:51
8.	"City Lights"	Maurice White, Larry Dunn, Verdine White, Al McKay, Fred White	3:18
9.	"Back to Blue Some More"	Carter, George, William Payne	5:49
Total length:			33:25

== Musicians ==
- Valerie Carter – lead vocals
- William Payne, Lowell George, Jeff Porcaro, Bob Glaub, Fred Tackett, Samuel Clayton, Charles Rainey, John Hall, Ernest Watts, Tom Jans, Herb Pedersen, Mike Utley, John Sebastian, Jackson Browne, Oscar Brashear, Mike Harris, Louis Satterfield, Don Myrick, David Campbell, Larry Dunn, Al McKay, Verdine White, Fred White, Andrew Woolfolk, Jerry Peters, Skip Scarborough, George Bohanon, Paul Barrere, Colin Cameron – musicians
- Linda Ronstadt, Deniece Williams, Herb Pedersen, Samuel Clayton, Maurice White, Lowell George – vocals

== Production ==
- Producer, Engineer: George Massenburg
- Co-producer: Lowell George (tracks 6, 7), Maurice White (tracks 5, 8)
- Photography: Elliot Gilbert
- Assistant Engineers: Fran Tate, Richard Goodman, Dean Rod, Reed Stanley, Kent Nebergall, Jack Rouben
- Mastered at the Mastering Lab by Mike Reese
- Recorded at Wally Heider Recording, Sunset Sound Recorders, Hollywood Sound Recorders, Westlake Audio, Los Angeles, 1976

All track information and credits were verified from the LP liner notes.
