= Only One (James Taylor song) =

Single by James Taylor

from the album That's Why I'm Here
- B-side: "Mona"
- Released: January 1986
- Studio: Right Track (New York City)
- Genre: Soft rock
- Length: 4:19
- Label: Columbia
- Songwriter: James Taylor
- Producers: Frank Filipetti; James Taylor

James Taylor singles chronology
"Everyday" (1986)	"Only One" (1986)	"That's Why I'm Here" (1986)

"Only One" is a song written and performed by the American singer-songwriter James Taylor. The song was included on his 1985 studio album, That's Why I'm Here. The following year, it was released as the album's second single and reached the top ten of the US and Canadian adult contemporary charts. During the week of January 23, 1986, "Only One" was the most added song to US adult contemporary radio stations according to Radio & Records. That same week, 58% of adult contemporary radio stations reporting to the publication had included the song in their playlists.

Taylor wrote "Only One" for his second wife, Kathryn Walker. He called it a "nice sort of anthem, a sweet love song written as a kind of Valentine for Kathryn, because that was around the time I met her." The song also features backing vocals from Joni Mitchell and Don Henley.

== Critical reception ==
Billboard labeled the song as a "potential country-crossover" and said that Taylor's "untrendy sound makes contemporary sense to a generation weaned on his records." Cashbox felt that Taylor "broke no new ground" with "Only One", but said that the song "should re-confirm Taylor as one of America's preeminent singer-songwriters."

== Personnel ==
- James Taylor – lead vocals, guitar
- Don Henley – backing vocals
- Joni Mitchell – backing vocals
- David Lasley – backing vocals
- Tony Levin – bass
- Bill Payne – keyboards
- Don Grolnick – keyboards
- Russ Kunkel – drums
- Jimmy Maelen – percussion

== Chart performance ==
Chart (1986)	Peak position
Australia (Kent Music Report)	62
Canada Adult Contemporary (RPM)	3
US Adult Contemporary (Billboard)	6
US Hot Country Songs (Billboard)	80
