= Clifford Carter =

American keyboardist

- Genres: Pop rock; progressive rock; R&B
- Occupations: Musician; songwriter
- Instruments: Keyboards; synthesizer; analog synthesizer; programming; vocals

Clifford Carter (born August 10, 1952) is an American keyboardist, musical director, composer and arranger.

Carter is known for his performances with such artists as James Taylor, Bruce Springsteen, Paul Simon, Rosanne Cash, Michael Franks, Art Garfunkel, Cyndi Lauper, Idina Menzel, Patti Scialfa, Shunzo Ohno, Linda Ronstadt, Susana Raya, Herbie Mann and as a member of the groups Elements, Grace Pool, and the 24th Street Band.

In 1993, he released a solo album, Walkin' into the Sun, which featured nine of his own compositions. The album is a combination of instrumental and vocally-driven music.

In 2010, Carter was a featured pianist at Carnegie Hall, performing 'Too Hot To Handel' with the Baltimore Symphony Orchestra, conducted by Marin Alsop.

== Discography ==
=== Solo albums ===
- Walkin' into the Sun — (1993)

=== Selected credits with other artists ===
- Rory Block — I'm Every Woman — (2002)
- Rosanne Cash — Interiors — (1990)
- Natalie Cole:
  - Snowfall on the Sahara — (1999)
  - Greatest Hits, Vol. 1 — (2000)
- Mark Egan:
  - Mosaic — (1985)
  - Blown Away; (1985)
  - Beyond Words — (1990)
  - Freedom Town — (2001)
- Bill Evans
  - The Alternative Man– (1985)
- Michael Franks:
  - Skin Dive — (1985)
  - Camera Never Lies — (1987)
  - Michael Franks Anthology: The Art of Love — (2003)
- Morgana King:
  - This Is Always — (1992)
  - Every Once in a While — (1997)
- Yusef Lateef:
  - Autophysiopsychic (CTI, 1977)
- Chuck Loeb
  - Magic Fingers (DMP, 1989) with Andy LaVerne
  - Moon, the Stars & the Setting Sun (1998)
- Michael Manring — Drastic Measures — (1991)
- Amanda McBroom — Waiting Heart — (1997)
- Patti Scialfa — 23rd Street Lullaby — (2004)
- Paul Simon — You're the One — (2000)
- Jeremy Steig
  - Firefly (CTI, 1977)
- James Taylor:
  - That's Why I'm Here — (1985)
  - Never Die Young — (1988)
  - New Moon Shine — (1991)
  - Live — (1993)
  - Best Live — (1994)
  - Hourglass — (1997)
  - Greatest Hits, Vol. 2 — (2000)
  - October Road — (2002)
- Kate Taylor — Beautiful Road — (2003)
- Village People — Live and Sleazy — (1979)
- Peter Criss — One for All (2007)
- Original Soundtracks:
  - A Chorus Line — (1985)

== See also ==
- List of ambient music artists
