= That's Why I'm Here =

Studio album by James Taylor
- Released: October 1985
- Studios: Right Track (New York City); AIR (Salem, Montserrat)
- Genre: Soft rock
- Length: 36:26
- Label: Columbia/Legacy
- Producers: Peter Asher; Frank Filipetti; James Taylor

James Taylor chronology
Dad Loves His Work (1981)	That's Why I'm Here (1985)	Classic Songs (1987)

Singles from That's Why I'm Here
- 1. "Everyday" Released: October 1985; 2. "Only One" Released: January 1986; 3. "That's Why I'm Here" Released: April 1986; 4. "Only a Dream in Rio" Released: August 1986

That's Why I'm Here is the eleventh studio album by singer-songwriter James Taylor released in 1985, four years after his previous effort, Dad Loves His Work. The album contains a version of Buddy Holly's "Everyday", as well as the participation of several singers, including Don Henley, Joni Mitchell, Graham Nash and Deniece Williams. "My Romance" was not on the LP or cassette version. "Only One" peaked at number 6 on the US Adult Contemporary chart and at number 3 in Canada.

== Background ==
The recording sessions for That's Why I'm Here began a couple years prior to the album's release when Taylor recorded some songs in Montserrat. Taylor largely deemed the material from these sessions unsatisfactory, calling it a "half-hearted attempt at starting this thing". "Everyday" and "Turn Away" were generated from these sessions and ultimately appeared on the album. He later completed the album after determining that it was "long overdue", adding that "when we did get it in, it felt like the right time [and] really went quite quickly."

== Critical reception ==
Professional ratings
Review scores
Source	Rating
AllMusic	3.5/5 stars
Encyclopedia of Popular Music	4/5 stars
MusicHound	2/5
Rolling Stone	(favorable)
The Rolling Stone Album Guide	2/5 stars

Billboard called the album "another set of fine originals spiced with cover versions of a pair of carefully chosen oldies". In its review of the album, Cashbox said that Taylor had "refined his music to artful songwriting", with songs such as the title track and "Everyday" possessing a "pleasing familiarity".

Discussing the title track, Billboards review stated, "Taylor's calm manner and breezy, light rock melody belie some fairly complex conclusions in this autobiographical statement." In regard to "Only One," Cashbox remarked, "Taylor breaks no new ground with this single, but his pure voice and beautiful sense of melody and harmony will be welcome," and said the album's title track is "a happy celebration of the artist's years as public property."

== Track listing ==
All tracks are written by James Taylor, except where noted.

Side one
No.	Title	Writer(s)	Length
1.	"That's Why I'm Here"		3:37
2.	"Song for You Far Away"		2:52
3.	"Only a Dream in Rio"	Taylor; Jim Maraniss (Note: Portuguese translation)	4:58
4.	"Turn Away"		3:20
5.	"Going Around One More Time"	Livingston Taylor	3:22
Total length:			18:09

Side two
No.	Title	Writer(s)	Length
1.	"Everyday"	Buddy Holly; Norman Petty	3:14
2.	"Limousine Driver"		3:48
3.	"Only One"		4:19
4.	"Mona"		2:48
5.	"(The Man Who Shot) Liberty Valance"	Burt Bacharach; Hal David	3:44
6.	"That's Why I'm Here (Reprise)"		0:24
Total length:			18:17

CD and digital bonus track
No.	Title	Writer(s)	Length
6.	"My Romance"	Lorenz Hart; Richard Rodgers	2:46
Total length:			39:12

== Personnel ==
=== Musicians ===
(keyed to vinyl)

- James Taylor – vocals, guitars
- Clifford Carter – keyboards (1, 4)
- Don Grolnick – keyboards (1, 8)
- Bill Payne – keyboards (1, 2, 4–10)
- Dan Dugmore – steel guitar (2, 9), guitars (6)
- Jeff Pevar – guitars (4, 7)
- Tony Levin – bass (1–3, 5, 7–10)
- Leland Sklar – bass (4, 6)
- Russ Kunkel – drums (1–3, 5, 7–10)
- Rick Shlosser – drums (4, 6)
- Jimmy Maelen – percussion (1, 2, 5, 7, 8)
- Airto Moreira – percussion (3)
- Starz Vanderlocket – percussion (4)
- Greg "Fingers" Taylor – harmonica (5, 7)
- David Sanborn – saxophone (1, 7, 10)
- Michael Brecker – saxophone (7)
- Barry Rogers – trombone (7)
- Randy Brecker – trumpet (7)
- Kenny Kosek – violin (7, 10)

Background vocalists

- David Lasley – backing vocals (1, 4, 8)
- James Taylor – backing vocals (1, 2, 4–6, 9, 10)
- Deniece Williams – backing vocals (1)
- Randy Brecker – backing vocals (3)
- Eliane Elias (credited as Elaine Eliaf) – backing vocals (3)
- Kenia Gould – backing vocals (3)
- Zbeto – backing vocals (3)
- Peter Asher – backing vocals (4)
- Rosemary Butler – backing vocals (4, 6)
- Frank Filipetti – backing vocals (4)
- Arnold McCuller – backing vocals (4, 6)
- Rory Dodd – backing vocals (5)
- Eric Troyer – backing vocals (5)
- Don Henley – backing vocals (8)
- Joni Mitchell – backing vocals (8)
- Graham Nash – backing vocals (9, 10)

=== Production ===
- James Taylor – producer
- Frank Filipetti – producer, recording, mixing
- Moira Marquis – assistant engineer
- Billy Miranda – assistant engineer
- Renatta Blauer – assistant engineer (4, 6)
- Ted Jensen – mastering at Sterling Sound (New York, NY)
- Graham Holmes – production assistant
- Edd Kolakowski – production assistant
- John Berg – art direction
- Andrew Brucker – front cover photography
- Patricia Caulfield – back cover photography

== Charts ==
=== Weekly charts ===
Chart (1985/86)	Peak position
Australia (Kent Music Report)	24
United States Billboard 200	34

=== Year-end charts ===
Chart (1986)	Position
U.S. Billboard 200	93

== Certifications ==
Region	Certification	Certified units/sales
United States (RIAA)	Platinum	1,000,000^{^}
^{^} Shipments figures based on certification alone.
