= Flag (James Taylor album) =

Studio album by James Taylor
- Released: May 1, 1979
- Recorded: January 4 – March 25, 1979
- Studio: Sound Factory (Hollywood)
- Genre: Rock
- Length: 42:52
- Label: Columbia/Legacy
- Producer: Peter Asher

James Taylor chronology
JT (1977)	Flag (1979)	Dad Loves His Work (1981)

Singles from Flag
- 1. "Up on the Roof" Released: May 1979

Flag is the ninth studio album by American singer-songwriter James Taylor released on May 1, 1979. The album included songs ("Millworker", "Brother Trucker") from Taylor's music score to Stephen Schwartz's Broadway musical, Working, based on the book by Studs Terkel.

The album was not well received, but it did provide a hit in Taylor's cover version of the Gerry Goffin–Carole King composition "Up on the Roof".

"Rainy Day Man", which first appeared on Taylor's self-titled debut album, was re-recorded.

The signal flag that makes up the cover of the album is a modified form of "O (Oscar)", standing for man overboard.

On the May 12, 1979, episode of Saturday Night Live, Taylor was the musical guest, and performed three songs from the album, "Up on the Roof", "Millworker", and "Johnnie Comes Back".

== Critical reception ==
Professional ratings
Review scores
Source	Rating
AllMusic	3.5/5 stars
Christgau's Record Guide	C+
The Encyclopedia of Popular Music	2/5 stars
MusicHound Rock	3.5/5 stars
Rolling Stone	(favorable)
The Rolling Stone Album Guide	2/5 stars

The New York Times wrote that Taylor's "vulnerable tenor and the glossy production Peter Asher gives his record conspire to court blandness."

== Track listing ==
All songs by James Taylor unless otherwise noted.

Side one

1. "Company Man" – 3:47
2. "Johnnie Comes Back" – 3:55
3. "Day Tripper" (John Lennon, Paul McCartney) – 4:25
4. "I Will Not Lie for You" – 3:16
5. "Brother Trucker" – 4:01
6. "Is That the Way You Look?" – 1:59

Side two

1. "B.S.U.R. (S.U.C.S.I.M.I.M.)" – 3:23
2. "Rainy Day Man" (Taylor, Zach Wiesner) – 3:02
3. "Millworker" – 3:52
4. "Up on the Roof" (Gerry Goffin, Carole King) – 4:21
5. "Chanson Française" – 2:05
6. "Sleep Come Free Me" – 4:43

== Personnel ==
- James Taylor – lead vocals, acoustic guitars, backing vocals (1, 3–6)
- Don Grolnick – clavinet (1–3, 5), electric piano (1, 5, 7, 8, 11, 12), organ (4, 7, 8, 12), ARP String Ensemble (5), acoustic piano (9), harmonium (9), shoe (9)
- Ralph Schuckett – organ (2)
- Danny Kortchmar – electric guitars (1–5, 7, 8, 10, 12)
- Waddy Wachtel – electric guitars (2, 10), acoustic guitars (4)
- Dan Dugmore – pedal steel guitar (5)
- Leland Sklar – bass (1–8, 10–12)
- Russ Kunkel – drums (1–8, 10–12), cowbell (3), timbales (3), congas (11)
- Steve Forman – tambourine (2), timbales (2), Mazda phone (5), cowbell (7), congas (8), waterphone (8)
- Peter Asher – timbales (4), shaker (5), backing vocals (7)
- David Sanborn – saxophone (4)
- Jesse Levy – cello (9)
- Louise Schulmann – viola (9)
- David Spinozza – string arrangements and conductor (3)
- Arif Mardin – string arrangements and conductor (10)
- Larry Touquet – cell door effects (12)
- Graham Nash – backing vocals (1)
- Alex Taylor – backing vocals (5)
- Carly Simon – backing vocals (7)
- David Lasley – backing vocals (8)
- Arnold McCuller – backing vocals (8)

== Production ==
- Producer – Peter Asher
- Engineer – Val Garay
- Assistant Engineers – Lincoln Clapp and George Ybarra
- Recorded and Mixed at The Sound Factory (Hollywood, California).
- Mastered by Doug Sax at The Mastering Lab (Hollywood, California).
- Art Direction and Design – John Kosh
- Photography – Mark Hanauer

== Charts ==
=== Weekly charts ===
Weekly chart performance for Flag
Chart (1979)	Peak position
Australian Albums (Kent Music Report)	18
Canada Top Albums/CDs (RPM)	9
New Zealand Albums (RMNZ)	50
Norwegian Albums (VG-lista)	17
US Billboard 200	10

=== Year-end charts ===
Year-end chart performance for Flag
Chart (1979)	Position
Canada Top Albums/CDs (RPM)	67
US Billboard 200	79
