= Copperline =

Single by James Taylor

from the album New Moon Shine
- B-side: "Slap Leather"; "Steamroller" (live)
- Released: 1991
- Recorded: June 1991
- Genre: Adult contemporary
- Length: 4:22
- Label: Columbia
- Songwriters: James Taylor; Reynolds Price
- Producers: Don Grolnick; Danny Kortchmar

James Taylor singles chronology
"Baby Boom Baby" (1988)	"Copperline" (1991)	"(I've Got to) Stop Thinkin' 'Bout That" (1991)

"Copperline" is a song by American singer-songwriter James Taylor, released in 1991 as the lead single from his thirteenth studio album New Moon Shine. The song was written by Taylor and poet Reynolds Price. Taylor has described the song as being "about home, about my father, about a childhood that was very peaceful, which is a rare thing today."

== Background ==
"Copperline" originated from an older song entitled "A Dog Named Blue"; after playing through the song's changes, Taylor created the line "down on Copperline" and developed the rest of the song from there.

== Charts ==
Chart (1991)	Peak position
Canada Top Singles (RPM)	43
Canada Adult Contemporary (RPM)	10
US Adult Contemporary (Billboard)	13
