= Up on the Roof (song) =

1962 single by the Drifters

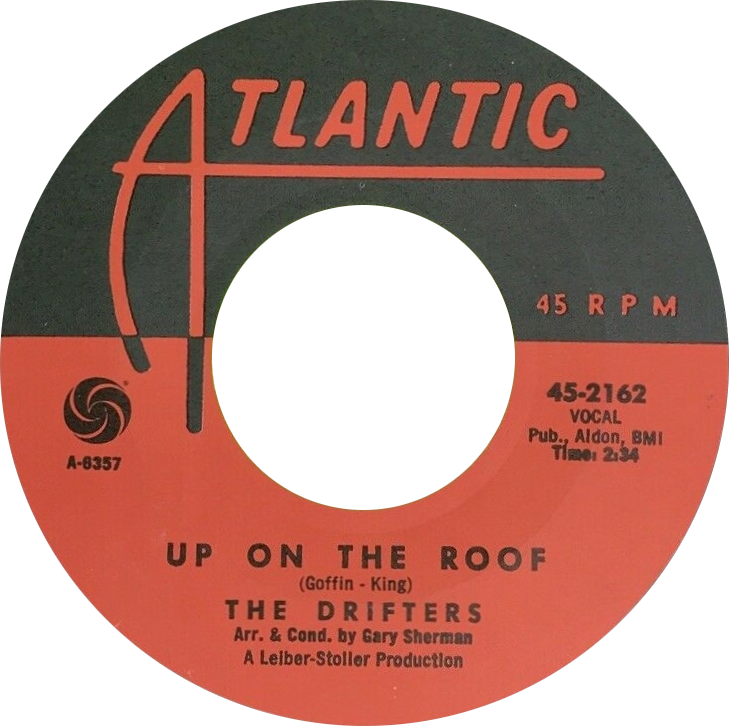
- Side A of the US single

Single by The Drifters

from the album Our Biggest Hits
- B-side: "Another Night with the Boys"
- Released: September 17, 1962
- Genre: R&B; soul; pop
- Length: 2:33
- Label: Atlantic
- Songwriters: Gerry Goffin and Carole King
- Producer: Leiber and Stoller

The Drifters singles chronology
"Sometimes I Wonder" (1962)	"Up on the Roof" (1962)	"On Broadway" (1963)

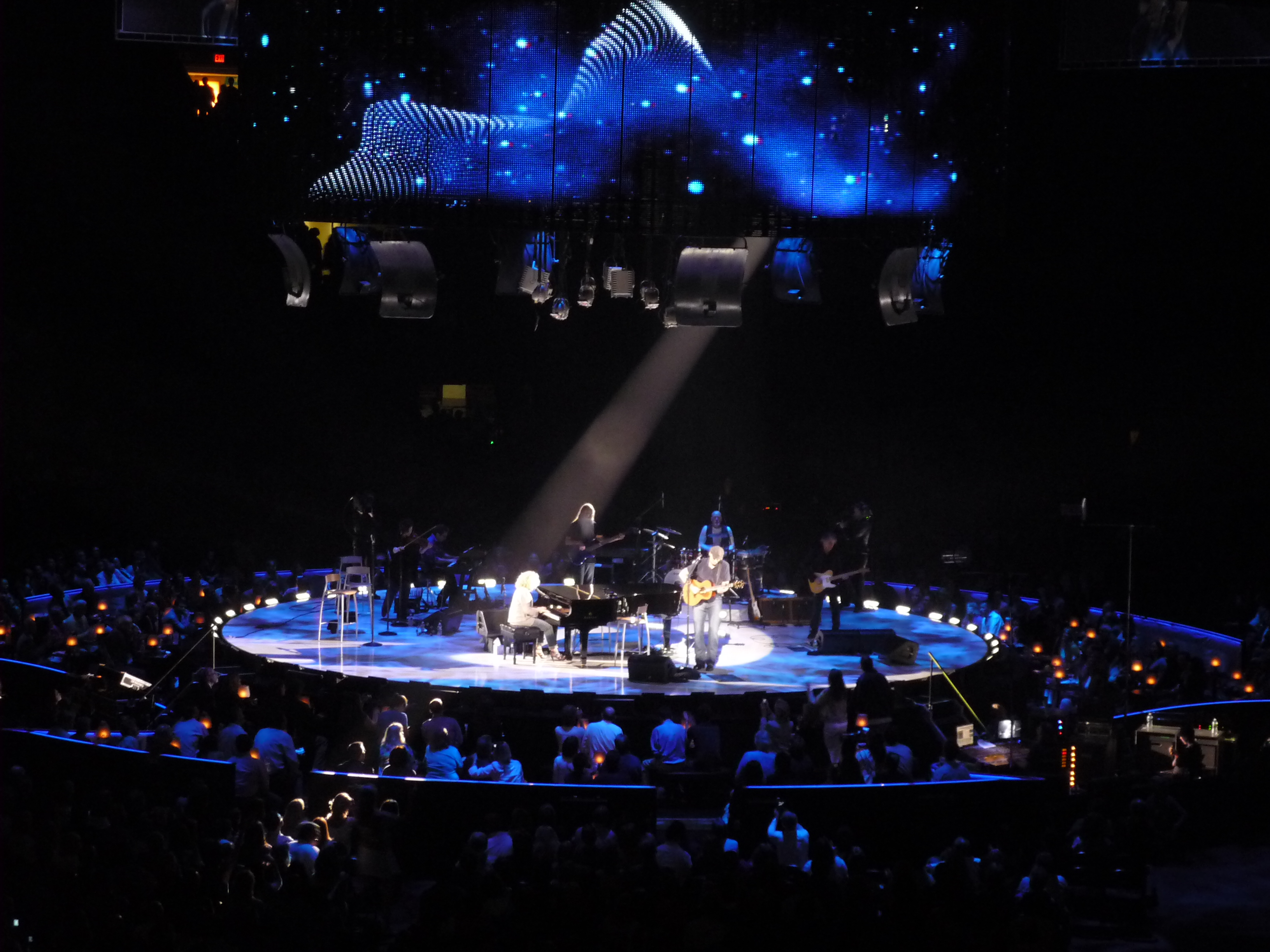
James Taylor and Carole King perform "Up on the Roof" together in 2010 during their Troubadour Reunion Tour.

"Up on the Roof" is a song written by Gerry Goffin and Carole King and recorded in 1962 by the Drifters. Released late that year, the disc became a major hit in early 1963, reaching number 5 on the U.S. pop singles chart and number 4 on the U.S. R&B singles chart. In the UK it was a top-ten success for singer Kenny Lynch, whose version was also released in 1962.

== Background ==
Gerry Goffin cited "Up on the Roof" as his all-time favorite of the lyrics he had written. Carole King suggested that he write lyrics for the tune, which had occurred to her while she was out driving; with King suggesting "My Secret Place" as the title, Goffin kept King's suggested focus of a haven, modifying it with his enthusiasm for the movie musical West Side Story, which contained several scenes set on the rooftops of Upper West Side tenements.

== Reception and legacy ==
The 1980 Rolling Stone Illustrated History of Rock & Roll described "Up on the Roof" as "in every way a remarkable pop song for 1962," and in particular said of the above lyric, "From the internal rhyme of 'stairs' and 'cares' to the image of ascending from the street to the stars by way of an apartment staircase, it's first-rate, sophisticated writing."

The melodic title riff was used in the Drifters version of "Under the Boardwalk", which is heard before the chorus of the song.

In April 2010, the Drifters' "Up on the Roof" was named number 114 on Rolling Stone's 500 Greatest Songs of All Time list. It is one of the Rock and Roll Hall of Fame's 500 Songs that Shaped Rock and Roll.

== Personnel ==
Credits are adapted from the liner notes of Atlantic Rhythm And Blues 1947–1974.

- Rudy Lewis – lead vocals
- Tommy Evans, Gene Pearson, Charlie Thomas – backing vocals
- Don Arnone, Bob Bushnell, Al Casamenti – guitars
- Ernie Hayes, Carole King – keyboards
- George Duvivier – bass
- Gary Chester – drums
- George Devens, Bobby Rosengarden – percussion
- Jimmy Nottingham, Jimmy Sedler – trumpets
- Jimmy Cleveland, Frank Sarraco – trombones
- Bert Keyes, Garry Sherman – arrangements

== James Taylor version ==
"Up on the Roof"

Single by James Taylor

from the album Flag
- B-side: "Chanson Française"
- Released: May 1979
- Recorded: Early 1979
- Studio: Sound Factory (Hollywood)
- Genre: Soft rock
- Length: 4:19
- Label: Columbia
- Songwriters: Gerry Goffin, Carole King
- Producer: Peter Asher

James Taylor singles chronology
"Honey Don't Leave L.A." (1978)	"Up on the Roof" (1979)	"Her Town Too" (1981)

James Taylor, who had played guitar on Carole King's cover of "Up on the Roof" and had duetted it with her at her Carnegie Hall concert of June 18, 1971, remade "Up on the Roof" for his 1979 album release Flag. Issued as the album's lead single, Taylor's version of "Up on the Roof" peaked at number 28 on the US Billboard Hot 100 in July 1979. In Canada, the single peaked at number 36, a position it held for four consecutive weeks.

In a 1986 interview, Taylor mentioned "Up on the Roof" when asked by the Gavin Report if there were any covers or remakes that provided him with "particular satisfaction".

=== Critical reception ===
Billboard thought that Taylor's cover "funkier" than his rendition of "You've Got a Friend", another song written by King. Cash Box said that the song "is perfectly suited to Taylor's tender tenor." Record World characterized the cover as receiving the "mellowest Taylor treatment, light on the instrumentation and perfect for beach blanket listening".

=== Personnel ===
- James Taylor – vocals, acoustic guitar
- Danny Kortchmar – electric guitar
- Waddy Wachtel – electric guitar
- Leland Sklar – bass guitar
- Russ Kunkel – drums
- Arif Mardin – string arrangements

=== Weekly charts ===
Chart (1979)	Peak position
Australia (Kent Music Report)	70
Canada Top Singles (RPM)	36
US Billboard Hot 100	28
US Adult Contemporary (Billboard)	7

== Other recordings ==
In the UK the Drifters' version of "Up on the Roof" failed to reach the Top 50, being surpassed by two British cover versions, sung by, respectively, Julie Grant and Kenny Lynch. The Kenny Lynch version, which largely replicated the Drifters' original, was the more successful, reaching number 10 in the UK. The Julie Grant version, which reached number 33 in the UK, reinvented the song as a Merseybeat number; its producer Tony Hatch would later be inspired to write Petula Clark's hit "Downtown", which was originally envisioned as being in the style of the Drifters, with whom Hatch hoped to place it.

The Cryan' Shames worked with producer Jim Golden and had their version of "Up on the Roof" released in 1968. It reached no. 85 on the Billboard charts.

Laura Nyro recorded "Up on the Roof" for her 1970 album Christmas and the Beads of Sweat and a single, affording Nyro her sole Hot 100 appearance with a number 92 peak. Nyro's version slows down the song's tempo and also omits the lyrics sung to the first of the original's three bridge sections. Also in 1970, Carole King herself recorded "Up on the Roof" for her solo recording debut Writer, from which it was issued as a single. Rolling Stone described King's version of "Up on the Roof" as "absolutely haunting," writing that "she transcends the ordinary production to speak directly to the listener."

"Up on the Roof" had its most successful UK incarnation via a 1995 remake by Robson & Jerome released as a double A-side coupled with their remake of "I Believe." Its arrangement hewed close to the Drifters' original; the accompanying music video showed the duo cavorting atop a midtown Manhattan skyscraper. The single reached number 1 on the UK Singles Chart and has sold 890,000 copies in the UK. In addition, "I Believe"/ "Up on the Roof" reached number 3 in Ireland and number 45 in the Netherlands.

== Certifications ==
Certifications and sales for "Up on the Roof"
Region	Certification	Certified units/sales
United Kingdom (BPI) Sales since 2005	Silver	200,000^{‡}
^{‡} Sales+streaming figures based on certification alone.
