= Arnold McCuller =

American singer (born 1950)

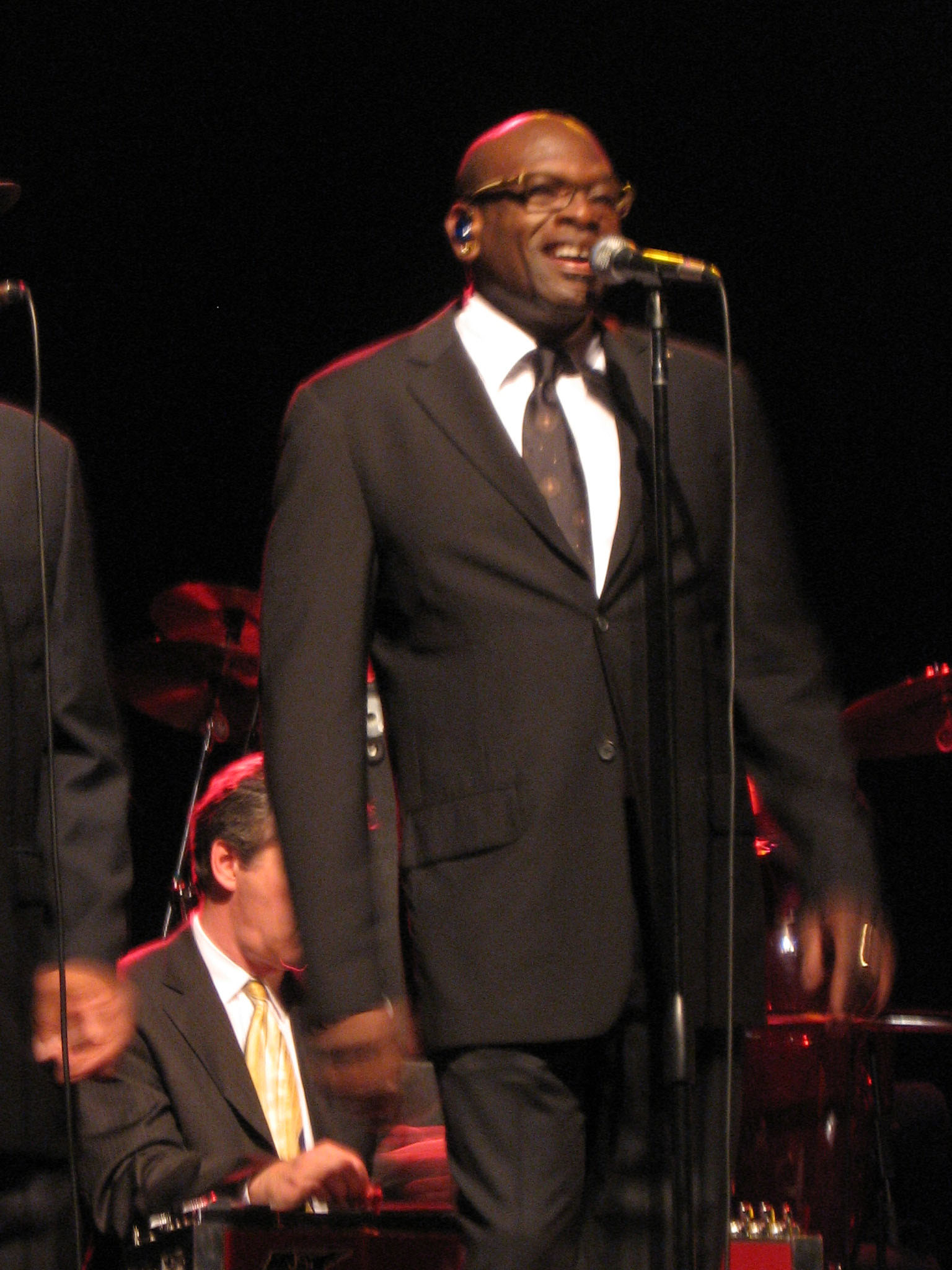
- McCuller performing with Lyle Lovett & His Large Band at the Orpheum Theatre in 2008

Background information
- Born: Arnold McCuller; August 26, 1950 (age 75); Cleveland, Ohio, U.S.
- Origin: Cleveland, Ohio
- Genres: Rock; R&B; blues; jazz; Latin
- Occupations: Musician, songwriter, record producer, actor
- Instrument: Vocalist
- Years active: 1974–present
- Label: What's Good
- Website: arnoldmcculler.com

Arnold McCuller (born August 26, 1950) is an American vocalist, songwriter, and record producer, born and raised in Cleveland, Ohio. He was active as a solo artist and session musician, but is perhaps best known for his work as a touring back-up singer with artists such as James Taylor, Linda Ronstadt, Phil Collins, Beck, Bonnie Raitt, and Todd Rundgren.

== Early life ==
McCuller began his career singing with the choral ensemble, the Prestonians, in Cleveland, Ohio. At 21, McCuller was an actor-singer with the Los Angeles company of “Hair” touring with the road company from 1971 until 1973.

In 1975, through the New York Community Choir, McCuller joined Phillip Ballou, Benny Diggs and Arthur Freeman as a member of the vocal group Revelation, releasing their debut album of the same name, on RSO Records.

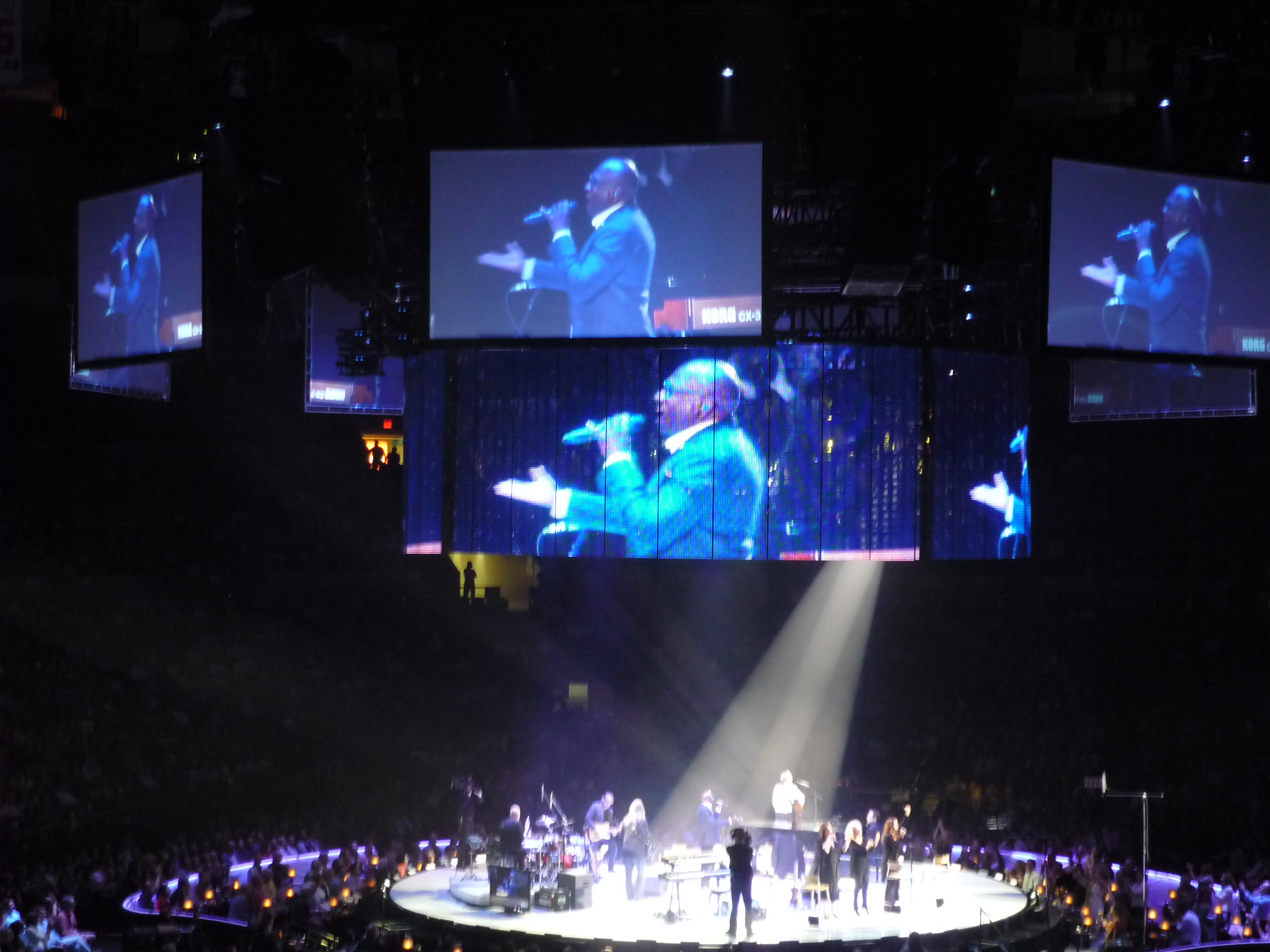
McCuller singing his coda part to "Shower the People" on the 2010 Troubadour Reunion Tour

== Music, film, and television career ==
McCuller toured for forty-five years with James Taylor and is an audience favorite for his featured vocal parts on the songs "Shower the People", "I Will Follow", and "Is That the Way You Look". He has also toured extensively with Phil Collins and is one of the main lead vocalists on the live version of "Easy Lover". In 2010 McCuller joined the Troubadour Reunion Tour supporting James Taylor and Carole King.

McCuller has had numerous acting parts in films, particularly in movies centered on music, such as American Hot Wax (1978) and The Hollywood Knights (1980). He appeared in the film The Sum of All Fears singing "The Star-Spangled Banner". Although he did not appear onscreen in Duets, his vocals were blended with those of actor Andre Braugher to make a composite singing voice for the character "Reggie Kane"; in the film, Reggie Kane sang with Paul Giamatti on "Try a Little Tenderness" and performed an a cappella version of "Free Bird".

McCuller also performed the song "Nowhere to Run" for the 1979 film The Warriors, which appears on the film's soundtrack (A&M Records); and was one of the four singers in the "guitar duel sequence" in the 1986 film Crossroads, with Ry Cooder.

== Discography ==
=== Solo albums ===
- A Part of Me That's You (1984) with David Benoit
- Exception to the Rule (1994)
- You Can't Go Back (1999)
- Exception to the Rule (2000) reissue (with fewer songs)
- Back to Front (2002)
- Live at the Baked Potato (2002)
- Circa 1990 (2003)
- Sabor (2009)
- The Present (2010)
- Soon as I Get Paid (2011)
- Back @ The Baked Potato Live 2015 (2015)
- Witness (2017)

=== with James Taylor ===
- Flag (1979)
- Dad Loves His Work (1981)
- That's Why I'm Here (1985)
- Never Die Young (1988)
- New Moon Shine (1991)
- (LIVE) (1993)
- Hourglass (1997)
- October Road (2002)
- At Christmas (2006)
- Covers (2008)
- Before This World (2015)
- American Standard (2020)

With many years of touring from 1977 to 2022; with the exception of 1990 (Phillip Ballou filled in), 1994 (Dorian Holley filled in), 2012 (Jim Gilstrap filled in with the exception of solo on "Shower the People"), and some of 2019 (Dorian Holley filled in at first and then both performed at Las Vegas & Tanglewood).

=== with Phil Collins ===
- Serious Hits... Live! (1990)
- Dance into the Light (1996)

=== with Lyle Lovett ===
- Joshua Judges Ruth (1992)
- I Love Everybody (1994)
- The Road to Ensenada (1996)
- It's Not Big It's Large (2007)

=== Film and television soundtracks ===
- The Warriors [Soundtrack to the Motion Picture] (1979)
- The Thief and the Cobbler (1993) contributed vocals to end credits theme, "Am I Feeling Love?"
- Duets [Soundtrack to the Motion Picture] (2000)
- Hairspray [Soundtrack to the Motion Picture] (2007)
- Chiquititas, Vol. 2 (2013)
