= The Essential James Taylor =

Compilation album by James Taylor
- Released: October 29, 2013
- Genre: Folk
- Label: Columbia; Legacy
- Producer: Bill Inglot (Note: Inglot is credited as the "compilation producer". The original recordings are produced by: Peter Asher, Steven Epstein, Frank Filipetti, Don Grolnick, George Massenburg, Dave O'Donnell, David Spinozza, James Taylor, Russ Titelman, and Lenny Waronker.)

James Taylor chronology
Amchitka (2009)	The Essential James Taylor (2013)	Before This World (2015)

The Essential James Taylor is a compilation album by American singer-songwriter James Taylor. It was released on October 29, 2013, on Columbia Records and Legacy Recordings as part of their "Essential" series in the US, and on Warner Bros. Records in the EU and Australia. The album compiles tracks spanning Taylor's second album Sweet Baby James (1970) to October Road (2002).

== Reception ==
AllMusic gave the album four stars out of five. In their review, Matt Collar referred to the album as a "superb overview" of Taylor's career. Joe Marchese of The Second Disc also praised the compilation, calling it "a nicely-curated mix of big hits and less familiar gems". While Marchese did lament the exclusion of material from Taylor's first album alongside other select tracks from his catalogue, he still found it to be the "most comprehensive" retrospective of his work.

Writing for American Songwriter, Hal Horowitz gave the album a rating of 2.5 out of 5, expressing disappointment with the relatively short length of the compilation. Additionally, he found its release to be unnecessary, feeling that Taylor's previous three compilations–Greatest Hits (1976), Greatest Hits Volume 2 (2000), and The Best of James Taylor (2003)–already did the same job as The Essential.

== Track listing ==
All tracks are written by James Taylor, except where noted.

Disc one
No.	Title	Original release	Length
1.	"Sweet Baby James"	Sweet Baby James (1970)	2:51
2.	"Fire and Rain"	Sweet Baby James	3:23
3.	"Long Ago and Far Away"	Mud Slide Slim and the Blue Horizon (1971)	3:21
4.	"You've Got a Friend" (Carole King)	Mud Slide Slim and the Blue Horizon	4:29
5.	"Don't Let Me Be Lonely Tonight"	One Man Dog (1972)	2:35
6.	"Walking Man"	Walking Man (1974)	3:33
7.	"How Sweet It Is (To Be Loved By You)" (Holland–Dozier–Holland)	Gorilla (1975)	3:35
8.	"Mexico"	Gorilla	2:59
9.	"Shower the People"	In the Pocket (1976)	4:32
10.	"Steamroller" (live)	Greatest Hits (1976)	5:19
11.	"Something in the Way She Moves"	Greatest Hits	3:10
12.	"Carolina in My Mind"	Greatest Hits	3:59
13.	"Handy Man" (Jimmy Jones, Otis Blackwell)	JT (1977)	3:16
14.	"Your Smiling Face"	JT	2:45
15.	"Honey Don't Leave L.A." (Danny Kortchmar)	JT	3:04

Disc two
No.	Title	Original release	Length
1.	"Millworker"	Flag (1979)	3:49
2.	"Her Town Too" (Taylor, JD Souther, Waddy Wachtel)	Dad Loves His Work (1981)	4:28
3.	"Everyday" (Buddy Holly, Norman Petty)	That's Why I'm Here (1985)	3:14
4.	"Only One"	That's Why I'm Here	4:19
5.	"Never Die Young"	Never Die Young (1988)	4:24
6.	"Copperline" (Taylor, Reynolds Price)	New Moon Shine (1991)	4:22
7.	"The Water is Wide" (traditional)	New Moon Shine	3:01
8.	"Country Road" (live)	Live (1993)	5:39
9.	"Secret O' Life" (live)	Live	3:45
10.	"Little More Time with You"	Hourglass (1997)	3:52
11.	"Another Day"	Hourglass	2:21
12.	"Hard Times Come Again No More" (with Yo-Yo Ma, Edgar Meyer, and Mark O'Connor) (Stephen Foster)	Appalachian Journey (2000)	3:40
13.	"Caroline I See You"	October Road (2002)	4:59
14.	"My Traveling Star" (live)	previously unreleased	4:13
15.	"You Can Close Your Eyes" (live)	previously unreleased	2:53

== Charts ==
Chart performance for The Essential James Taylor
Chart (2013–2020)	Peak position
UK Albums Chart (OCC)	50
US Americana/Folk Albums (Billboard)	8
