= The Best of James Taylor =

Greatest hits album by James Taylor
- Released: April 8, 2003
- Recorded: 1968–2003
- Genres: Folk rock, rock
- Length: 70:43
- Label: Warner Bros.
- Producers: Peter Asher, David Spinozza, Lenny Waronker, Russ Titelman, James Taylor, Frank Filipetti, Danny Kortchmar
- Compiler: David McLees

James Taylor chronology
October Road (2002)	The Best of James Taylor (2003)	A Christmas Album (2004)

Singles from The Best of James Taylor
- 1. "Bittersweet" Released: 2003

Professional ratings
Review scores
Source	Rating
AllMusic	5/5 stars
The Rolling Stone Album Guide	4/5 stars

The Best of James Taylor is the fourth compilation album by American singer-songwriter James Taylor released by Warner Bros. Records in 2003. The same album was released in Europe as You've Got a Friend: The Best of James Taylor.

The album emphasizes Taylor's recordings for the label; fourteen of the twenty tracks on the album are from his time with Warner Bros. It contains one previously unreleased track, "Bittersweet", recorded for this release. It entered the Billboard 200 album chart on April 26, 2003, at number 11, with sales of approximately 73,500 copies. It remained on the chart for 42 weeks. It was awarded a certified gold record on December 17, 2003, and a platinum record on April 15, 2005, by the RIAA.

== Track listing ==
All songs were written by James Taylor, except where noted.

1. "Something in the Way She Moves" – 2:27
2. "Sweet Baby James" – 2:53
3. "Fire and Rain" – 3:25
4. "Country Road" – 3:30
  - Single version, previously unreleased on any James Taylor album.
5. "You've Got a Friend" (Carole King) – 4:30
6. "You Can Close Your Eyes" – 2:32
7. "Long Ago and Far Away" – 2:22
8. "Don't Let Me Be Lonely Tonight" – 2:37
9. "Walking Man" – 3:35
10. "How Sweet It Is (To Be Loved by You)" (Brian Holland, Lamont Dozier, Eddie Holland) – 3:37
11. "Mexico" – 3:00
12. "Shower the People" – 4:33
13. "Golden Moments" – 3:32
14. "Steamroller" – 5:06
  - 1975 live version.
15. "Carolina in My Mind" – 4:00
  - 1976 version.
16. "Handy Man" (Otis Blackwell, Jimmy Jones) – 3:20
17. "Your Smiling Face" – 2:48
18. "Up on the Roof" (Gerry Goffin, King) – 4:22
19. "Only a Dream in Rio" – 5:03
20. "Bittersweet" (John Sheldon) – 3:44
  - A previously unreleased song, recorded specifically for this album in early 2003.

== Personnel ==
=== Musicians ===
- James Taylor – vocals, acoustic guitar, electric guitar
- Carole King – piano
- Red Rhodes – steel guitar (on "Sweet Baby James")
- John London – bass (on "Sweet Baby James")
- Bobby West – double bass (on "Fire and Rain")
- Russ Kunkel – drums, percussion
- Danny Kortchmar – electric and acoustic guitars, congas
- Leland Sklar – bass
- Joni Mitchell – background vocals
- Craig Doerge – piano (on "Don't Let Me Be Lonely Tonight")
- Michael Brecker – tenor saxophone (on "Don't Let Me Be Lonely Tonight")
- David Spinozza – electric and acoustic guitars (on "Walking Man")
- Kenneth Ascher – electric piano (on "Walking Man")
- Andy Muson – bass (on "Walking Man")
- Rick Marotta – drums (on "Walking Man")
- Ralph MacDonald – percussion (on "Walking Man")
- Carly Simon – harmony vocals
- Clarence McDonald – piano, Fender Rhodes, hornorgan
- Jim Keltner – drums (on "How Sweet It Is (To Be Loved by You)")
- David Sanborn – saxophone (on "How Sweet It Is (To Be Loved by You)")
- Nick DeCaro – hornorgan, voiceorgan
- David Crosby – harmony vocals (on "Mexico")
- Graham Nash – harmony vocals (on "Mexico")
- Milt Holland – percussion (on "Mexico")
- Gayle Levant – harp
- Victor Feldman – vibes, orchestra bells (on "Shower the People")
- Bobbye Hall – triangle (on "Golden Moments")
- Andrew Gold – background vocals, harmonium (on "Carolina in My Mind")
- Dan Dugmore – steel guitar (on "Carolina in My Mind")
- Byron Berline – fiddle (on "Carolina in My Mind")
- Leah Kunkel – background vocals (on "Handy Man")
- Waddy Wachtel – electric guitar (on "Up on the Roof")
- Randy Brecker – vocals (on "Only a Dream in Rio")
- Eliane Elias – vocals (on "Only a Dream in Rio")
- Kenia Gould – vocals (on "Only a Dream in Rio")
- Zbeto – vocals (on "Only a Dream in Rio")
- Bill Payne – keyboards (on "Only a Dream in Rio")
- Tony Levin – bass (on "Only a Dream in Rio")
- Airto Moreira – percussion (on "Only a Dream in Rio")
- Curtis King – vocals (on "Bittersweet")
- John Sheldon – guitar (on "Bittersweet")
- Clifford Carter – keyboards (on "Bittersweet")
- Willie Weeks – bass (on "Bittersweet")
- Steve Jordan – drums (on "Bittersweet")

=== Technical ===
- James Taylor – Record producer (on "Only a Dream in Rio"), liner notes
- Peter Asher – production
- David Spinozza – production (on "Walking Man")
- Lenny Waronker – production
- Russ Titelman – production
- Frank Filipetti – production (on "Only a Dream in Rio")
- Danny Kortchmar – production (on "Bittersweet")
- David McLees – compiler
- Bill Inglot – remastering, except "Bittersweet"
- Dan Hersch – remastering, except "Bittersweet"
- Ted Jensen – remastering (on "Bittersweet")

== Charts ==
=== Weekly charts ===
Chart (2003)	Peak position
Australian Albums (ARIA)	54
Irish Albums (IRMA)	9
New Zealand Albums (RMNZ)	11
Scottish Albums (Official Charts)	4
UK Albums (Official Charts)	4
US Billboard 200	11

=== Year-end charts ===
Chart (2003)	Position
UK Albums (OCC)	197
US Billboard 200	154

== Certifications ==
Region	Certification	Certified units/sales
Australia (ARIA)	Platinum	70,000^{^}
United Kingdom (BPI)	Gold	100,000^{^}
United States (RIAA)	Platinum	1,000,000^{^}
^{^} Shipments figures based on certification alone.
