= Night Owl (James Taylor song) =

1967 song

Single by The Flying Machine
- B-side: "Brighten Your Night with My Day"
- Released: 1967
- Recorded: Late 1966, Select Sound Studios, NYC
- Genre: Folk rock
- Length: 2:25
- Label: Rainy Day Records
- Songwriter: James Taylor
- Producers: Chip Taylor, Al Gorgoni

"Night Owl"

Song by James Taylor

from the album James Taylor
- Released: December 6, 1968
- Recorded: 1968 at Trident Studios, London
- Genre: Rock, R&B
- Length: 3:38
- Label: Apple Records
- Songwriter: James Taylor
- Producer: Peter Asher

"Night Owl" is a song written by James Taylor that was originally released as a single by Taylor's band the Flying Machine, which also included Danny Kortchmar in 1967. Taylor later rerecorded a solo version of the song for his Apple Records debut album James Taylor in 1968. Subsequently, the Flying Machine version was released on the album James Taylor and the Original Flying Machine. It has also been covered by such artists as Alex Taylor, Carly Simon and Anne Murray.

== James Taylor versions ==
"Night Owl" was inspired by the Night Owl Cafe in Greenwich Village in New York City, where the Flying Machine often performed. The Flying Machine version was released as a single backed by "Brighten Your Night with My Day." Taylor and the other group members were dissatisfied with their performance on the recording, considering it "mediocre." Although it got some regional radio play in the northeast United States, the label declined to fund further recordings by the band. Author Stephen Davis described the song as "a rollicking R&B number." Tony Orlando claims to have been particularly struck by the song. Taylor later rerecorded "Night Owl," along with several other songs he wrote for the Flying Machine, such as "Knocking 'Round the Zoo," for his self-titled solo debut album on Apple Records. Allmusic critic Lindsay Planer rated it as one of the "notable inclusions" on the James Taylor album. The James Taylor album included instrumental interludes between songs, and James Taylor biographer Timothy White describes the brass instruments that were used for the interlude introducing "Night Owl" as "ungainly" and sounding like the overture to a Broadway musical. White does feel that the brass instruments were used better accompanying the song itself.

In 1971, after Taylor gained popularity with the release of his second album Sweet Baby James, producer Chip Taylor issued Flying Machine demos including "Night Owl" on the album James Taylor and the Original Flying Machine. Author Ian Halperin complains that for the CD reissue of James Taylor and the Original Flying Machine Chip Taylor remixed the song and added bass guitar and percussion.

== Cover versions ==
James Taylor's brother Alex Taylor chose to include his own version of "Night Owl" on his 1971 debut album With Friends & Neighbors. James Taylor played guitar on this version. King Curtis played tenor saxophone. White describes Alex Taylor's version as "a steady-rocking version." Tuscaloosa News editor Ben Windham describes Alex Taylor's version as being very different from James Taylor's version, despite some similarity in their voices. He describes Alex Taylor's version as getting "an old-school soul treatment."

Anne Murray also covered "Night Owl" in 1971 on her album Talk It Over in the Morning. Allmusic critic Greg Adams describes her version as "funky." Billboard described Murray as being "at her best" on the song.

Carly Simon was dating James Taylor during the recording of her 1972 album No Secrets. She decided that she wanted to include one of Taylor's songs on the album. Producer Richard Perry chose "Night Owl" for her to cover, because "it was a funkier, bluesier tune than [Taylor's] more folk-oriented material." Paul McCartney, Linda McCartney, Doris Troy, Jimmy Ryan and Bonnie Bramlett provided the backing vocals for Simon's version of the song. Long time Rolling Stones collaborator Nicky Hopkins played piano, Jimmy Ryan played guitar, and Klaus Voormann and Bobby Keys also played on the song. Taylor was initially not entirely happy that Simon's version of the song sounded to him like an outtake from the Rolling Stones' recent album Exile on Main Street. Rolling Stone critic Stephen Holden regarded it as the second best song on No Secrets after the #1 hit "You're So Vain." High Fidelity regarded it as the best song on the album. Stereo Review called it a "scorching good version" of the song. Author Jami Bernard described Simon's "sexy growl" when singing the line "I'm a night owl, honey" as implying that "life was more interesting in the wee hours." Critic James Hunter described Simon's "whooping growls" on the song as a "triumph." Simon later included "Night Owl" on her compilation album The Best of Carly Simon.
