= Honey Don't Leave L.A. =

1976 single by Attitudes

Single by Attitudes

from the album Attitudes
- Released: 1976
- Recorded: 1975
- Genre: Soft rock
- Length: 3:12
- Label: Dark Horse
- Songwriter: Danny Kortchmar
- Producers: Attitudes, Lee Kiefer

Attitudes singles chronology
"Ain't Love Enough" (1975)	"Honey Don't Leave L.A." (1976)	"Sweet Summer Music" (1976)

"Honey Don't Leave L.A."
- Dutch cover

Single by James Taylor

from the album JT
- B-side: "Another Grey Morning"
- Released: February 1978
- Genre: Rock
- Length: 3:03
- Label: Columbia
- Songwriter: Danny Kortchmar
- Producer: Peter Asher

James Taylor singles chronology
"Your Smiling Face" (1977)	"Honey Don't Leave L.A." (1978)	"Up on the Roof" (1979)

"Honey Don't Leave L.A." is a song written by Danny Kortchmar. It was first recorded by Attitudes, a band consisting of Kortchmar, Paul Stallworth, Jim Keltner and David Foster, who met while backing George Harrison on his album Extra Texture (Read All About It). It was released on Attitudes' self-titled debut album in 1976. It was also released as a promotional single on Harrison's Dark Horse Records label.

The lyrics of "Honey Don't Leave L.A." are a plea to an "errant paramour." Following a live solo performance in 2013, Kortchmar noted that he "was trying to be sensitive. We were all trying to be sensitive back then."

"Honey Don't Leave L.A." was later covered by James Taylor, for whom it became a minor hit. Taylor included his version of "Honey Don't Leave L.A." on his 1977 album JT. David Sanborn played saxophone on the track. It was also released as the third single from the album, following "Handy Man" and "Your Smiling Face," which both reached the Top 20 of the Billboard Hot 100. Released more than six months after "Your Smiling Face" in February 1978, the "Honey Don't Leave L.A." single peaked at number 61 in the US. It also reached number 63 in Canada.

== Background ==
Kortchmar, who played guitar on Taylor's JT album, encouraged Taylor to record "Honey Don't Leave L.A." Kortchmar later told Musician that he regretted having encouraged Taylor to record "more rock 'n' roll songs like 'Honey Don't Leave L.A.'" because that was not Taylor's forte. However, Taylor enjoyed recording the song, and his recording received praise from critics. Taylor biographer Timothy White described it as "humorous" and as "one of JT's best uptempo tracks." Billboard described it as the "funkiest" of JT's three singles.

"Honey Don't Leave L.A." became a popular song in Taylor's live concerts, often with Sanborn playing saxophone. Taylor played the song as part of his set for the No Nukes concert at Madison Square Garden in September 1979, and it was included in the 1980 live album of the concert. Juan Rodriguez of The Montreal Gazette called the song one of the highlights of the album. AllMusic critic William Ruhlmann lamented the exclusion of "Honey Don't Leave L.A." from Taylor's 2000 compilation album Greatest Hits Volume 2, but the song was included on the 2013 compilation album The Essential James Taylor.

=== Critical reception ===
Billboard particularly praised Sanborn's saxophone for adding to the track's "enthusiasm" and the "playful" way Taylor sang some French phrases, comparing his approach to the way Ray Charles and Stevie Wonder incorporated French phrases into contemporary recordings. Cash Box said that it "gets funky" with "snappy guitar work, stepping beat and gritty sax solo." Rolling Stone critic Peter Herbst describes the song as "seething" and praises Taylor as "a pretty convincing rock singer" on the track. Herbst particularly praises Taylor's "rough" and "authoritative" singing on the line "They don't know nothing down in St. Tropez." Authors Don and Jeff Breithaupt described it as "chunky, soulful rock." Seattle Post-Intelligencer critic James Arellano described it as a "fun and unexpected selection" from the compilation album The Essential James Taylor.
