= JT (James Taylor album) =

Studio album by James Taylor
- Released: June 22, 1977
- Recorded: March 15 – April 24, 1977
- Studio: Sound Factory (Hollywood)
- Genre: Soft rock
- Length: 37:57
- Label: Columbia
- Producer: Peter Asher

James Taylor chronology
Greatest Hits (1976)	JT (1977)	Flag (1979)

Singles from JT
- 1. "Handy Man" Released: May 1977; 2. "Your Smiling Face" Released: September 1977; 3. "Honey Don't Leave L.A." Released: February 1978

JT is the eighth studio album by American singer-songwriter James Taylor. It was released on June 22, 1977, via Columbia Records, making it his first album released for the label. Recording session took place from March 15 to April 24, 1977, at The Sound Factory in Los Angeles with Val Garay. Production was handled by Peter Asher.

The album peaked at number 4 on the Billboard 200 albums chart in the United States and was Taylor's highest-charting album since Mud Slide Slim and the Blue Horizon. By January 31, 1997, it was certified 3 times Platinum by the Recording Industry Association of America. At the 20th Annual Grammy Awards, it was also nominated for Grammy Award for Album of the Year, but lost to Rumours by Fleetwood Mac. In The Village Voice's annual Pazz & Jop critics poll for the year's best albums, JT finished at No. 23. It would be the first and only time James Taylor would place an album in the poll's top 30 during its entire existence.

The album spawned three singles: "Handy Man" (Taylor's final top 10 hit), "Your Smiling Face" and "Honey Don't Leave L.A." "Handy Man", a Jimmy Jones cover, peaked at #4 on the Billboard Hot 100 and topped the Adult Contemporary and won the Grammy Award for Best Male Pop Vocal Performance. "Your Smiling Face", the other big hit, peaked at #20 on the Billboard Hot 100 and #6 on the Adult Contemporary chart. The record also contains other Taylor classics such as "Secret O' Life" and "Terra Nova", with the participation of Taylor's then-wife Carly Simon.

== Critical reception ==
Professional ratings
Review scores
Source	Rating
AllMusic	4/5 stars
Christgau's Record Guide	B
The Encyclopedia of Popular Music	4/5 stars
MusicHound Rock	3.5/5 stars
The Rolling Stone Album Guide	3.5/5 stars

Robert Christgau, who had been skeptical of Taylor's previous work, expressed surprise when the album exceeded his expectations, writing that "James sounds both awake and in touch...'Handy Man' is a transcendent sex ballad, while 'I Was Only Telling a Lie' and 'Secret 'o Life' evoke comparisons with betters on the order of the Stones and Randy Newman, so that the wimpy stuff — which still predominates — sounds merely laid-back in contrast. Best since Sweet Baby James...some of this is so wry and lively and committed his real fans may find it obtrusive."

Peter Herbst in Rolling Stone wrote that "JT is the least stiff and by far the most various album Taylor has done. That's not meant to criticize Taylor's earlier efforts...but it's nice to hear him sounding so healthy." Record World said that the album showcased Taylor's "soft-spoken and understated style".

John Rockwell in The New York Times complimented JT as "one of [Taylor's] stronger efforts in recent years" writing that Taylor "is at his most overtly effective on the single, 'Handy Man.' This old Otis Blackwell song was probably not designed for Mr. Taylor's sexily intimate way of singing it, but the decision to do it that way was an inspired one, and the arrangement is really quite wonderful. Nothing else on the record seems quite so good, but the level is pleasingly high." Rockwell also argues that Taylor "has never quite recaptured the inspiration of his early Sweet Baby James album, and JT doesn't do it, either. Perhaps the most obvious way that the new songs don't equal the old is their relative lack of memorable melody. Mr. Taylor's songs sound more like conversational recitations than tunes. They're still interesting, though, and some of the accompaniments are really delightful."

== Track listing ==
All songs written by James Taylor, except where noted.

Side one
No.	Title	Writer(s)	Length
1.	"Your Smiling Face"		2:50
2.	"There We Are"		3:02
3.	"Honey Don't Leave L.A."	Danny Kortchmar	3:05
4.	"Another Grey Morning"		2:44
5.	"Bartender's Blues"		4:12
6.	"Secret O' Life"		3:34

Side two
No.	Title	Writer(s)	Length
1.	"Handy Man"	Otis Blackwell; Jimmy Jones	3:17
2.	"I Was Only Telling a Lie"		3:24
3.	"Looking for Love on Broadway"		2:23
4.	"Terra Nova"	Taylor; Carly Simon	4:32
5.	"Traffic Jam"		1:58
6.	"If I Keep My Heart Out of Sight"		3:01
Total length:			37:57

== Personnel ==
- James Taylor – lead and backing vocals, acoustic guitar
- Clarence McDonald – keyboards
- Danny Kortchmar – guitar
- Dan Dugmore – steel guitar (tracks: 2, 5)
- Leland Sklar – bass guitar
- Russ Kunkel – drums, castanets (track 7), wood block (track 9), tambourine and handclaps (track 10)
- Peter Asher – cowbell (track 3), castanets (track 7), cabasa (tracks: 7, 9), wood block (track 9), tambourine and handclaps (track 10)
- David Sanborn – saxophone (track 3)
- Red Callender – tuba (track 10)
- David Campbell – string arrangements and conductor (tracks: 1, 5), viola (track 2)
- Linda Ronstadt – harmony vocals (track 5)
- Leah Kunkel – backing vocals (track 7)
- Carly Simon – harmony vocals (track 10)

=== Production ===
- Peter Asher – producer
- Val Garay – recording, mixing
- Doug Sax – mastering at The Mastering Lab (Hollywood, California)
- John Kosh – art direction, design
- David Alexander – front cover, sleeve photos
- Jim Shea – back cover, inside photos

== Charts ==
=== Weekly charts ===
Chart (1977)	Peak position
Australia (Kent Music Report)	10
Canada Top Albums/CDs (RPM)	2
New Zealand Albums (RMNZ)	31
US Billboard 200	4

=== Year-end charts ===
Chart (1977)	Position
Canada Top Albums/CDs (RPM)	20
US Billboard 200	86

== Certifications ==
Region	Certification	Certified units/sales
United States (RIAA)	3× Platinum	3,000,000^{^}
^{^} Shipments figures based on certification alone.
