= Knocking 'Round the Zoo =

Single by James Taylor

from the album James Taylor
- B-side: "Something's Wrong"
- Released: 1969
- Recorded: 1968
- Genre: Folk rock
- Length: 3:26
- Label: Apple (APF 506)
- Songwriter: James Taylor
- Producer: Peter Asher

James Taylor singles chronology
"Carolina in My Mind" (1969)	"Knocking 'Round the Zoo" (1969)	"Sweet Baby James" (1970)

"Knocking 'Round the Zoo" is a song written by James Taylor that was originally released on his 1968 debut album on Apple Records. He had previously recorded the song in 1966 with his band the Flying Machine, but that recording was not released until 1971 on James Taylor and the Original Flying Machine. It was also released by Apple as a single in France (APF 506), backed with "Something's Wrong." "Knocking 'Round the Zoo" and "Something in the Way She Moves" were included on the demo tape that Taylor sent producer Peter Asher that convinced him to sign Taylor to Apple.

Allmusic critic Lindsay Planer describes "Knocking 'Round the Zoo" as a "pseudo-blues." The lyrics were inspired by Taylor's stay at the psychiatric facility McLean Hospital. In the first verse of the song, Taylor sings that "There's bars on all the windows and they're countin' up the spoons." In actuality, McLean had 2000 pound security screens on the windows rather than bars, but they did use special utensils and count all the metal after each meal. The verse goes on to state that "if I'm feeling edgy there's a chick who's paid to be my slave/And she'll hit me with a needle if she thinks I'm trying to misbehave." In the second verse, Taylor further sings of his anger towards the workers at McLean. In the third verse, Taylor sings of how he felt ostracized at McLean with lines such as "Now my friends all come to see me/They point at me and stare." According to the editors of Time, "Taylor adds a chilling descant of bedlamite sounds" to this verse. Rolling Stone critic Timothy Crouse describes the song's drum beat as "sinister" and its guitar playing as "nervous," stating that this reflects the "anger and impatience" Taylor felt at McLean.

Rolling Stone Album Guide critic Mark Coleman considers "Knocking 'Round the Zoo" a "highlight" of James Taylor, describing it as "kicky" and saying that it predicted the path Taylor would take in future recordings. Time praises its "witty, riffy musical irony." Rolling Stone critic Jon Landau says that it "combines a subdued sense of humor with more naturalism." Taylor biographer Timothy White criticizes the "ponderous" prelude on string instruments that arranger Richard Hewson prepended to the song on the James Taylor album. Rolling Stone writer Jules Siegel criticized the song for sounding like "a sado-masochistic fantasy." Siegel suggested that Taylor was making himself out to be an aristocrat and still in control despite being in a mental hospital, with "a female attendant paid to be his slave." Siegel also criticizes the line about the attendant hitting him with a needle. Author Ian Halperin criticizes the compact disc release of James Taylor and the Original Flying Machine for revising the instrumentation.
