= Secret O' Life =

Song by James Taylor

from the album JT
- Released: June 1977
- Recorded: 1977
- Genre: Soft rock
- Length: 3:34
- Label: Columbia
- Songwriter: James Taylor
- Producer: Peter Asher

James Taylor singles chronology
"Everybody Has the Blues" (1976)	"Secret O' Life" (1977)	"Handy Man" (1977)

"Secret O' Life" is a song written by James Taylor that first appeared on his 1977 album JT. It has since appeared on several of his live and compilation albums. It was also included in the Broadway musical Chita Rivera: The Dancer's Life and has been covered by many other artists, including Art Garfunkel, Richie Havens, Nancy LaMott, Rosemary Clooney, Shirley Horn and Ricky Peterson.

== Lyrics and music ==
Although not released as a single, Allmusic critic William Ruhlmann considered "Secret O' Life" to be the key track on JT with its message that the secret of life is "enjoying the passage of time." Authors Don and Jeff Breithaupt deemed the theme of the song to be the importance of "living in the moment." Self-help book authors Pete Forantale and Bill Ayres regard the song as giving the listener permission to meditate, reflect and daydream. Taylor regards it as a spiritual song. He has said that he used the title "Secret O' Life" rather than "Secret of Life" because the latter seemed too presumptuous and preposterous. He felt that the "O" would make it seem a little more irreverent, evoking the names of Life Savers candy flavors such as "Pep O Mint" and "Wint O Green", and offset some of the presumptuousness of announcing the secret of life.

Taylor recalls having written the song at his home in Martha's Vineyard during the late spring with the sun shining in. He recalls that the song, or at least the first verse and the refrain, came to him quickly and he felt lucky to have been playing his guitar at the time.

Despite the positive lyrics, "vivacious" music, and the fact that Taylor claims he felt "great" while writing the song, Taylor's father, Dr. Isaac M. Taylor heard a different message when he heard the song. Dr. Taylor heard a note of apprehension in the song, and felt that James Taylor was "wondering where his career was leading" when he wrote it. Taylor biographer Mark Robowsky similarly notes that although the lyrics are generally optimistic, the optimism is undercut by the line "Nobody knows how we got to the top of the hill/But since we're on our way down, we might as well enjoy the ride."

But Taylor told an interviewer "the 'way down' that that refers to is actually entropy in the universe." This reference goes along with the other mention of physics in the song, quoting Einstein and referring obliquely to his Theory of Relativity as it pertains to time: "It's all in your point of view"—because measurements of time differ depending on the observer.

== Reception ==
Music critic Robert Christgau rates the song as evoking "comparison with betters on the order of ... Randy Newman." Taylor biographer Timothy White regards "Secret O' Life" as an indispensable song in the Taylor canon. White describes it as a "folk haiku" that is "touching" but with a "sly Scottish twinkle in the eye." Rolling Stone critic Stephen Holden described it as having "delicious ironic glee." Tom Waseleski of Beaver County Times pointed to "Secret O' Life" as a prime example of the fact that Taylor is an introspective writer and is at his best when he allows his songs to reflect that. Holly Gleason of The Palm Beach Post described the song as "understated." Fornatale and Ayres regard Taylor's vocal performance on "Secret O' Life" as being "better than ever." Robowsky describes it as a "beautiful ballad" and "an unapologetic toast to simple truths." Taylor regarded it as one of the few songs he wrote in the late 1970s that was as good as the songs on his first album.

"Secret O' Life" has been a staple of Taylor's live concerts at times, and has been included on the live albums Live and One Man Band. It has also been included on the compilation albums Greatest Hits Volume 2 and The Essential James Taylor. A version Taylor performed on Saturday Night Live was included on the multi-artist compilation album Saturday Night Live: 25 Years, Vol. 1.

== Cover versions ==
Nancy LaMott included a version of the song on her 1995 album Listen to My Heart and her 2005 album Live from the Tavern Green.

Art Garfunkel included the song on his 1997 album Songs from a Parent to a Child. Secret O' Life was also featured in the 3rd Rock from the Sun pilot "Brains and Eggs".

Singer Rosemary Clooney recorded the song for her 1998 album 70: A Seventieth Birthday Celebration, and regarded it as one of her favorites. In a review of her 1999 compilation Songs from the Girl Singer: A Musical Autobiography, one critic described "Secret of Life" as an "affectionately sung capsule of philosophy."

Shirley Horn recorded a jazz version for the 2001 album Sketches of James. JazzTimes critic Kilarie S. Grey described her version as "world-weary" and "striking."

Scott Grimes, in the role of Lieutenant Gordon Malloy on the television series The Orville: New Horizons, performed the song in the "Future Unknown" episode first aired August 4, 2022.

Chita Rivera performed the song as part of her 2005 Broadway musical review The Dancer's Life.

Gloria Lynne included the song on her 2007 album From My Heart to Yours.

Taylor recorded the song as a duet with Barbra Streisand for her 2025 album The Secret of Life.
