= Good Timin' (Jimmy Jones song) =

Single by Jimmy Jones
- B-side: "My Precious Angel"
- Released: April 1960
- Genre: R&B
- Length: 2:10
- Label: Cub Records K9067
- Songwriter(s): Fred Tobias, Clint Ballard, Jr.
- Producer(s): Otis Blackwell

Jimmy Jones singles chronology
"Handy Man" (1959)	"Good Timin'" (1960)	"That's When I Cried" (1960)

"Good Timin'" was a number-one single in the UK Singles Chart during 1960, written by Fred Tobias and Clint Ballard Jr., and performed by Jimmy Jones. In the U.S., the follow-up to "Handy Man" went to number three on Billboard Hot 100 chart and number eight on the R&B chart. The song extrapolates the historical encounters between David and Goliath and between Columbus and Isabella as reason enough for a boy to meet a girl.

== Charts ==
=== Weekly charts ===
Chart (1960)	Peak position
Australia (Kent Music Report)	7
Canada (CHUM Hit Parade)	6
New Zealand (Lever Hit Parade)	5
UK Singles Chart	1
U.S. Billboard Hot 100	3
U.S. Billboard R&B Singles	8
U.S. Cash Box Top 100	3

=== Year-end charts ===
Chart (1960)	Rank
UK	7
U.S. Billboard Hot 100	31
U.S. Cash Box	23

== Cover versions ==
"Good Timin'" was later covered by Kyu Sakamoto in Japanese.

Australian band Ol' 55 covered the song on their album The Vault (1980).

UK band Showaddywaddy also covered the song and released it as a single in 1981, but it failed to reach the charts. It was also featured on their 1981 album Good Times.
