= Carolina in My Mind =

Single by James Taylor

from the album James Taylor
- B-side: "Taking It In" (1969 original) "Something's Wrong" (1970 reissue)
- Released: February 1969
- Recorded: July–October 1968
- Studio: Trident Studios (London, England)
- Genre: Folk rock, country pop
- Length: 3:36 (original); 3:57 (1976 version)
- Label: Apple
- Songwriter: James Taylor
- Producer: Peter Asher

James Taylor singles chronology
"Carolina in My Mind" (1969)	"Knocking 'Round the Zoo" (1969)

"Carolina in My Mind" is a song originally written and performed by the American singer-songwriter James Taylor. It was Taylor's second single from his 1968 self-titled debut album. Taylor wrote Carolina in My Mind while in England recording for the Beatles' label Apple Records, and the song's themes reflect his homesickness at the time. Released as a single in 1969, the song earned critical praise but not commercial success. It was re-recorded for Taylor's 1976 Greatest Hits album in the version that is most familiar to listeners. It has been a staple of Taylor's concert performances over the decades of his career. Carolina in My Mind is one of the most covered contemporary folk songs of all time, the most famous of which being covers by American singer-songwriter John Denver and American rock music duo the Everly Brothers.

The song was a modest hit on the country charts in 1969 for North Carolinian singer George Hamilton IV, released as the first single from his 1970 album Back Where It's At (see George Hamilton IV discography). Strongly tied to a sense of geographic place, "Carolina in My Mind" has been called an unofficial state anthem for North Carolina. It is also an unofficial song of the University of North Carolina at Chapel Hill, being played at athletic events and pep rallies and sung by the graduating class at every university commencement. The association of the song with the state is also made in written works of both fiction and non-fiction. It has become one of Taylor's most critically praised songs and one that has great popularity and significance for his audience.

== Song and recordings ==
The song references Taylor's years growing up in North Carolina. Taylor wrote it while overseas recording for the Beatles' label Apple Records. He started writing the song at producer Peter Asher's London flat on Marylebone High Street, resumed work on it while on holiday on the Mediterranean island of Formentera, and then completed it while stranded on the nearby island of Ibiza with Karin, a Swedish girl he had just met. The song reflects Taylor's homesickness at the time, as he was missing his family, his dog and his state.

Dark and silent late last night,
I think I might have heard the highway calling ...
Geese in flight and dogs that bite
And signs that might be omens say I'm going, I'm going
I'm gone to Carolina in my mind.

The original recording of the song was done at London's Trident Studios during the July to October 1968 period, and was produced by Asher. The song's lyric "holy host of others standing around me" makes reference to the Beatles, who were recording The Beatles in the same studio where Taylor was recording his album. Indeed, the recording of "Carolina in My Mind" includes a credited appearance by Paul McCartney on bass guitar and an uncredited one by George Harrison on backing vocals. The other players were Freddie Redd on organ, Joel "Bishop" O'Brien on drums, and Mick Wayne providing a second guitar alongside Taylor's. Taylor and Asher also did backing vocals and Asher added a tambourine. Richard Hewson arranged and conducted a string part; an even more ambitious 30-piece orchestra part was recorded but not used. The song itself earned critical praise, with Jon Landau's April 1969 review for Rolling Stone calling it "beautiful" and one of the "two most deeply affecting cuts" on the album and praising McCartney's bass playing as "extraordinary". Taylor biographer Timothy White calls the song "the album's quiet masterpiece". In a 50-years-later retrospective of the album's release, Billboard calls the song "a mellow Taylor classic" and a "stone-classic".

The song was first released on Taylor's eponymous debut album in December 1968 (February 1969 in the United States), and was later released as a single in the UK in February 1969 and in the United States in March 1969. However, owing to the same problems which plagued the release of the album (namely, Taylor's inability to promote it due to his hospitalization for drug addiction), the single's original release reached only No. 118 on US pop charts and failed to chart in the UK. Indeed, Taylor had fallen back into addiction during the London recording sessions, and his line about being surrounded by Beatles had been immediately followed by "Still I'm on the dark side of the moon". Following the success of Taylor's second album, Sweet Baby James, and its hit single "Fire and Rain", "Carolina in My Mind" was reissued by Apple as a single in October 1970 and rose to No. 67 on the U.S. charts. (A previously unreleased acoustic demo of "Carolina in My Mind" was issued as a bonus track on the 2010 Apple Records remastering of James Taylor.) In Canada, the song peaked at No. 64 in the spring of 1969.

Different versions of both this song and "Something in the Way She Moves" were remade by Taylor for use on his 1976 Greatest Hits album because of the difficulty of obtaining licensing rights from Apple during the 1970s and because of uncertainty about where the Apple masters were. The new recordings were done in October 1976 at The Sound Factory in Los Angeles and production was again done by Peter Asher.

This rendition of "Carolina in My Mind" had a slower tempo than the original, and accompanying Taylor on acoustic guitar were experienced LA session musicians Dan Dugmore on pedal steel guitar (highlighted in the descending note sequences at the song's conclusion), Leland Sklar on bass, Russ Kunkel on drums, Clarence McDonald on piano, Andrew Gold on harmonium, and Byron Berline on fiddle. Backing vocals were handled by Gold and Taylor. Greatest Hits became a diamond record, selling more than 11 million copies in the United States by 2001, and this is the version of "Carolina in My Mind" that became best known. The remake earned even more critical praise than the original. Bill Janovitz of Allmusic said of the 1976 recording that it "accent[ed] the languid, plaintive and wistful country melancholy of the song", while in the 1979 Rolling Stone Record Guide, critic Stephen Holden said that the "stunning" remake showed how much Taylor's singing had strengthened in the intervening years. Biographer White believed that the song benefited from the removal of the original's orchestration.

The 1976 re-recording was also included on Taylor's 2003 compilation The Best of James Taylor.

== Personnel ==
- James Taylor – vocals, acoustic guitar
- Dan Dugmore – pedal steel guitar
- Leland Sklar – bass guitar
- Russ Kunkel – drums
- Clarence McDonald – piano
- Andrew Gold – pump organ, backing vocals
- Byron Berline – fiddle

== Chart history ==
James Taylor:

Chart (1969)	Peak position
Canada RPM Top Singles	64
US Billboard Hot 100	118

Chart (1970)	Peak position
US Billboard Hot 100	67
US Cash Box Top 100	72

George Hamilton IV:

Chart (1969–70)	Peak position
Canada RPM Adult Contemporary	39
Canada RPM Country Tracks	3
US Hot Country Songs (Billboard)	29

Crystal Mansion:

Chart (1970)	Peak position
Canada RPM Top Singles	37
US Billboard Adult Contemporary	34
US Billboard Hot 100	73
US Cash Box Top 100	61

== Later appearances ==
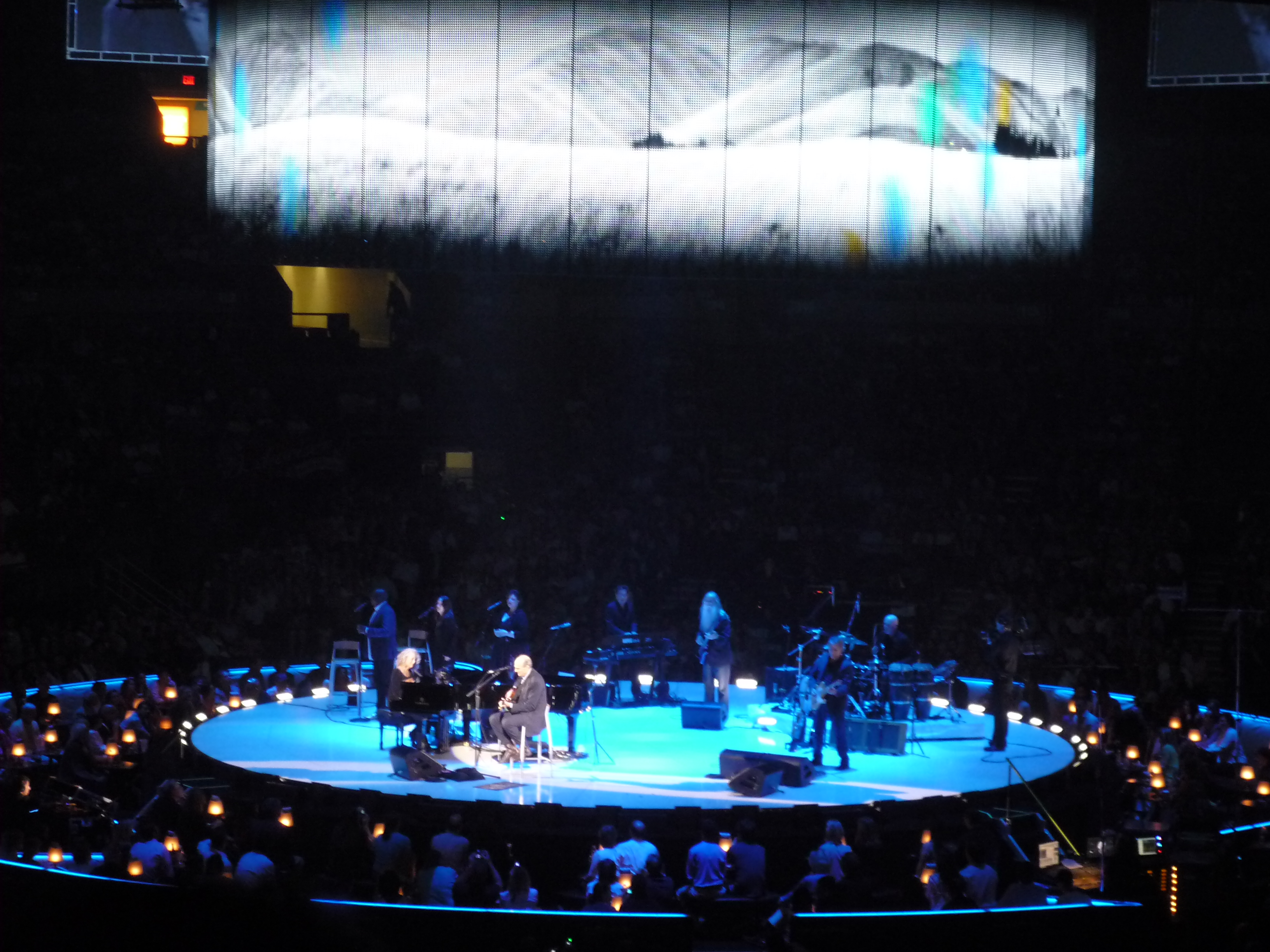
Taylor performs "Carolina in My Mind" during his 2010 Troubadour Reunion Tour with Carole King. The video screen shows scenes of a countryside.

"Carolina in My Mind" became a staple of Taylor's concert repertoire, appearing in the set list of virtually every Taylor tour. A 1992 performance of it was included near the end of Taylor's first live album, 1993's Live. The audience reaction demonstrates that the song has great popularity despite never being a hit single: there is immediate cheering as the first notes are picked out on Taylor's acoustic guitar, and further cheering as soon as he starts to sing. By this era Taylor's always-excellent touring band was using four backing singers. Arnold McCuller, David Lasley, Kate Markowitz, and Valerie Carter featured strongly in the arrangement, continuing the emphasis on the song's harmonies that had begun with the 1976 remake.

The song has been included in a number of Taylor's concert video releases, including 1980's James Taylor: In Concert at the Blossom Music Center, 1988's James Taylor: In Concert at Boston's Colonial Theatre, and 2002's Pull Over. It was performed in collaboration with the Dixie Chicks in 2002 for the CMT Crossroads program. In 2004, Taylor and the Chicks again performed the song together during the Vote for Change tour, with Taylor dedicating it to former North Carolina Senator and U.S. vice-presidential candidate John Edwards. On the 2006 A Musicares Person of the Year Tribute Honoring James Taylor tribute show and video release, "Carolina in My Mind" was performed by Alison Krauss and Jerry Douglas. The song was then included in Taylor's 2006–2007 One Man Band Tour; accompanied only by Larry Goldings on piano and harmonium, Taylor introduced the song with visual material and by relating its composition on Formentera and other locations. He talked about the Karin of the lyrics, whom he had known only briefly and never seen since, and related various humorous notions about how to find her again. One such performance was documented on the 2007 album and video release One Man Band. Another live performance appeared on Taylor's 2010 live CD/DVD combo release with Carole King, Live at The Troubadour. James Taylor appeared on The Colbert Report on January 19, 2012, and sang "Carolina in My Mind" along with Stephen Colbert, and then performed it on the final day of the 2012 Democratic National Convention in Charlotte, North Carolina, where he greeted "fellow Tar Heels and Democrats".

In a 2020 interview with Parade, Taylor stated that "Carolina in My Mind" was his favorite song to perform, explaining, "Because my audience responds well to it, and because it wears well, I like 'Carolina In My Mind'. I play it almost every time I perform, and I haven't tired of it."

== Other versions ==
While "Carolina in My Mind" did not gain much attention from the public upon its original release, it did from other artists. It was a No. 29 hit on the American country charts and No. 3 hit in Canada in 1969 for North Carolinian singer George Hamilton IV. The Everly Brothers also released it as a single in 1969, under the variant title "Carolina on My Mind", but it failed to chart; this was later collected on their 1994 box set Heartaches and Harmonies. Evie Sands also touched upon it in her 1969 album Any Way That You Want Me.

The song was recorded by Melanie on her hit April 1970 album Candles in the Rain; the arrangement and vocal phrasing are different from Taylor's, and Allmusic writes that her version "exist[s] on an entirely separate plane from the original". It was also recorded in more conventional folk rock form by John Denver on his May 1970 album Take Me to Tomorrow. Philadelphia-based pop group Crystal Mansion released a version in October 1970 that reached No. 73 on the U.S. pop singles chart. Dawn included a version of it on their 1970 debut album Candida. About the same time, Glen Campbell was performing the song as a sped-up country duet with Linda Ronstadt on his popular television series The Glen Campbell Goodtime Hour; this was later collected on his 2007 video release Good Times Again.

The song subsequently became so identified with Taylor that other artists recorded it less frequently, but still by the late 2000s there were some 60 albums (including compilation reappearances and albums from Taylor himself) that featured it.

In 2026, American rapper J. Cole sampled the song as the opening track for his album The Fall-Off.

== Sense of place ==
In 1998, a family of James Taylor fans listens to the Live recording of "Carolina in My Mind" as they enter the state on North Carolina Highway 168.

"Carolina in My Mind" is strongly associated with its geographical place and has been referred to a number of times as an unofficial state anthem of North Carolina. Taylor had grown up in Carrboro, outside Chapel Hill, where his father taught at the University of North Carolina School of Medicine. Taylor later reflected: "Chapel Hill, the piedmont, the outlying hills, were tranquil, rural, beautiful, but quiet. Thinking of the red soil, the seasons, the way things smelled down there, I feel as though my experience of coming of age there was more a matter of landscape and climate than people." More broadly, the song has been associated with The South. Author James L. Peacock sees it akin to Stephen Foster's "My Old Kentucky Home" and other songs and works of literature in establishing "the South's sense of place", even if that sense is sometimes an exercise in projected nostalgia. Author Ken Emerson also sees a connection to that quintessential American songwriter, with the Taylor song resembling Foster's "Sitting By My Own Cabin Door" in its sense of longing for home amid personal and contextual dislocation. Recognizing the association with the state, the Chapel Hill Museum opened an ongoing exhibit "Carolina in My Mind: The James Taylor Story" in 2003 that includes memorabilia from Taylor's years in the area and a video documentary.

"Carolina in My Mind" is also an unofficial song of the University of North Carolina at Chapel Hill. It is played at athletic events and pep rallies, and is sung by the graduating class at every university graduation. In 2019 the student newspaper The Daily Tar Heel ran a piece detailing how the song often stayed with students beyond their years on campus. The song is also frequently performed by popular UNC campus a cappella groups, including the Clef Hangers. The Clef Hangers' Fall Concert 2007 performances of the song featured future American Idol season 8 finalist Anoop Desai handling the lead vocal on the closing part of the song. The Clef Hangers, joined by university chancellor Holden Thorp, again performed it in March 2009 at the first anniversary memorial service for murdered student president Eve Carson. In 2019, one former Clef Hanger recalled that, "Pretty quickly ... I realized that the song had a lot of significance. We also sing it at graduation every year, as a send off, so there's more significance behind it ... we treat it like our special thing we get to bring during private events or even situations like graduation."

In October 2006, Taylor returned to the campus to receive the school's Carolina Performing Arts Lifetime Achievement Award. University chancellor James Moeser said to Taylor, "We love you. We love what you do and how you represent this university." Taylor said, "It's strange but somehow compelling to come home and sing it. It draws a line through my own personal history and connects me again to a place that I go to in my dreams, a landscape that will forever be a part of me."

"Carolina in My Mind" is the corps song for the Carolina Crown Drum & Bugle Corps; the corps sings the song before every performance. The 82nd Airborne Division of the United States Army, stationed at Fort Bragg in North Carolina, sponsors a group of singing soldiers known as the 82nd Airborne Division All-American Chorus. They recorded a version of the song on their 2009 album A Soldier's Heart, and the song is part of their concert repertoire.

Some of the song's lyrics are used as an epigraph in the 2001 Celebrate the States series volume on North Carolina and in the 1983 reference book America the Quotable. News providers have used "Carolina in My Mind" as a title for stories about the state's politics, economy, and outdoor activities. The song's geographical association also appears in fiction, including in Carly Alexander's 2004 novel The Eggnog Chronicles and North Carolinian Sharyn McCrumb's 2006 novel St. Dale.

Although it was North Carolina that inspired the song, it is popular in South Carolina too, tying for first place on a South Carolina Information Highway's construction of a soundtrack regarding the state. It has been used as the theme for the television coverage of the annual Family Circle Cup tennis event in South Carolina.

"Carolina in My Mind" has been mentioned by members of the Carolinian diaspora. Prize-winning North Carolinian writer Jill McCorkle, living in Massachusetts, refers to it as "the chosen anthem of misplaced Carolinians". In Kathy Reichs' initial Temperance Brennan novel, Déjà Dead, the protagonist (like the author) is from North Carolina but working in Montreal as a forensic anthropologist, and alludes to the song as part of a Carolinian reverie in the midst of a horrid murder case. One person who had moved to California said, "Still to this day I get nostalgic whenever I hear it on the radio. It's a song that makes anyone who grew up in North Carolina homesick. In a way, it's become an anthem song for people who left the state."
