= Sunny Skies (song) =

Single by James Taylor

from the album Sweet Baby James
- A-side: "Country Road"
- Released: February 1971
- Genre: Folk; skiffle; jazz
- Length: 2:21
- Label: Warner Bros.
- Songwriter: James Taylor
- Producer: Peter Asher

James Taylor singles chronology
"Steamroller Blues" (1970)	"Sunny Skies" (1971)	"You've Got a Friend" (1971)

"Sunny Skies" is a song written by James Taylor that first appeared on his 1970 album Sweet Baby James. It was also released as the B-side to the "Country Road" single. It has since been covered by other artists, including Stéphane Grappelli and Jerry Douglas.

== Composition and recording ==
Taylor wrote "Sunny Skies" during his treatment at the Austen Riggs Center. The melody is cheerful, which is ironic given the lyrics. Taylor's biographer, Timothy White, describes the melody as "a deceptively upbeat, skiffle-flavored shuffle". The author Stephen Davis describes the song as "jazzy but disconsolate" and James Perrone compares the melody to John Sebastian's song "Daydream". Taylor accompanies himself on acoustic guitar.

The title "Sunny Skies" actually does not refer to the condition of the sky, but to the title character of the song, who "sleeps in the morning", "weeps in the evening", "doesn't know when to rise" and has no friends. The last verse links the title character to the singer, who sings that he looks out of his own window to see snow and trees, and wonders if he should let the world pass him by, just like the title character. The singer, like Taylor himself at the time, wonders if his accomplishments were worth the suffering he went through to achieve them. Perrone also notes that, like the title character, Taylor had gone through a period where he was too depressed to get up in the morning.

"Sunny Skies" was included on the 1990 version of the compilation album The Best of James Taylor. Taylor wrote the song before being released from his original Apple Records contract, and a demo version of "Sunny Skies" was included as a bonus track of the 2010 CD version of Taylor's first album James Taylor. Taylor played the song on 15 May 1980 for the 100th episode of Saturday Night Live.

== Cover versions ==
- Stéphane Grappelli recorded "Sunny Skies" in the early 1970s for Pye Records. It was re-released along with other Grapelli recordings of the period on the 2002 album The Collection. Grapelli's biographer Geoffrey Smith considers this "country-style" version works well because of "Grappelli's dark, tender sostenuto" and the "idiomatic, slightly twangy accompaniment".
- Jerry Douglas covered "Sunny Skies" on his 1982 album Fluxedo.
- Stevie Holland covered it on her 2004 album Restless Willow.
