= Something in the Way She Moves =

1968 song by American singer-songwriter James Taylor

Song by James Taylor

from the album James Taylor
- Released: December 6, 1968
- Recorded: Trident, London
- Genre: Folk rock
- Length: 2:54
- Label: Apple Records
- Songwriter: James Taylor
- Producer: Peter Asher

"Something in the Way She Moves" is a song written by James Taylor that appeared on his 1968 eponymous debut album for Apple Records. The first version released was in April 1968 by Tom Rush on his album The Circle Game, before Taylor's later that year. The song has also been covered by other artists, including Bobbie Gentry and Harry Belafonte. The opening line inspired George Harrison to write the No. 1 Beatles' song "Something". According to James Taylor's stage banter at The Star in Frisco on 31 July 2017, this was the song he played for Paul McCartney and George Harrison as an audition before signing with Apple Records.

== James Taylor version ==
"Something in the Way She Moves" is a romantic song. Rolling Stone critic Jon Landau regards the song as being about "transcendence of a sort." Taylor plays the song accompanied only by acoustic guitar.

AllMusic critic Lindsay Planer regards "Something in the Way She Moves" as one of the "notable inclusions" on the James Taylor album. Fellow AllMusic critic David R. Adler described it as "one of Taylor's finest melodies". Rolling Stone Album Guide critic Mark Coleman agrees that it is a "highlight" of James Taylor, describing the song as "winsome" and predicting the path Taylor would take in future recordings. Taylor biographer Timothy White describes it as being "unquestionably Taylor's finest performance" on James Taylor. White described it as "spare in presentation" and "poignant on its own elegant terms." Rolling Stone critic Jon Landau believes that the spare performance and Taylor's "restrained delivery" add to the song's power, as Taylor "lets the melody, lyric, guitar, and voice speak for themselves." Martin Charles Strong describes it as being a "memorable original" and one that "marked Taylor out as a kind of male Joni Mitchell, if not quite as adventurous."

Taylor included "Something in the Way She Moves" on his 1976 Greatest Hits but, as with "Carolina in My Mind", also from James Taylor, he had to re-record the song due to rights issues. It was also included on the 2003 compilation album The Best of James Taylor (although original pressings of that album contained a shortened version without harpsichord of the original Apple Records version). A live version was included on Taylor's and Carole King's live album Live at the Troubadour. A solo live version leads off Taylor's album One Man Band.

== Inspiration for "Something" ==
George Harrison liked "Something in the Way She Moves" so much that he used the beginning as the first line of his 1969 song "Something" from the Beatles album Abbey Road, which was released as a single and reached No. 1. Early in the development of "Something", Harrison had expanded the opening of this song to "Something in the way she moves / Attracts me like a pomegranate," using the word "pomegranate" simply as a place-holder until better words could be found.

Taylor has stated that "I never thought for a second that George intended to do that. I don't think he intentionally ripped anything off, and all music is borrowed from other music. So completely I let it pass." Taylor also acknowledged that the ending of "Something in the Way She Moves" was taken from the Beatles' song "I Feel Fine" and so "what goes around comes around."

== Tom Rush version ==
"Something in the Way She Moves"

Single by Tom Rush

from the album The Circle Game
- B-side: "Rockport Sunday"
- Released: 1968
- Genre: Folk rock
- Length: 3:25
- Label: Elektra
- Songwriter: James Taylor
- Producer: Arthur Gorson

Tom Rush recorded "Something in the Way She Moves" on his 1968 album The Circle Game. Taylor had played the song for Rush when he visited the Elektra Records offices for an audition in 1967. Rush's version was released first, before Taylor's later in 1968. It was released as a single and become popular on New England radio stations. Crawdaddy! reviewed the song as being the best song on The Circle Game, saying that it "flows beautifully with Bruce Langhorne's country stylings pushing it through," also acknowledging that "Rush's brand of vocalizing fits perfectly" because "he can never get excited about anything."

== Other versions ==
Country artist Bobbie Gentry recorded a version titled "Something in the Way He Moves" for her 1970 album Fancy.

Iain Matthews and his band Matthews' Southern Comfort recorded a version of "Something in the Way She Moves" for his 1970 album Second Spring.

Harry Belafonte covered the song as the opening track of his 1971 album The Warm Touch. He also released it as a single. Billboard regarded "Something in the Way She Moves" as one of the "standout" tracks on The Warm Touch. Billboard also called the melody "beautiful" and stated that Belafonte gave the song "his own unique treatment."

Mitchel Forman recorded an acoustic piano version of "Something in the Way She Moves" for the 2001 multi-artist album Sketches of James: Selection from the James Taylor Songbook.
