= Country Road (song) =

- German 7" picture sleeve

Single by James Taylor

from the album Sweet Baby James
- B-side: "Sunny Skies"
- Released: February 1971
- Genre: Folk rock, country rock
- Length: 3:24
- Label: Warner Bros.
- Songwriter: James Taylor
- Producer: Peter Asher

James Taylor singles chronology
"Fire and Rain" (1970)	"Country Road" (1971)	"Steamroller Blues" (1970)

"Country Road" is a song written and performed by American singer-songwriter James Taylor, released in February 1971 by Warner Bros. Records. It is the third single from Taylor's second studio album, Sweet Baby James. "Country Road" is also featured on James Taylor's 1976 Greatest Hits record. The song has been played at most of his concerts since 1970. Randy Meisner, later of the Eagles, played bass on the album version.

== Background ==
The song was inspired by Somerset Street in Belmont, Massachusetts, a wooded road running adjacent to the land owned by McLean Hospital where Taylor had committed himself in 1965 to receive treatment for depression. Taylor's friend Danny Kortchmar said Taylor wrote "Country Road" in Martha's Vineyard, saying:

"The island was a magic place. When it was dark, it was absolutely black, and when it was quiet, there wasn't a sound. I think it was a profound experience for James and me, too — a romantic trip. I think that's where his song 'Country Road' came from."

Music lecturer James Perrone says the theme of "Country Road" is the happiness and freedom of being alone. He noted the theme of solitude appears on other songs on Sweet Baby James including the title track and "Sunny Skies." "Sunny Skies was also released as the b-side of the "Country Road" single. According to AllMusic critic Ronnie D. Lankford, Jr., "Country Road" "perfectly marked the transition between the '60s and the '70s." "This is because the lyrics suggest that it's time for those tired of trying to solve all the world's problems to leave them to Jesus and go away on their own". Lankford said the song's "simple arrangement," with acoustic guitar and "laid back" vocals are well matched to the lyrics. Music author Barney Hoskyns called "Country Road" "a perfect distillation of the new rural mood" which had become popular at the time.

== Critical reception ==
Upon its single release, Record World called it a "logical choice for his next hit single. Added interest will be generated in that it's a bit different from the album cut." Cash Box called it a "gem" and said "Somewhat akin to his 'Fire & Rain' sound, the new release should have little problem streaking into top forty running." Billboard called it a "strong rhythm item" with an "exceptional performance."

== Chart history ==
The re-recorded Country Road single version was recorded and mixed at Crystal-Sound, December 30, 1970, and released on 7" vinyl in February 1971. In 2003, the single version was included on CD for the first time on the compilation album "You’ve Got A Friend: The Best Of James Taylor”. "Country Road" reached number 37 on the Billboard pop singles chart and number 9 Easy Listening in early 1971. On the Canadian charts, the song was a bigger hit on both the Pop (#19) and Adult Contemporary (#3) charts.

Chart (1971)	Peak position
Canada RPM Top Singles	19
Canada RPM Adult Contemporary	3
U.S. Billboard Hot 100	37
U.S. Billboard Adult Contemporary	9
U.S. Cash Box Top 100	25
