= George Hamilton IV discography =

This is the discography for American country musician George Hamilton IV.

== Albums ==
Year	Album	Chart positions		Label
Year	Album	U.S. Country	U.S.	Label
1958	On Campus	—	—	ABC-Paramount
1958	Sing Me a Sad Song	—	—	ABC-Paramount
1961	To You and Yours	—	—	RCA Victor
1963	Abilene	18	77	RCA Victor
1964	Fort Worth, Dallas or Houston	—	—	RCA Victor
1965	Mister Sincerity...A Tribute to Ernest Tubb	19	—	RCA Victor
1966	Coast-Country	21	—	RCA Victor
1966	Steel Rail Blues	3	—	RCA Victor
1967	Folk Country Classics	3	—	RCA Victor
1967	Folksy	21	—	RCA Victor
1968	The Gentle Country Sound of George Hamilton IV	25	—	RCA Victor
1968	In the 4th Dimension	36	—	RCA Victor
1969	Canadian Pacific	—	—	RCA Victor
1970	The Best Of	—	—	RCA Victor
1970	Back Where It's At	—	—	RCA Victor
1971	North Country	45	—	RCA Victor
1971	West Texas Highway	—	—	RCA Victor
1972	Country Music in My Soul	—	—	RCA Victor
1972	Travelin' Light	—	—	RCA Victor
1972	International Ambassador	—	—	RCA Victor
1973	Out West Country	—	—	RCA Victor
1974	The Best Of Volume 2 (UK only)	—	—	RCA Victor
1974	"Greatest Hits"	35	—	RCA Victor
1975	Trendsetter	—	—	RCA Victor
1975	Back to Down East Country	—	—	RCA Victor
1976	Back Home at the Opry	—	—	RCA Victor
1977	Fine Lace and Homespun Cloth	—	—	Anchor
1978	Feels Like a Million	—	—	Anchor
1979	Forever Young	—	—	MCA
1982	Songs for a Winter's Night	—	—	Ronco
1983	Country Beat	—	—	Supraphon
1984	Music Man's Dream	—	—	Range
1985	George Hamilton IV	—	—	MCA
1986	American Country Gothic with the Moody Brothers	—	—	Lamon Records
1990	HomeGrown with George Hamilton V	—	—	Lamon Records
2004	Blue Ridge Sunday	—	—	Lamon Records
2006	Heritage and Legacy	—	—	Lamon Records
2010	Old Fashioned Hymns and Gospel Songs for Those Who Miss Them	—	—	Lamon Records (US) and Hillcrest Recordings (Ireland)
2011	In the Heart of Texas	—	—	Heart of Texas Records
2012	Luke the Drifter (The Other Side of Hank Williams)	—	—	Lamon Records

== Singles ==
Year	Single	Chart positions				Album
Year	Single	U.S. Country	U.S.	CAN Country	CAN AC	Album
1956	"A Rose and a Baby Ruth"	—	6	—	—	singles only
1957	"High School Romance"	—	80	—	—	singles only
1957	"Only One Love"	—	33	—	—	singles only
1957	"Why Don't They Understand"	—	10	—	—	singles only
1958	"I Know Where I'm Goin'"	—	43	—	—	singles only
1958	"Now and for Always"^{A}	—	25	—	—	singles only
1958	"The Teen Commandments" (with Paul Anka and Johnny Nash)^{B}	—	29	—	—	singles only
1958	"When Will I Know"	—	65	—	—	singles only
1958	"Your Cheatin' Heart"	—	72	—	—	Sing Me a Sad Song
1959	"Steady Game"	—	—	—	—	singles only
1959	"Gee"	—	73	—	—	singles only
1959	"Little Tom"	—	—	—	—	singles only
1960	"Why I'm Walkin'"	—	—	—	—	singles only
1960	"Before This Day Ends"	4	—	—	—	singles only
1960	"Walk On the Wild Side of Life"	—	—	—	—	singles only
1961	"Three Steps to the Phone (Millions of Miles)"	9	—	—	—	To You and Yours
1961	"To You and Yours (From Me and Mine)"	13	—	—	—	To You and Yours
1962	"China Doll"	22	—	—	—	Abilene
1962	"If You Don't Know I Ain't Gonna Tell You"	6	—	—	—	Abilene
1963	"In This Very Same Room"	21	—	—	—	single only
1963	"Abilene"^{C}	1	15	—	—	Abilene
1964	"There's More Pretty Girls Than One"	21	116	—	—	Fort Worth, Dallas or Houston
1964	"Linda with the Lonely Eyes"	25	—	—	—	Fort Worth, Dallas or Houston
1964	"Fair and Tender Ladies"	28	—	—	—	Fort Worth, Dallas or Houston
1964	"Fort Worth, Dallas or Houston"	9	—	3	—	Fort Worth, Dallas or Houston
1965	"Truck Drivin' Man"	11	—	—	—	Fort Worth, Dallas or Houston
1965	"Walking the Floor Over You"	18	—	—	—	Mister Sincerity...A Tribute to Ernest Tubb
1966	"Write Me a Picture"	16	—	—	—	Steel Rail Blues
1966	"Steel Rail Blues"	15	—	—	—	Steel Rail Blues
1966	"Early Morning Rain"	9	—	—	—	Steel Rail Blues
1967	"Urge for Going"	7	—	—	—	Folksy
1967	"Break My Mind"	6	—	—	—	Folksy
1968	"Little World Girl"	18	—	2	—	The Gentle Country Sound of George Hamilton IV
1968	"It's My Time"	50	—	—	—	The Gentle Country Sound of George Hamilton IV
1968	"Take My Hand for Awhile"	38	—	14	—	In the 4th Dimension
1969	"Back to Denver"	26	—	4	—	In the 4th Dimension
1969	"Canadian Pacific"^{D}	25	—	1	4	Canadian Pacific
1969	"Carolina in My Mind"	29	—	3	39	Back Where It's At
1970	"She's a Little Bit Country"	3	—	1	—	Back Where It's At
1970	"Back Where It's At"	16	—	1	—	Back Where It's At
1971	"Anyway"	13	—	1	—	Back Where It's At
1971	"Countryfied"	35	—	1	—	North Country
1971	"West Texas Highway"	23	—	—	—	West Texas Highway
1972	"10 Degrees & Getting Colder"	33	—	3	—	West Texas Highway
1972	"Country Music in My Soul"	63	—	46	—	Country Music in My Soul
1972	"Travelin' Light"	52	—	20	—	Travelin' Light
1973	"Blue Train (Of the Heartbreak Line)"	22	—	5	—	International Ambassador
1973	"Dirty Old Man"	38	—	1	2	Out West Country
1973	"Second Cup of Coffee"	50	—	5	—	The Best 2
1974	"Claim On Me"	59	—	—	—	single only
1974	"Ways of a Country Girl"	—	—	23	—	Trendsetter
1974	"Back to Down East Country"	—	—	12	—	Back to Down East Country
1975	"Bad News"	—	—	10	—	Trendsetter
1976	"Bad Romancer"	—	—	37	—	Back Home at the Opry
1977	"I Wonder Who's Kissing Her Now"	81	—	—	—	Fine Lace and Homespun Cloth
1977	"May the Wind Be Always at Your Back"	—	—	—	—	Fine Lace and Homespun Cloth
1977	"Everlasting (Everlasting Love)"	93	—	—	—	Fine Lace and Homespun Cloth
1978	"Only the Best"	81	—	—	—	Feels Like a Million
1978	"Take This Heart"	—	—	—	—	Feels Like a Million
1979	"Forever Young"	—	—	21	—	Forever Young
1980	"Spin Spin"	—	—	27	—	Forever Young
1980	"Catfish Bates"	—	—	—	—	Forever Young
1984	"Music Man's Dream"	—	—	—	—	Music Man's Dream

^{A}"Now and for Always" reached No. 12 in Canada.
^{B}"Teen Commandments" reached No. 14 on the Canadian charts.
^{C}"Abilene" also peaked at No. 4 on Hot Adult Contemporary Tracks and No. 9 in Canada.
^{D}"Canadian Pacific" also peaked at No. 9 on the RPM Top Singles chart in Canada.

== Guest singles ==
Year	Single	Artist	U.S. Country	Album
1967	"Chet's Tune"	Some of Chet's Friends	38	single only
1970	"Let's Get Together"	Skeeter Davis	65	A Place in the Country

== B-sides ==
Year	B-Side	CAN Country	Original A-Side
1968	"The Canadian Railroad Trilogy"	3	"It's My Time"
1971	"North Country"	3	"West Texas Highway"
1972	"The Child's Song"	3	"Country Music in My Soul"
