= Buddy Holly: Listen to Me; The Ultimate Buddy Party =

- DVD cover
- Written by: David Leaf
- Starring: Stevie Nicks, Lyle Lovett, Raul Malo, Patrick Stump, Chris Isaak, Graham Nash, Boz Scaggs, Michelle Branch, Shawn Colvin, Cobra Starship, Paul Anka, Phil Everly.
- Music by: Buddy Holly
- Country of origin: United States
- Original language: English

Production
- Executive producers: Jennifer Cohen; Regan McCarthy
- Running time: 85 minutes

Original release
- Network: PBS
- Release: December 3, 2011

Buddy Holly: Listen to Me; The Ultimate Buddy Party is a recording of the event held on September 7, 2011, to celebrate on would have been Buddy Holly's 75th birthday, while supporting fundraising for PBS. Produced by Songmasters, with Peter Asher acting as music supervisor and producer and Waddy Wachtel as music director, the event brought together artists such as Stevie Nicks, Lyle Lovett, Raul Malo, Patrick Stump, Chris Isaak, Graham Nash, Boz Scaggs, Michelle Branch, Shawn Colvin, Cobra Starship, Paul Anka, Phil Everly, James Burton, and Albert Lee. Others, such as Keith Richards, Ringo Starr, Jackson Browne, shared memories via video message. Buddy's widow Maria Elena Holly, seated beside Phil Everly was in attendance, singing along with every song. The event was also filmed for a PBS pledge drive special featured throughout USA during December 2011 and May/June 2012.

== PBS Pledge Special Track Listing ==
No.	Title	Music	Length
1.	"Not Fade Away"	Stevie Nicks
2.	"Well... All Right"	Lyle Lovett
3.	"I'm Lookin' for Someone to Love"	Lyle Lovett
4.	"True Love Ways"	Raul Malo
5.	"Everyday"	Patrick Stump
6.	"Oh, Boy"	Patrick Stump
7.	"It's So Easy"	Stevie Nicks
8.	"Crying Waiting Hoping"	Chris Isaak
9.	"Raining in My Heart"	Graham Nash
10.	"Maybe Baby"	Boz Scaggs
11.	"Rave On"	Boz Scaggs with Graham Nash and Peter Asher
12.	"Heartbeat"	Chris Isaak and Michelle Branch
13.	"Learning the Game"	Shawn Colvin
14.	"Peggy Sue"	Cobra Starship
15.	"It Doesn't Matter Anymore"	Paul Anka
16.	"Listen to Me"	Raul Malo
17.	"That'll Be the Day"	All-Star Finale
