= Motown 40 Forever =

Compilation album by Various Artists
- Released: January 27, 1998
- Genre: R&B, pop, soul, funk, disco, dance-pop, quiet storm

Motown 40 Forever is a compilation album released to commemorate the 40th anniversary of Motown Records.

== Track listing ==
Disc one
No.	Title	Artist	Length
1.	"Please Mr. Postman"	The Marvelettes	2:27
2.	"Shop Around"	Smokey Robinson & the Miracles	2:46
3.	"(Love Is Like a) Heat Wave"	Martha & the Vandellas	2:43
4.	"My Guy"	Mary Wells	2:53
5.	"Ain't Nothing Like the Real Thing"	Marvin Gaye & Tammi Terrell	2:15
6.	"I Can't Help Myself (Sugar Pie, Honey Bunch)"	The Four Tops	2:43
7.	"Baby, I'm for Real"	The Originals	3:18
8.	"What Becomes of the Brokenhearted"	Jimmy Ruffin	2:59
9.	"Keep on Truckin'"	Eddie Kendricks	3:32
10.	"ABC"	The Jackson 5	2:57
11.	"Stop! In the Name of Love"	The Supremes	2:53
12.	"My Cherie Amour"	Stevie Wonder	2:53
13.	"Neither One of Us (Wants to Be the First to Say Goodbye)"	Gladys Knight & the Pips	4:22
14.	"Just My Imagination (Running Away with Me)"	The Temptations	3:47
15.	"What's Going On"	Marvin Gaye	3:42
16.	"Someday We'll Be Together"	Diana Ross & the Supremes	3:27
17.	"Papa Was a Rollin' Stone"	The Temptations	6:58
18.	"I'll Be There"	The Jackson 5	3:58
19.	"Tears of a Clown"	Smokey Robinson & the Miracles	3:00
20.	"When You Tell Me That You Love Me"	Diana Ross	3:00
21.	"Dancing in the Street"	Martha & the Vandellas	2:39

Disc two
No.	Title	Artist	Length
1.	"Super Freak"	Rick James	3:24
2.	"Let It Whip"	Dazz Band	4:06
3.	"Rub You the Right Way"	Johnny Gill	4:14
4.	"Let's Get Serious"	Jermaine Jackson	3:33
5.	"Fire and Desire"	Rick James & Teena Marie	5:46
6.	"Somebody's Watching Me"	Rockwell	3:55
7.	"My Girl"	The Temptations	2:43
8.	"War"	Edwin Starr	3:22
9.	"I'm Coming Out"	Diana Ross	3:54
10.	"All Night Long (All Night)"	Lionel Richie	4:15
11.	"All This Love"	DeBarge	4:09
12.	"Three Times a Lady"	Commodores	3:38
13.	"I Love Your Smile"	Shanice	4:23
14.	"I'll Make Love to You"	Boyz II Men	3:58
15.	"Superstition"	Stevie Wonder	4:01
16.	"Let's Get It On"	Marvin Gaye	4:01
17.	"Him or Me"	Today	4:20
18.	"Don't Look Any Further"	Dennis Edwards & Siedah Garrett	4:04
19.	"I Want You Back"	The Jackson 5	4:20

== Charts ==
Chart (1998)	Peak position
New Zealand Albums (RMNZ)	36
UK Compilation Albums (OCC)	15
UK R&B Albums (OCC)	8
US Billboard 200	65
US Top R&B/Hip-Hop Albums (Billboard)	38
