= Fire and Rain (song) =

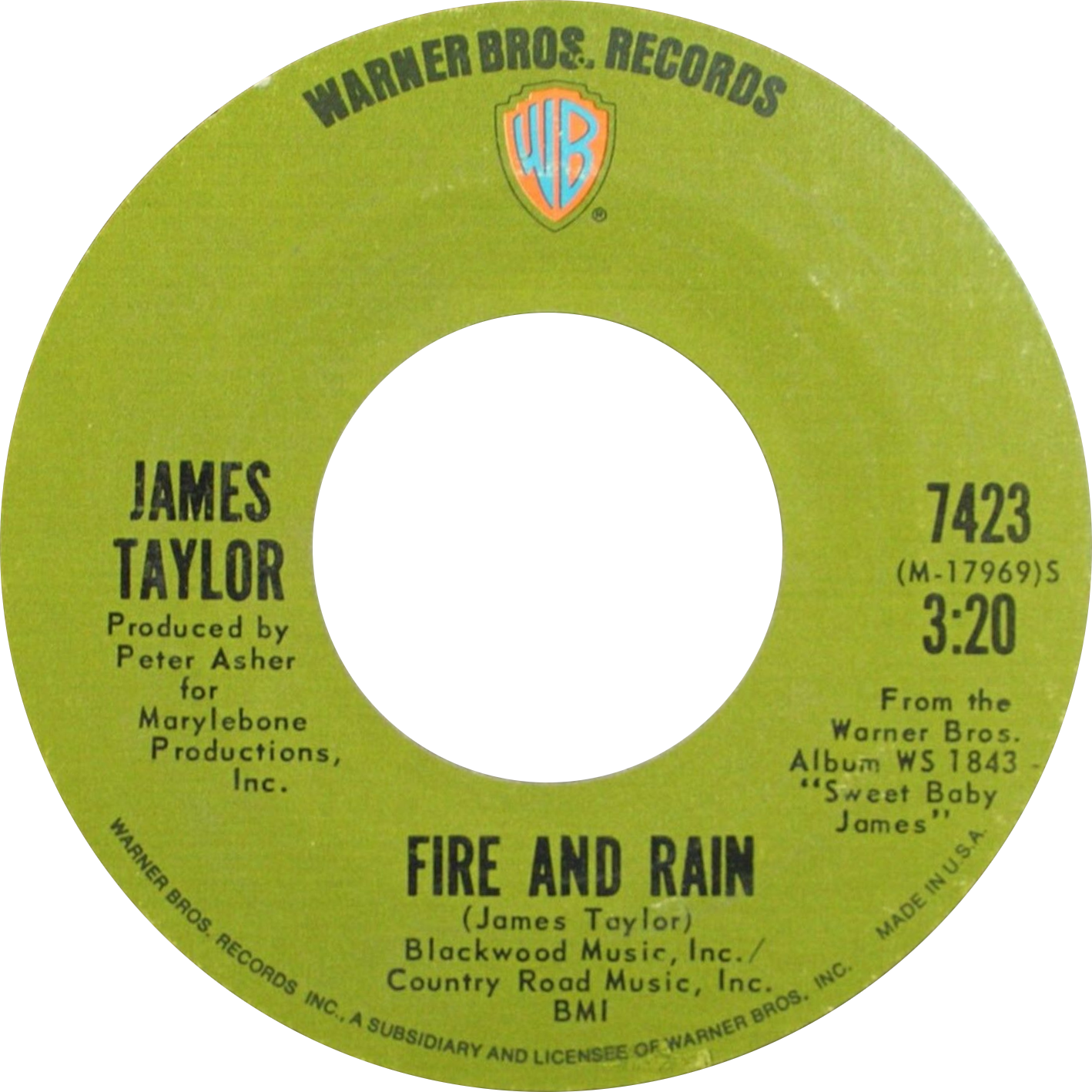
- Side A of the US single

Single by James Taylor

from the album Sweet Baby James
- B-side: "Anywhere Like Heaven" (US); "Sunny Skies" (UK)
- Released: August 1970
- Recorded: December 1969
- Studio: Sunset Sound
- Genre: Folk rock; soft rock
- Length: 3:20
- Label: Warner Bros.
- Songwriter: James Taylor
- Producer: Peter Asher

James Taylor singles chronology
"Sweet Baby James" (1970)	"Fire and Rain" (1970)	"Country Road" (1970)

"Fire and Rain" is a song written and performed by American singer-songwriter James Taylor, released in August 1970 by Warner Bros. Records as the second single from Taylor's second studio album, Sweet Baby James. The song follows Taylor's reaction to the suicide of Suzanne Schnerr, a childhood friend, and his experiences with drug addiction and fame. After its release, "Fire and Rain" peaked at number two on RPM's Canada Top Singles chart and at number three on the Billboard Hot 100, becoming Taylor's first top ten hit.

== Background and composition ==
On the VH1 series Storytellers, Taylor said the song was about several incidents during his early recording career. The second line, "Suzanne, the plans they made put an end to you", refers to Suzanne Schnerr, a childhood friend of his who died by suicide while he was in London, England, recording his first album. In that same account, Taylor said he had been in a deep depression after his new band, the Flying Machine, failed to coalesce (the lyric "Sweet dreams and Flying Machines in pieces on the ground"; the reference is to the name of the band rather than a fatal plane crash, as was long rumored). Taylor completed writing the song while in rehab.

In 2005, during an interview on NPR, Taylor explained to host Scott Simon that the song was written in three parts:

- The first part was about Schnerr, who died while Taylor was in London working on his first album after being signed to Apple Records. Friends at home, concerned that it might distract Taylor from his big break, kept the news from him, and he found out six months later.
- The second part details Taylor's struggle to overcome drug addiction and depression.
- The third part deals with coming to grips with fame and fortune, looking back at the road that got him there. It includes a reference to James Taylor and the Flying Machine, a band he briefly worked with before his big break with Paul McCartney, Peter Asher, and Apple Records.

Carole King played piano on the song. Drummer Russ Kunkel used brushes rather than sticks on his drum kit, and Bobby West played double bass in place of a bass guitar to "underscore the melancholy on the song".

== Reception ==
Record World said that the release of Taylor's version as a single after several cover versions had been released "was bound to come along. With so many versions out there is no reason the excellent original will not be THE one." Cash Box similarly referred to Taylor releasing it as a single, saying: "Now, the fourth or fifth to release his own 'Fire & Rain,' Taylor may have found his sought after single hit the hard way. The 'original' comes in the wake of R. B. Greaves' sales and Johnny Rivers' current treatment (not to mention BS&T's album track getting further notice)." Billboard described it as a "poignant ballad."

Broadcast Music, Inc. ranked "Fire and Rain" at number 82 on its "Top 100 Songs of the Century" list, while voters for the National Endowment for the Arts and Recording Industry Association of America's Songs of the Century list, which comprises 365 songs of "historical significance" recorded from 1900 to 2000, placed "Fire and Rain" at number 85. In April 2011, the song was named at number 227 on Rolling Stone's list of 500 greatest songs of all time. In September 2021, Rolling Stone updated their ranking of the 500 greatest songs of all time, moving the song up to number 146.

In 1998, the 1970 recording of "Fire and Rain" by James Taylor on Warner Bros. Records was inducted into the Grammy Hall of Fame.

Rick Beato (2019) has listed the introduction to "Fire and Rain" as number 13 on his list of top 20 acoustic signature hooks.

== Chart performance ==
=== Weekly charts ===
James Taylor
Chart (1970)	Peak position
Australia KMR	6
Canada Top Singles (RPM)	2
UK Singles (Official Charts)	42
US Adult Contemporary (Billboard)	7
US Billboard Hot 100	3
US Cashbox Top 100	4

=== Year-end charts ===
James Taylor
Chart (1970)	Rank
Australia	87
Canada	26
U.S. Billboard Hot 100	67
U.S. Cash Box	85

=== Other versions ===
R. B. Greaves
Chart (1970)	Peak position
US Adult Contemporary (Billboard)	37
US Billboard Hot 100	82
US Cashbox Top 100	65
Australia (Kent Music Report)	82
Canada (RPM)	74

Johnny Rivers
Chart (1970)	Peak position
US Billboard Hot 100	94
US Cashbox Top 100	71

Marcia Hines
Chart (1975)	Peak position
Australia (Kent Music Report)	17

Willie Nelson
Chart (1976)	Peak position
Canada Country Singles (RPM)	44
US Hot Country Singles (Billboard)	29

== Certifications ==
Region	Certification	Certified units/sales
United Kingdom (BPI)	Gold	400,000^{‡}
^{‡} Sales+streaming figures based on certification alone.

== Cover versions ==
R. B. Greaves and Johnny Rivers first released singles of "Fire and Rain" in 1970. Warner Brothers released Taylor's original as a single later that year, in August 1970. Greaves' and Rivers' versions peaked at numbers 82 and 94 on the Billboard Hot 100, respectively.

Billboard predicted that Greaves' version would be a hit and said that "The James Taylor song is a natural and the production matches the song in merit." Record World also predicted it to be a hit and said that Taylor and Greaves "are perfect together."

Record World called Rivers' version "top quality stuff." Cash Box said of Rivers' version that "the tang of country pop and a top forty arrangement make this the most commercial single yet on 'Fire & Rain.'"

Marcia Hines covered "Fire and Rain" on her 1975 debut LP, Marcia Shines. Her version reached No. 17 in Australia. At the 1975 Australian Record Awards, the song won Hines Female Vocal Single of the Year.

The song was covered on Glee in the episode "The Quarterback" in tribute to the character Finn Hudson, following the passing of actor Cory Monteith.

== References in other works ==
Carole King said that her song "You've Got a Friend", which Taylor recorded, was a response to the line in the refrain, "I've seen lonely times when I could not find a friend."

In a live performance in New York City Madison Square Garden, Taylor Swift tells of her love for "Fire and Rain", relays how she found out that she was named after James Taylor and sings it with him on stage.

== Parodies ==
Taylor performs "Fire and Rain" on The Simpsons in the episode "Deep Space Homer". While singing the song for the crew of a Space Shuttle (including Homer Simpson and Buzz Aldrin), he changes the line "Sweet dreams and flying machines in pieces on the ground" to "Sweet dreams and flying machines, flying safely through the air" when he realizes that the original lyrics might upset the astronauts, who are in danger of crashing their shuttle.

In 2015, Taylor appeared on The Late Show with Stephen Colbert, where he sang a version including numerous references to post-1970 popular culture.
