= James Taylor (album) =

Studio album by James Taylor
- Released: December 6, 1968
- Recorded: July–October 1968
- Studio: Trident, London
- Length: 38:30
- Label: Apple
- Producer: Peter Asher

James Taylor chronology
| James Taylor (1968) | Sweet Baby James (1970) |

Singles from James Taylor
- 1. "Carolina in My Mind" Released: February 1969; 2. "Knocking 'Round the Zoo" Released: 1969; 3. "Something in the Way She Moves" Released: 1968

James Taylor is the debut studio album by the American singer-songwriter James Taylor. Released on December 6, 1968, it was the first recording by a non-British artist released by Apple Records, and would also be Taylor's only release on that label. The album was released under the title First Album on the South African market.

== Background ==
The album was produced by Peter Asher, who was A&R head for The Beatles' newly formed label Apple Records. Taylor recorded the album from July to October 1968 at Trident Studios, at the same time as the Beatles were recording the White Album. Trident was the most technologically advanced studio in England at the time and was in high demand; some session time booked by The Beatles was used instead to record Taylor's album. Paul McCartney and Peter Asher brought in arranger Richard Hewson to add orchestrations to several of the songs and unusual "link" passages in between them; these would receive a mixed reception at best.

== Songs ==
Notable songs include "Something in the Way She Moves", "Carolina in My Mind" and "Rainy Day Man". McCartney and an uncredited George Harrison guested on bass and backing vocals respectively on "Carolina in My Mind", the lyric of which, "holy host of others standing around me", made reference to The Beatles, while the title phrase of Taylor's "Something in the Way She Moves" provided the starting point for Harrison's "Something". (Coincidentally, Taylor has said he had meant for the song to be called "I Feel Fine" – after a dominant line in the chorus – but the title had already been taken by a Beatles song.) Taylor also recorded a very early version of "Fire and Rain", which would be his breakthrough hit on his second album, but Asher did not choose it for the album release.

== Release and reception ==
Professional ratings
Review scores
| Source | Rating |
|---|---|
| AllMusic | 4.5/5 stars |
| Encyclopedia of Popular Music | 3/5 stars |
| Mojo | 4/5 stars |
| MusicHound Rock | 3.5/5 |
| Rolling Stone | (favorable) |
| Rolling Stone Album Guide | 3.5/5 stars |
| Tom Hull | B− |

The album was released in the UK by Apple Records on December 6, 1968, and on February 17, 1969 in the US. Critical reaction was generally good, including a very positive Jon Landau review in Rolling Stone Magazine that said "this album is the coolest breath of fresh air I've inhaled in a good long while. It knocks me out." The record's commercial potential suffered from Taylor's inability to promote it due to his hospitalization for drug addiction and it sold poorly. "Carolina in My Mind" b/w "Something's Wrong" was released as a single in the UK (APPLE 32) in February 1969, but failed to chart. It was released as a single in the US (Apple 1805) in March 1969, but reached only number 118. "Knocking 'Round the Zoo" was issued as a single in France (APF 506) backed with "Something's Wrong".

Because of difficulties in obtaining licensing rights from Apple during the 1970s, "Something in the Way She Moves" and "Carolina in My Mind" were re-recorded in 1976 for Taylor's Greatest Hits album.

"Rainy Day Man" was re-recorded in 1979 for Taylor's Flag album.

== Track listing ==
All tracks written by James Taylor unless otherwise noted. Times are from the original Apple LP vinyl label.

Side one

1. "Don't Talk Now" – 2:36
2. "Something's Wrong" – 3:00
3. "Knocking 'Round the Zoo" – 3:26
4. "Sunshine Sunshine" – 3:30
5. "Taking It In" – 3:01
6. "Something in the Way She Moves" – 2:26

Side two

7. "Carolina in My Mind" – 3:36
8. "Brighten Your Night With My Day" – 3:05
9. "Night Owl" – 3:38
10. "Rainy Day Man" (Taylor, Zach Wiesner) – 3:00
11. "Circle Round the Sun" (Traditional; arranged by Taylor) – 3:24
12. "The Blues Is Just a Bad Dream" – 3:42

CD bonus tracks (2010 remaster)

13. "Sunny Skies" (Demo) – 2:12
14. "Let Me Ride" (Demo) – 3:57
15. "Sunshine Sunshine" (Demo) – 2:51
16. "Carolina in My Mind" (Demo) – 3:06

== Personnel ==
- James Taylor – lead vocals, acoustic guitar (all tracks), electric guitar (9), percussion (1)
- Mick Wayne – guitar (7)
- Louis Cennamo – bass guitar (1–3, 5, 8–10)
- Paul McCartney – bass guitar (7)
- Skaila Kanga – harp (4)
- Richard Hewson – orchestrations (2–4, 7–9, 11, 12)
- Don Shinn (misspelled "Schinn") – organ (1), harpsichord (1,5,6–intro link), electric piano (8)
- Freddie Redd – organ (7)
- George Harrison – backing vocals (7) (uncredited)
- Bishop O'Brien – drums (2, 3, 5, 7–11)
- Peter Asher – percussion (1), vocals (1, 7, 10), tambourine (7)

== Charts ==
| Chart (1969/71) | Peak position |
|---|---|
| Australia (Kent Music Report) | 12 |
