= Your Smiling Face =

- Dutch cover

Single by James Taylor

from the album JT
- B-side: "If I Keep My Heart Out of Sight"
- Released: September 1977
- Genre: Pop; soft rock
- Length: 2:30
- Label: Columbia
- Songwriter: James Taylor
- Producer: Peter Asher

James Taylor singles chronology
"Handy Man" (1977)	"Your Smiling Face" (1977)	"Honey Don't Leave L.A." (1977)

"Your Smiling Face" is a song by singer James Taylor. First available on the album JT, and released as the album's sophomore single in September 1977, "Your Smiling Face" peaked at number 11 in Cash Box magazine and at 20 on the Billboard Hot 100 near year's end. It reached number 11 on the RPM Top Singles chart in Canada. On Billboard's Adult Contemporary chart, it reached number 6.

== Background ==
Lines like "Isn't it amazing a man like me can feel this way?" reflect Taylor's surprise at his newfound happiness in his relationship with Carly Simon. Rolling Stone critic Peter Herbst described it as being "unabashedly happy". However, according to Taylor biographer Timothy White, the song was written for Taylor's and Simon's then three-year-old daughter Sally. White described the song as a "pop sonnet".

== Reception ==
Billboard described the song as a "strong followup" to "Handy Man" and described the melody as being "upbeat" and "infectious." Taylor described it as a "good, light-hearted pop love song". Cash Box said that "some whimsical vocal gymnastics that add the crucial personal touch." Record World said that it is "more energetic" than Taylor's previous single "Handy Man" and that its tempo is "engaging." Herbst praised Taylor's vocal for being "a pretty convincing rock singer" on the song.

== Live performances ==
"Your Smiling Face" was a fixture in Taylor's live shows, but he had to abandon it for a while because he went through a period where he had difficulty reaching the falsetto notes.

== Personnel ==
- James Taylor – lead vocals, acoustic guitar
- Danny Kortchmar – electric guitar
- Leland Sklar – bass
- Clarence McDonald – piano
- Russell Kunkel – drums
- David Campbell – string arrangements, conductor

== Chart performance ==
=== Weekly charts ===
Chart (1977–78)	Peak position
Canada Top Singles (RPM)	11
Canada Adult Contemporary (RPM)	4
US Billboard Hot 100	20
US Adult Contemporary (Billboard)	6
US Cash Box Top 100	12

=== Year-end charts ===
Chart (1977)	Rank
Canada RPM Top Singles	140

== Popular culture ==
- The song was used in the 1978 film FM, starring Michael Brandon and Eileen Brennan.
- It was parodied in the South Park episode "Fat Camp" as "The Prostitute Song."
- On Sesame Street, Taylor sang a parody of the song to Oscar the Grouch titled "Whenever I See your Grouchy Face".
- The trailer for season one of the Adult Swim show Smiling Friends uses the song.
