= 1967 (James Taylor album) =

Compilation album by James Taylor and the Original Flying Machine
- Released: February 1971
- Recorded: 1966
- Genre: Rock
- Length: 22:48
- Label: Euphoria
- Producer: Al Gorgoni; Chip Taylor

James Taylor chronology
Sweet Baby James (1970)	1967 (1971)	Mud Slide Slim and the Blue Horizon (1971)

Singles from 1967
- 1. "Brighten Your Night with My Day" Released: February 1971

Professional ratings
Review scores
Source	Rating
AllMusic	3/5 stars
The Rolling Stone Album Guide	1/5 stars
Encyclopedia of Popular Music	1/5 stars

1967 is an archival release of 1966 recordings of American singer-songwriter James Taylor's band The Flying Machine (not to be confused with The Flying Machine of "Smile a Little Smile for Me" fame from 1969), first released in February 1971.

== History ==
The songs on the album were recorded with Taylor's band The Flying Machine in a late 1966 three-hour session in New York City's Select Sound Studios. They were produced by Chip Taylor, who had been involved in some recent pop hits, and Al Gorgoni, who also added harpsichord to the band's sound. The group felt the resulting tracks were of only demo quality. After "Night Owl" (b/w "Brighten Your Night with My Day") was released as an unsuccessful single by Jay Gee Records, a subsidiary of Jubilee Records, no work towards an album release went forward.

Taylor subsequently signed with Apple Records, failed commercially again, but then became a huge success with Warner Bros. Records on Sweet Baby James in 1970 and Mud Slide Slim and the Blue Horizon in 1971. Euphoria Records then released the sessions using the name "The Original Flying Machine", to distinguish the group from the UK outfit The Flying Machine who had emerged in 1969 with the hit song "Smile a Little Smile for Me". The released album had modest success capitalizing on Taylor's fame, reaching #74 on the U.S. pop albums chart. Flying Machine member Danny Kortchmar was not pleased, saying "The people involved wouldn't spring for the money for a whole album of James' songs [in 1967]. So it seemed terrible years later when the same people put out the Flying Machine album of those few sessions."

The sessions were re-released by Gadfly Records, with additional short intros and two remixes, in 1996.

== Track listing ==
All tracks are written by James Taylor, except "Kootch's Song" by Danny Kortchmar.

Side one
No.	Title	Length
1.	"Night Owl"	2:36
2.	"Brighten Your Night with My Day"	4:10
3.	"Kootch's Song"	3:11
4.	"Knocking 'Round the Zoo" (Danny Kortchmar lead vocal)	3:17

Side two
No.	Title	Length
1.	"Rainy Day Man"	3:07
2.	"Knocking 'Round the Zoo" (James Taylor lead vocal)	4:48
3.	"Something's Wrong" (track)	2:58

=== 1996 reissue ===
1. "Rainy Day Man" (James Taylor, Zach Wiesner) 3:16
2. "Knocking 'Round the Zoo" (Intro) 0:53
3. "Knocking 'Round the Zoo" (James Taylor Lead Vocal) 3:10
4. "Something's Wrong" (Backing Track) 3:07
5. "Night Owl" 2:29
6. "Brighten Your Night With My Day" (Intro) 1:01
7. "Brighten Your Night With My Day" 2:45
8. "Kootch's Song" (Danny Kortchmar) 3:13
9. "Knocking 'Round the Zoo" (Danny Kortchmar Lead Vocal) 2:59
10. "Night Owl" (Remixed version)
11. "Knocking 'Round the Zoo" (Remixed version)

== Personnel ==
The Flying Machine

- James Taylor — guitar, vocals
- Danny Kortchmar — guitar, vocals
- Zachary Wiesner — bass
- Joel O'Brien — drums

Additional recording musician

- Al Gorgoni — harpsichord

Production

- Engineers: Wally Sheffey, Eddie Youngblood

== Charts ==
Album

Year	Chart	Position
1971	Pop Albums	74
