= Handy Man (song) =

1959 song composed by Otis Blackwell, Jimmy Jones performed by Jimmy Jones

Single by Jimmy Jones
- B-side: "The Search Is Over"
- Released: December 1959
- Recorded: 1959
- Genre: Rock and roll; soul
- Length: 1:58
- Label: Cub (US); MGM (other)
- Songwriters: Jimmy Jones, Otis Blackwell
- Producer: Otis Blackwell

Jimmy Jones singles chronology
"Handy Man" (1959)	"Good Timin'" (1960)

"Handy Man"

Single by Del Shannon

from the album Handy Man
- B-side: Give Her Lots of Lovin'
- Released: 1964
- Length: 2:11
- Label: Amy
- Songwriters: Jimmy Jones, Otis Blackwell

Del Shannon singles chronology
"Mary Jane" (1964)	"Handy Man" (1964)	"Do You Want to Dance" (1964)

"Handy Man"
- Dutch cover

Single by James Taylor

from the album JT
- B-side: "Bartender's Blues"
- Released: June 1977
- Genre: Soft rock
- Length: 3:17
- Label: Columbia
- Songwriters: Jimmy Jones, Otis Blackwell
- Producer: Peter Asher

James Taylor singles chronology
"Secret O' Life" (1977)	"Handy Man" (1977)	"Your Smiling Face" (1977)

"Handy Man" is a song written by singer Jimmy Jones and songwriter Otis Blackwell. Recordings by Del Shannon and The Sparks of Rhythm list Charles Merenstein as a co-writer, as does BMI. The Sparks of Rhythm version on the Apollo 541 single version released in 1959 credits Andrew Barksdale and Merenstein as writers, omitting Jimmy Jones. The song is noted for Jones singing "Come-a, come-a come-a come-a, come come-a, yeah", which is heard at the beginning and in the coda of the song, before the song's fade.

It was originally recorded by The Sparks of Rhythm, a group Jones had been a member of when he wrote it, although he was not with them when they recorded it. That version was in a minor key and had a different melody. When Jimmy Jones recorded it, the song was changed to a major key, with a different melody. In 1959, Jones recorded the song himself, in a version which had been reworked by Blackwell, who produced the session. Blackwell also provided the whistling, which is prominently heard throughout the song. "Handy Man" became a million seller, reaching No. 3 on the R&B charts, No. 2 on the Billboard Hot 100 in 1960 behind "Theme from A Summer Place" by Percy Faith, and No. 3 in Canada.

The song was a hit again in 1964, reaching No. 22 for Del Shannon and No. 10 in Canada, and yet again in 1977 for James Taylor. Taylor's version peaked at No. 1 in September 1977 on the RPM Top Singles chart.

Measured by chart performance, Taylor's version of the song was the most successful. It reached No. 2 on the Cash Box Top 100 chart and No. 4 on the Billboard Hot 100. It also hit No. 1 on the Adult Contemporary chart. Taylor's version also earned him his second Grammy Award for Best Male Pop Vocal Performance. Taylor's version featured Leah Kunkel as backup singer, singing the "comma comma" sections in harmony, which is heard after the second verse and in the coda of the song.

AllMusic critic Jason Elias compares Jones' original with Taylor's version, stating that "where Jones’s version was chipper and a little obnoxious", Taylor's version "is so laid back it’s almost somnolent". Elias notes that Taylor's slower version has the benefit of allowing him to shade the words in new ways. Elias also praises Taylor's guitar playing. Billboard described Taylor's version as "fluidly soft and laid back throughout" with spice added by the background harmonies. Cash Box said that "Taylor lends his unmistakable voice to a song originally made famous by Jimmy Jones in 1960" and that "the arrangement is stretched out, the general tenor is mellow, and Peter Asher's production ear has kept all the sounds in a tasteful balance". Record World said that "Taylor's reading of it transforms the frantic pace of [Jones' and Shannon's] hits into a slow, considered ballad."

== James Taylor version personnel ==
- James Taylor – lead vocals, acoustic guitar, background vocals
- Danny Kortchmar – electric guitar
- Leland Sklar – bass guitar
- Clarence McDonald – Rhodes piano
- Russell Kunkel – drums
- Leah Kunkel – background vocals
- Peter Asher – cabasa, congas

== Other versions ==
- Culture Club were accused by Jimmy Jones of plagiarizing their 1983 hit "Karma Chameleon" from "Handy Man", for its apparent lifting of the "comma, comma" section. Culture Club frontman Boy George has denied consciously plagiarizing the song: "I might have heard it once, but it certainly wasn't something I sat down and said, 'Yeah, I want to copy this.'"

== See also ==
- List of number-one adult contemporary singles of 1977 (U.S.)
