= Sweet Baby James (song) =

Single by James Taylor

from the album Sweet Baby James
- B-side: "Suite for 20 G"
- Released: April 1970
- Recorded: December 1969 at Sunset Sound
- Genre: Western; lullaby; country folk
- Length: 2:54
- Label: Warner Bros. Records
- Songwriter: James Taylor
- Producer: Peter Asher

James Taylor singles chronology
"Knocking 'Round the Zoo" (1969)	"Sweet Baby James" (1970)	"Fire and Rain" (1970)

"Sweet Baby James" is a song written and recorded by James Taylor that serves as the opening and title track from his 1970 breakthrough album Sweet Baby James. It was released as the first single from the album but did not chart. Nonetheless, it is one of his best-known and most popular tunes. Taylor considers it his best song.

"Sweet Baby James" was included on Taylor's diamond-selling Greatest Hits 1976 compilation.

== History ==
The song was written by Taylor for the son of his older brother Alex, who was also named James (and indeed was named after him). Deliberately a cross between a cowboy song and a lullaby, it was first thought up by Taylor as he was driving through Carolina to meet his infant nephew for the first time.

Taylor spent considerable effort on the lyrics, whose verses he later said used the most intricate rhyming pattern of his career. One of the most famous parts of the lyric is:

Now the first of December was covered with snow
And so was the turnpike from Stockbridge to Boston
Lord, the Berkshires seemed dream-like on account of that frostin
With ten miles behind me and ten thousand more to go

The song is composed as a waltz, in 3/4 time. The chorus echoes the lullaby sentiment, with a reference to "Rock-a-bye Baby".

According to Allmusic critic Bill Janovitz, the two verses contrast the new baby James, as a lonely cowboy, in the first verse with the lonely grown-up James singing in the second verse. On the other hand, author James Perrone suggests that the young cowboy James in the first verse as well as the James traveling the Massachusetts Turnpike in the second verse are both the adult James who is singing the song. Perrone notes that the two are linked near the end of the song when Taylor sings that the nighttime dreams of the first stanza cowboy and the dreams of the second stanza traveller "still inspire all who 'take to the highway.'"

On ABC's Good Morning America on September 15, 2008, Taylor acknowledged "there was that element" of being a "self lullaby" given the song's title and the "singing works just fine for me" lyric.

== Critical reception ==
Reviewing the single, Record World called it "a beauty of a winner." Billboard said that "Taylor has a strong and poignant piece of ballad material which he performs for all it's worth." Cash Box said that it "has already received considerable FM exposure and could break into AM playlists in its pulled-single offering."

== Live performance history ==
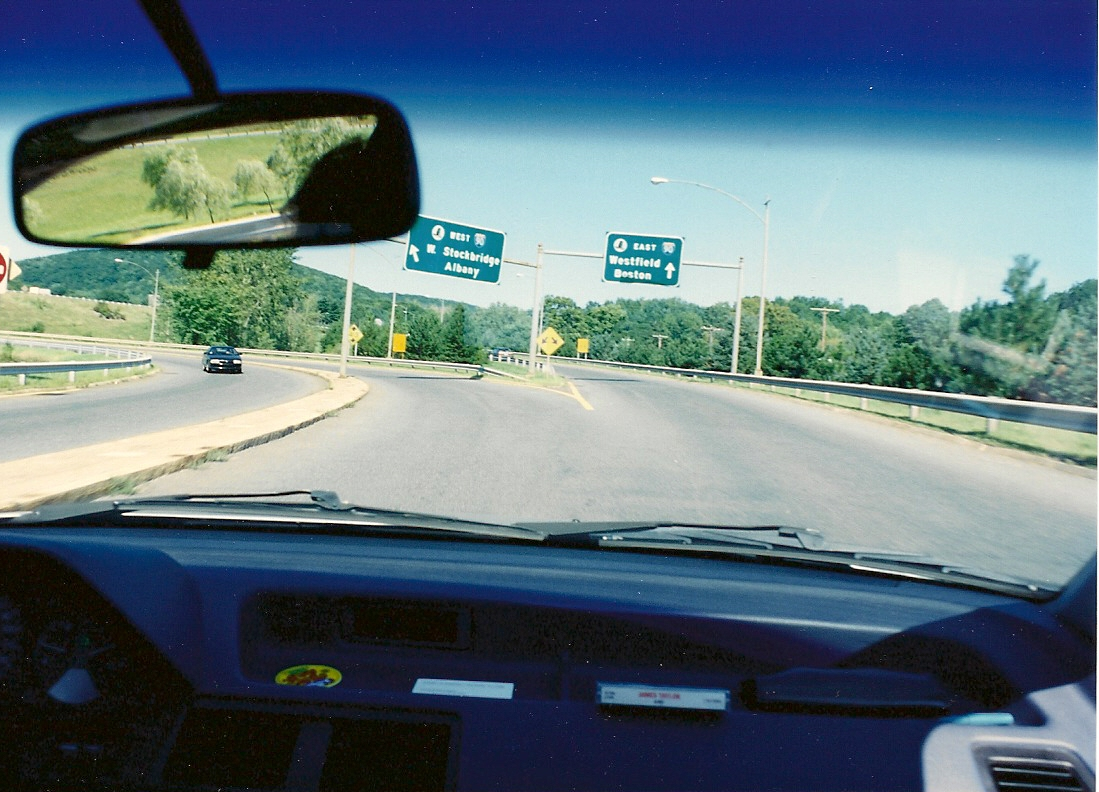
The Massachusetts Turnpike and signs from Stockbridge to Boston.

"Sweet Baby James" has been played at almost every Taylor concert since its release. It is often saved for near or at the end of shows, where it serves as the emotional climax with Taylor performing it as the last encore coming back on stage without his band (as was the case for over a decade), or perhaps with just a keyboard player accompanying his guitar.

Invariably, the second verse mentions of the Massachusetts Turnpike, Stockbridge, The Berkshires, and Boston bring cheers from people in the audience who had lived in Massachusetts. And if the concert is in Tanglewood or Great Woods, the commotion is enough to pause the song. Taylor was born in Boston, and although he moved to North Carolina when very young, he spent summers in Massachusetts and went to boarding school there. This association has made Taylor a regional favorite in New England, including sell-outs at Tanglewood and a record-setting concert stand at Great Woods. Taylor, who underwent treatment at the Austen Riggs Center in Stockbridge in his younger years and later became a resident of the Berkshires, has spoken of the song's geographical reference points: "I really did drive the turnpike from Stockbridge to Boston. I have a real connection to this place."

He performed the song as part of his set on the first episode of Saturday Night Live's second season, which aired September 18, 1976. 15 years later, Taylor performed the song again on the Christmas episode of Saturday Night Live's on December 14, 1991.

Jay Leno requested Taylor's live performance of the song on his final The Tonight Show (first stint) on May 29, 2009. He said he had listened to it on the car radio as he left Boston for Los Angeles in the early 1970s and that the "ten miles behind, ten thousand more to go" line resonated deeply with him.

Taylor performed the song when campaigning for Deval Patrick's re-election during the Massachusetts gubernatorial election, 2010, and the "Stockbridge to Boston" line drew a huge reaction in that context as well.
