= Jimmy Jones (singer) =

American singer-songwriter (1930–2012)

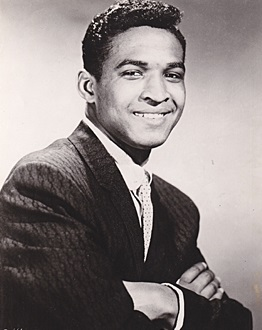
- Jones in the 1960s

Background information
- Born: James Jones; June 2, 1930; Birmingham, Alabama, U.S.
- Died: August 2, 2012 (aged 82) Aberdeen, North Carolina, U.S.
- Genres: Pop; Rock and roll R&B
- Occupation: Singer
- Instrument: Vocals
- Years active: 1954–2012
- Labels: Cub, Ro-Jac, Vee-Jay, Roulette, Parkway, Bell (US); MGM (UK)

James Jones (June 2, 1930 – August 2, 2012) was an American singer-songwriter who moved to New York City as a teenager. His biggest hits were "Handy Man" (1959) and "Good Timin'" (1960). According to Allmusic journalist Steve Huey, Jones sang "in a smooth yet soulful falsetto modeled on the likes of Clyde McPhatter and Sam Cooke."

== Career ==
Jones was born in Birmingham, Alabama. His first job in the entertainment industry was as a tap dancer. He joined a doo-wop group named the Berliners in 1954. They later changed their name to Sparks of Rhythm. In 1955 Jones co-wrote "Handy Man", which was recorded by the Sparks of Rhythm in 1956 (after Jones left the group). After recording with other groups, Jones went solo and, in 1959, teamed up with Otis Blackwell who reworked "Handy Man" which Jones recorded on the MGM subsidiary Cub Records. When the flute player did not show up for the session, Blackwell famously whistled on the recording. "Handy Man", released in 1959, gave Jones his first US and UK hit single. It went to No. 2 on the Billboard Hot 100 in 1960, and peaked at No. 3 in the UK Singles Chart. It introduced a rock falsetto singing style to the British audience and later scored hits for Del Shannon and James Taylor. A few months later in 1960, Jones' recording of "Good Timin'" climbed to No. 1 in the UK and No. 3 in the US. Both "Handy Man" and "Good Timin'" were million sellers, earning Jones two gold discs.

Although Jones had only the two million-selling Top 40 hits, he nevertheless kept active in the music industry as both a songwriter and recording artist and made personal appearances as he saw fit. Jones' subsequent career was low key, although it included three more UK chart entries in the following 12 months. Jones remained with Cub until 1962, and then recorded for the next decade for a variety of labels, including Bell, Parkway, Roulette, and Vee-Jay.

Del Shannon cited Jones and Bill Kenny as influences on his falsetto style. Later singers who used falsetto included Frankie Valli of the Four Seasons, Lou Christie, Robert John, Jimmy Somerville, and Barry Gibb. Gibb cited Shannon, in turn, as an influence for his disco vocalizations with the Bee Gees. Jones released Grandma's Rock & Roll Party in the 1990s on CD, perhaps, in part due to his popularity in the UK Northern soul circles. It included new versions of "Handy Man" and "Good Timin'". Castle/Sanctuary released a double album titled Good Timin': The Anthology in 2002.

== Death ==
Jones died in Aberdeen, North Carolina on August 2, 2012. He was 82.

== Discography ==
=== Singles ===
Year	Single	Chart Positions				Album
Year	Single	US	UK	AU	CAN	Album
1959	"Handy Man" b/w "The Search Is Over"	2	3	4	3	Good Timin'
1959	"You For Me To Love" b/w "Whenever You Need Me"	-	-	-	-	Non-album tracks
1960	"With All My Heart" b/w "Please Say You're Mine"	-	-	-	-	Non-album tracks
1960	"Lover" b/w "Plain Old Love"	-	-	-	-	Non-album tracks
1960	"Good Timin'" b/w "My Precious Angel"	3	1	7	6	Good Timin'
1960	"I Just Go for You" /	-	35	-	-	Good Timin'
1960	"That's When I Cried"	83	-	67	30	Non-album tracks
1960	"EE-I EE-I Oh! (Sue MacDonald)" /	102	-	82	-	Non-album tracks
1960	"Itchin'"	106	-	82	-	Non-album tracks
1960	"Ready for Love" b/w "For You"	-	46	-	-	Good Timin'
1961	"I Told You So" b/w "You Got It"	85	33	-	-	Non-album tracks
1961	"I Say Love" b/w "Dear One"	-	-	-	-	Non-album tracks
1961	"Mr. Music Man" b/w "Holler Hey"	-	-	-	-	Non-album tracks
1962	"You're Much Too Young" b/w "The Nights Of Mexico"	-	-	-	-	Non-album tracks
1963	"Mr. Fix It" b/w "No Insurance (For A Broken Heart)"	-	-	-	-	Non-album tracks
1965	"Walkin'" b/w "Pardon Me"	-	-	-	-	Non-album tracks
1966	"Don't You Just Know It" b/w "Dynamite"	-	-	-	-	Non-album tracks
1967	"39-21-40 Shape" b/w "Personal Property"	-	-	-	-	Non-album tracks
1967	"True Love Ways" b/w "Snap My Fingers"	-	-	-	-	Non-album tracks
1974	"The Man from Candyland" b/w "Big Leg Woman"	-	-	-	-	Timin'
1976	"Handyman Is Back in Town"—Part 1 b/w Part 2	-	-	-	-	Handyman's Back In Town (Part II)
1987	"Send Her Back to Me" b/w "Shag"	-	-	-	-	Non-album tracks
