= Otis Blackwell =

American songwriter (1931–2002)

Background information
- Also known as: John Davenport
- Born: February 16, 1931; Brooklyn, New York, U.S.
- Died: May 6, 2002 (aged 71) Nashville, Tennessee, U.S.
- Genres: Blues; rock and roll; R&B
- Occupations: Songwriter, singer, pianist
- Years active: 1950s–2002
- Labels: RCA, Groove, Atlantic

Otis Blackwell (February 16, 1931 – May 6, 2002) was an American songwriter whose work influenced rock and roll. His songs include "Fever" (recorded by Little Willie John), "Great Balls of Fire" and "Breathless" (recorded by Jerry Lee Lewis), "Don't Be Cruel", "All Shook Up", and "Return to Sender" (with Winfield Scott; recorded by Elvis Presley), and "Handy Man" (recorded by Jimmy Jones).

== Biography ==
Blackwell was born in Brooklyn, New York. He learned to play the piano as a child and grew up listening to both R&B and country music.

His first success was winning a local talent contest ("Amateur Night") at the Apollo Theater in Harlem in 1952. This led to a recording contract with RCA and then with Jay-Dee. His first release was his own composition "Daddy Rolling Stone", which became a favorite in Jamaica, where it was recorded by Derek Martin. The song later became part of The Who's mod repertoire. Enjoying some early recording and performing success, he found his first love was songwriting and by 1955 had settled into the groove that he would ride for decades. His first successes as a songwriter came in 1956, when Little Willie John's R&B hit with the sultry "Fever" was an even bigger pop success for Peggy Lee, and "Don't Be Cruel" began a highly profitable association with Elvis Presley.

Blackwell was one of the leading figures of early rock and roll, although he was not well known by the public. His own records never cracked the Top 40, yet he wrote million-selling songs for Elvis Presley, Jerry Lee Lewis, Dee Clark and others. He also recruited other songwriters to write for Presley, such as Winfield Scott.

In the liner notes of Elvis' Golden Records (1958), Anne Fulchino of RCA Records, wrote,

While sipping coffee, Steve Sholes pulled out a demonstration record of "Don't Be Cruel" and told Elvis it was a new song written by Otis Blackwell, whom Elvis had long admired as a rhythm and blues artist. It took just a few bars to convince Presley that it was a perfect song for him, and he decided to cut it right away. Presley learned the song within minutes—he had an inherent musical sense—and in short order a great master was put on tape. It is not often that the title of a song will create a whole new expression in Americana. "All Shook Up" did exactly that. Youngsters and adults alike have made the phrase a common part of everyday usage. The background to the song itself is a rather interesting one. Since the huge success of "Don't Be Cruel", Elvis had been anxious to record another song from the pen of Otis Blackwell. Eventually, Blackwell came around with "All Shook Up" (first recorded by David Hill on Aladdin). Presley was not completely satisfied with the song, and with Blackwell's consent re-wrote part of the lyrics. Thus, as co-writer as well as artist, Presley produced his ninth consecutive gold record, his first in the year 1957.

During an appearance on Late Night with David Letterman, Blackwell said he never met Presley in person. When he was having a contract dispute with his publishing company, he also wrote under the white-sounding pen name John Davenport. Blackwell composed more than a thousand songs, garnering worldwide sales of close to 200 million records. Presley's manager, Colonel Tom Parker, asked Blackwell to appear in the Presley movie Girls! Girls! Girls!, for which he had written "Return to Sender", but a superstition about meeting Presley kept him from accepting.

In 1956, Blackwell gave "Don't Be Cruel" to friend Frankie Valli's group, The Four Lovers, but as they were recording it he asked to take it back and in turn gave it to the up-and-coming Presley. In exchange for this song, he gave them "You're the Apple of My Eye", which became a chart hit for the Four Lovers (Billboard number 64).

As the tide of rock and roll receded, Blackwell recorded R&B songs for numerous labels, including Atlantic, MGM and Epic. In later years, he was in semi-retirement, making only occasional live appearances.

In the 1980s, Blackwell toured and recorded with the Smithereens as his backing band for both live shows and studio recordings. The partnership produced two self-funded albums, Let's Talk About Us and From the Beginning, which were released independently on Blackwell's ROC-CO imprint.

In 1991, Blackwell was paralyzed by a stroke. Three years later, Shanachie released the album Brace Yourself! A Tribute to Otis Blackwell, containing 15 songs written by Blackwell and recorded by musicians including Kris Kristofferson ("All Shook Up"), Blondie's Debbie Harry ("Don't Be Cruel"), the Smithereens ("Let's Talk About Us"), Graham Parker ("Paralyzed"), and Ronnie Spector ("Brace Yourself").

Blackwell died of a heart attack in 2002 in Nashville, Tennessee, and was interred in Woodlawn Memorial Park.

== Awards and recognition ==
Otis Blackwell was inducted into the Nashville Songwriters Hall of Fame in 1986 and in 1991 into the National Academy of Popular Music's Songwriters Hall of Fame. Blackwell's crowning moment came in the late 1980s when the Black Rock Coalition, a prominent organization of black rock musicians, led by Vernon Reid, the lead guitarist of the band, Living Colour, held a tribute for him at the Prospect Park Bandshell in his native Brooklyn. Many prominent musicians and singers took part including Blackwell himself, who performed an assortment of his best songs, including "One Broken Heart for Sale", "Back Trail", "Don't Be Cruel" and "Daddy Rolling Stone".

Blackwell was named one of the 2010 recipients of Ahmet Ertegun Award in the Rock and Roll Hall of Fame. This category encompasses those who primarily work behind the scenes in the music industry.

In 2022, Blackwell was inducted into the Blues Hall of Fame.

== Legacy ==
Blackwell is considered one of the greatest R&B songwriters of all time. His songwriting style is as uniquely identifiable as that of Leiber and Stoller, Chuck Berry, or Willie Dixon and helped redefine popular music in America in the 1950s. This is true even though he often collaborated with such partners as Winfield Scott, Eddie Cooley, and Jack Hammer. Blackwell was one of the most important innovators who helped invent the musical vocabulary of rock and roll at its very beginning. His works have been recorded by a host of major artists, including Elvis Presley, Jerry Lee Lewis, Ray Charles, Otis Redding, James Brown, The Who, Johnny Thunders, Billy Joel, James Taylor, Dolly Parton, Conway Twitty, the Judds, Carl Perkins, Lonnie Lee, and Peggy Lee, among numerous others. At other times in his career, Blackwell was also successful as a record producer, having helped turn out hits for artists as diverse as Connie Francis, Mahalia Jackson, and Sal Mineo.

== Songs ==
Songs composed by Blackwell, with the performers who made them famous, include the following:

- "All Shook Up" (Elvis Presley)
- "Breathless" (Jerry Lee Lewis, X)
- "Daddy Rolling Stone" (Derek Martin, The Who, Willy DeVille, The Blasters)
- "Don't Be Cruel" (Elvis Presley); inducted into the Grammy Hall of Fame in 2002
- "Fever" as "John Davenport" with Eddie Cooley (Peggy Lee, inducted into the Grammy Hall of Fame in 1998; Little Willie John, The McCoys, Elvis Presley, La Lupe (Spanish version), Bob Dylan, Madonna, Over the Rhine, and numerous other performers).
- "Great Balls of Fire" (Jerry Lee Lewis, inducted into the Grammy Hall of Fame in 1998)
- "Handy Man" (Jimmy Jones, Del Shannon, James Taylor)
- "Hey Little Girl" (Dee Clark)
- "Let's Talk About Us" (Jerry Lee Lewis)
- "Nine Times Out of Ten" with Waldense Hall (Cliff Richard, Ral Donner)
- "One Broken Heart for Sale" (Elvis Presley)
- "Paralyzed" (Elvis Presley)
- "Return to Sender" (Elvis Presley)

== Selected discography ==
Year	Title	Genre	Label
1955	Otis Blackwell 1953–55	Blues, rock & roll, R&B	Flyright
1978	These Are My Songs	Blues, rock & roll, R&B	Inner City
2005	The Chronological Otis Blackwell 1952–1954	Blues, rock & roll, R&B	Classics (Blues & Rhythm series)
2020	I Sing 'Em and I Write 'Em	Blues, rock & roll, R&B	Jasmine

== Sources and further reading ==
- Wilmer, Val. "Rock and Roll Genius" [interview with Otis Blackwell]. Melody Maker. February 5, 1977, Vol. 52: pp. 8, 44.
- Wilmer, Val. "'I'm Happy as All Hell that the Man Took My Songs'" [interview with Otis Blackwell]. Time Out. March 6–12, 1981, pp. 12–13
