= Sweet Baby James =

Studio album by James Taylor
- Released: February 1, 1970
- Recorded: December 1969
- Studio: Sunset Sound, Los Angeles
- Genre: Folk rock
- Length: 31:51
- Label: Warner Bros.
- Producer: Peter Asher

James Taylor chronology
James Taylor (1968)	Sweet Baby James (1970)	1967 (1971)

Singles from Sweet Baby James
- 1. "Sweet Baby James" Released: April 1970; 2. "Fire and Rain" Released: August 30, 1970; 3. "Country Road" Released: December 27, 1970

Sweet Baby James is the second studio album by American singer-songwriter James Taylor, released on February 1, 1970, by Warner Bros. Records. It reached number three on the Billboard Top LPs & Tape chart, and includes two of Taylor's earliest successful singles: "Fire and Rain" and "Country Road", which reached number three and number thirty-seven on the Billboard Hot 100, respectively. This success made Taylor one of the most prominent figures in the emerging singer-songwriter movement.

At the 13th Annual Grammy Awards, Sweet Baby James was nominated for Album of the Year. It was listed at number 104 on Rolling Stone's list "The 500 Greatest Albums of All Time", and, in 2000, it was voted number 228 in Colin Larkin's All Time Top 1000 Albums. In 2002, the album was inducted into the Grammy Hall of Fame.

== Background ==
Produced by Peter Asher, Sweet Baby James was recorded at Sunset Sound in Los Angeles, California, between December 8 and 17, 1969, at a cost of only $7,600 (US$66,724 in 2025 dollars) out of a budget of $20,000. Taylor was "essentially homeless" at the time the album was recorded, either staying in Asher's home or sleeping on a couch at the house of guitarist Danny Kortchmar, or anyone else who would have him.

The song "Suite for 20 G" was so named because Taylor was promised $20,000 (US$175,590 in 2025 dollars) once the album was delivered. With one more song needed, he strung together three unfinished songs into a "suite" to complete the album.

The album produced two charting singles: "Fire and Rain" (b/w "Anywhere Like Heaven"), which peaked at number three on the Billboard Hot 100 on October 31, 1970, and "Country Road" (b/w "Sunny Skies"), which peaked at number 37 on March 20, 1971. An additional single, "Sweet Baby James" (b/w "Suite for 20 G"), did not chart.

== Critical reception ==
Professional ratings
Review scores
Source	Rating
AllMusic	5/5 stars
Christgau's Record Guide	B−
MusicHound Rock	4/5
Rolling Stone Album Guide	5/5 stars
The Village Voice	C+
Encyclopedia of Popular Music	5/5 stars

Reviewing for Rolling Stone in 1970, Gary von Tersch observed in the music "echoes of the Band, the Byrds, country Dylan and folksified Dion", which Taylor manages to negotiate into a "very listenable record that is all his own". Village Voice critic Robert Christgau was harsher in his appraisal of the album, saying that "Taylor's vehement following bewilders me; as near as I can discern, he is just another poetizing simp. Even the production is conventional. For true believers only." In a retrospective review, AllMusic's William Ruhlmann was more receptive to "Taylor's sense of wounded hopelessness", believing it reflected "the pessimism and desperation of the 1960s hangover that was the early '70s" and "struck a chord with music fans, especially because of its attractive mixture of folk, country, gospel, and blues elements, all of them carefully understated and distanced."

== Accolades ==
- In 2001, the TV network VH1 named Sweet Baby James the 77th greatest album of all time.
- In 2003, the album was ranked number 104 on Rolling Stone magazine's list "The 500 Greatest Albums of All Time", maintaining the position in the 2012 update to the list, and dropping to number 182 in the 2020 update.

== Track listing ==
All songs by James Taylor unless otherwise noted.

Side one

1. "Sweet Baby James" – 2:54
2. "Lo and Behold" – 2:37
3. "Sunny Skies" – 2:21
4. "Steamroller" – 2:57
5. "Country Road" – 3:22
6. "Oh, Susannah" (Stephen Foster) – 1:58

Side two

1. "Fire and Rain" – 3:20
2. "Blossom" – 2:14
3. "Anywhere Like Heaven" – 3:23
4. "Oh Baby, Don't You Loose Your Lip on Me" – 1:46
5. "Suite for 20 G" – 4:41

== Personnel ==
Musicians

- James Taylor – vocals, guitar
- Danny Kortchmar – guitar
- Red Rhodes – steel guitar
- John London – bass guitar (except “Country Road”, “Fire and Rain”, and “Blossom”)
- Randy Meisner – bass guitar on "Country Road" and "Blossom"
- Bobby West – double bass on "Fire and Rain"
- Carole King – backing vocals, piano
- Russ Kunkel – drums
- Chris Darrow – fiddle, violin

The horn players are uncredited.

Technical

- Jack Bielan – brass arrangements
- Peter Asher – producer
- Bill Lazerus – engineer
- Darrell Johnson – mastering
- Ed Thrasher – art direction
- Henry Diltz – photography

== Charts ==
=== Weekly charts ===
Chart (1970–1971)	Peak position
Australian Albums (Kent Music Report)	7
Canadian RPM Albums Chart	3
UK Albums Chart	6
US Billboard Top LPs & Tape	3

=== Year-end charts ===
Chart (1970)	Position
US Billboard Pop Albums	15
Chart (1971)	Position
US Billboard Pop Albums	7

== Certifications ==
Region	Certification	Certified units/sales
United Kingdom (BPI)	Silver	60,000^{*}
United States (RIAA)	3× Platinum	3,000,000^{^}
^{*} Sales figures based on certification alone.^{^} Shipments figures based on certification alone.
