= Peter Asher =

English musician and producer (born 1944)

Peter Asher CBE
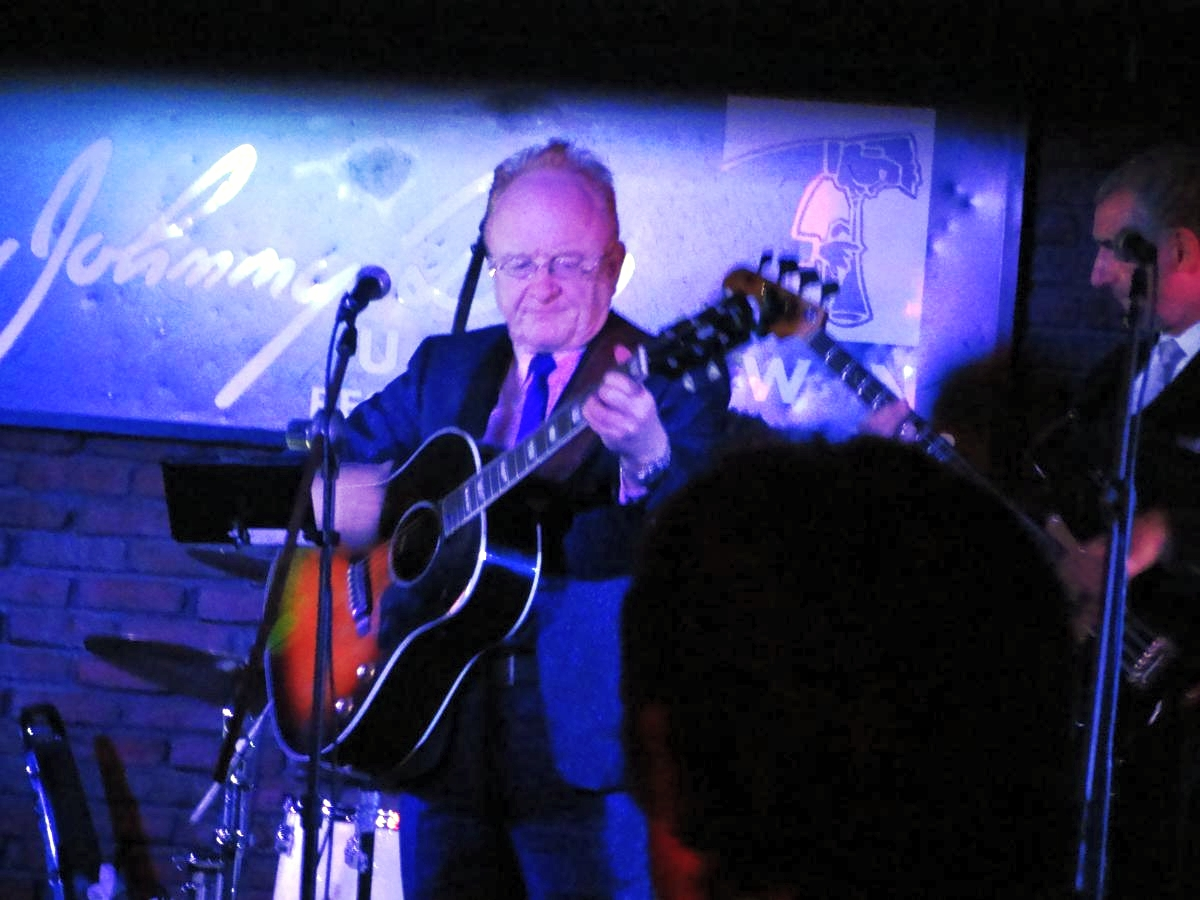
- Asher in 2012

Background information
- Born: 22 June 1944 (age 82); Willesden, Middlesex, England
- Genres: Traditional pop, pop
- Occupations: Musician, record producer, actor
- Instruments: Vocals, guitar
- Years active: 1952–present
- Labels: Capitol, Apple, Warner Bros., Columbia
- Formerly of: Peter and Gordon

Peter Asher (born 22 June 1944) is an English guitarist, singer, manager and record producer. He came to prominence in the 1960s as a member of the pop music vocal duo Peter and Gordon before going on to a successful career as a manager and record producer, helping to foster the recording careers of James Taylor and Linda Ronstadt among others.

As of 2018, he tours alongside Jeremy Clyde in Peter and Jeremy, who perform hits from both of their catalogues. In 2019, Asher published a book The Beatles from A to Zed about his personal reminiscences about the band.

The 2025 documentary film Peter Asher: Everywhere Man covers his life and career.

== Early life ==
Asher was born at the Central Middlesex Hospital to Richard and Margaret Asher, née Eliot. His father was a consultant in blood and mental diseases at the Central Middlesex Hospital as well as being a broadcaster and the author of notable medical articles. Asher's mother was a professor at the Guildhall School of Music and Drama. One of her pupils there was George Martin. Asher is the brother of Clare Asher, a radio actress and school inspector, and Jane Asher, an English actress and author.

When he was eight years old he began working as a child actor and appeared in the film The Planter's Wife and the stage play Isn't Life Wonderful. At the age of nine Asher played the central juvenile part in the 1953 film version of Isn't Life Wonderful! alongside stars Cecil Parker and Donald Wolfit. In 1955 he played the youngest brother, Johnny, in Escapade, based on Roger MacDougall's play. The film starred John Mills and Alastair Sim. He also appeared in one episode of the ITV series The Adventures of Robin Hood alongside his sister Jane.

In 1956 Asher appeared as a 12-year-old in The Talking Head, one of the short films in the series of Colonel March of Scotland Yard, starring Boris Karloff.

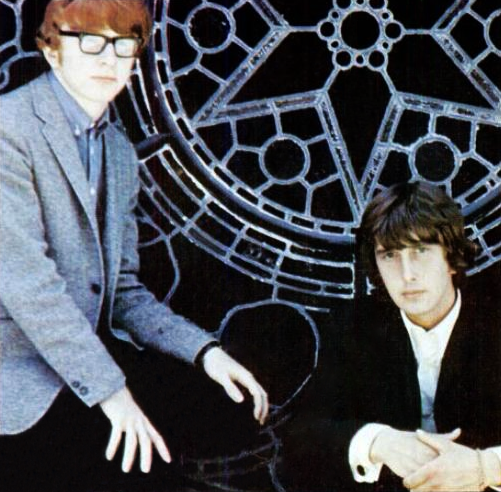
Asher (left) with Gordon Waller (right) in 1966

While attending the independent Westminster School as a day boy he met fellow pupil Gordon Waller (1945–2009) and they began playing and singing together as a duo in cafes.

== Career ==
In 1962 Asher and Waller began working formally as Peter and Gordon. Their first (and biggest) hit was the 1964 Lennon/McCartney song "A World Without Love". Asher's sister Jane was, in the mid-1960s, the girlfriend of Paul McCartney. Through this connection Asher and Waller were given three unrecorded Lennon/McCartney songs to perform.

Asher later read philosophy at King's College London. In 1965 he was best man when singer Marianne Faithfull married John Dunbar in Cambridge.

After Peter and Gordon disbanded in 1968, Asher took charge of the A&R department at the Beatles' Apple Records label, where he signed a then-unknown James Taylor and agreed to produce the singer-songwriter's debut solo album. The album was not a success but Asher was so convinced that Taylor held great potential that he resigned his post at Apple to move to the United States and work as Taylor's manager. Asher produced Paul Jones' rendition of the Bee Gees' And the Sun Will Shine which was released as a single (only in the UK). He also produced a number of Taylor's recordings from 1970 to 1985, including Sweet Baby James, Mud Slide Slim and the Blue Horizon, JT and Flag.

=== 1970s–1980s ===
In the early 1970s Asher also managed the country-rock band Country, which recorded for Atlantic Records through its subsidiary Clean Records. Country featured Michael Fondiler and Tom Snow, who has since become a songwriter. For a time, Asher also managed James Taylor's sister Kate Taylor. When she decided to leave the business, she recommended him to Linda Ronstadt at which point Asher became Ronstadt's manager. Asher achieved his greatest success producing a long string of multi-platinum albums for James Taylor, including Sweet Baby James, JT and Flag, and for Linda Ronstadt, including Heart Like a Wheel; Simple Dreams; Living in the USA; What's New; Canciones De Mi Padre; and Cry Like a Rainstorm, Howl Like the Wind.

By producing records for Ronstadt, JD Souther, Andrew Gold and Bonnie Raitt, Peter Asher played a significant role in shaping the Californian rock sound during the 1970s. He was also one of the original partners in the Roxy Theatre in West Hollywood, which he opened on 23 September 1973 with Elmer Valentine, Lou Adler, and original partners David Geffen and Elliot Roberts.

In 1976, Asher and Waller performed for the annual New York "Beatlefest" and played a few other dates. In the 1980s, Asher also worked on hit albums for artists as diverse as Cher and 10,000 Maniacs.

=== 1990–2010 ===
In February 1995, Asher was named Senior Vice-President of Sony Music Entertainment. At the beginning of 2002, Asher left Sony and returned full-time to the management of artists' careers as co-President of Sanctuary Artist Management. In January 2005 he was named President, the position he held until September 2006, when he resigned. In 2007 Asher joined forces with his friend Simon Renshaw (who manages the Dixie Chicks) at the company Simon founded, Strategic Artist Management. Strategic has grown into a dominant force in the entertainment industry, now managing artists in many fields of endeavour beyond just music – one of Asher's clients is Pamela Anderson. Asher also reunited with James Taylor as the producer of the Live at the Troubadour reunion album recorded in 2007, with Carole King and Taylor's original band.

During 2005 and 2006, Peter and Gordon reformed for occasional concerts. However, Waller died in 2009 and in its obituary, The Times observed that "Waller was thought more handsome than the slightly nerdish looking Asher".

Asher was quoted as saying actor Mike Myers patterned his Austin Powers character after Asher's appearance, although Elizabeth Hurley, who co-starred in Austin Powers, said the original model included broadcaster Simon Dee.

=== Current ===
In 2011, Asher was the executive producer of the Listen to Me: Buddy Holly compilation album and also music supervisor, producer, and co-host of the Buddy Holly: Listen to Me; The Ultimate Buddy Party PBS Pledge Special. Performed and filmed in front of a live audience the Buddy Holly tribute concert aired as PBS Pledge Special in December 2011 and May and June 2012. The Special received the highest 2012 Silver Telly Award in the Category of TV Programs, Segments, or Promotional Pieces.

Asher was appointed Commander of the Order of the British Empire (CBE) in the 2015 New Year Honours for services to the British music industry.

In May 2017, Asher debuted a weekly, hour-long series on the Sirius XM Radio station for The Beatles called "From Me To You". He also announced with commentary the Top 100 Beatles countdown "All Together Now" on The Beatles Channel that first aired on Sirius XM Radio on the Labor Day Weekend in 2017, and is frequently replayed.

Since 2016, Peter Asher has been playing shows, including one at the Edmonton Folk Music Festival, as part of a duo with Albert Lee that showcases songs from both their careers. He currently resides in Venice, California.

In 2018, Asher began performing with Jeremy Clyde of Chad & Jeremy fame.

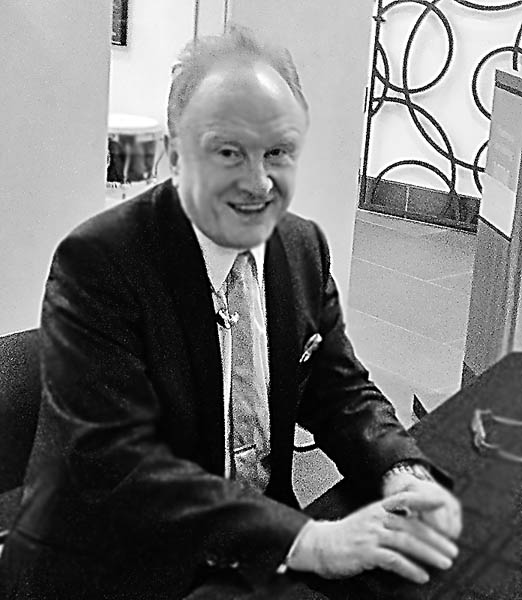
Phoenix, 6 October 2012

== Personal life ==
Asher had a short-lived relationship with singer Millie Small, which she later described as platonic. Also known as Millie, she was best known for her hit single, My Boy Lollipop, issued by record label Island Records. She died in London in 2020.

Asher and his wife, Wendy Worth, are the parents of musician, director and producer Victoria Asher.

== Awards and recognition ==
=== Grammy Awards ===
- 1977 – Producer of The Year, Non-Classical (Simple Dreams, JT)
- 1989 – Producer of the Year, Non-Classical (Cry Like a Rainstorm, Howl Like the Wind)
- 2002 – Best Spoken Comedy Album (Live 2002 (Robin Williams))

=== CBE ===
- 2015 – appointed Commander of the British Empire

== Discography ==
=== As performer ===
All releases by Peter and Gordon unless noted.

Year	Album
1964	In Touch With...
1964	Peter and Gordon
1964	World Without Love
1965	Hurtin' 'n' Lovin'
1965	I Don't Want to See You Again
1965	I Go To Pieces
1965	True Love Ways
1966	Best of Peter and Gordon
1966	Peter and Gordon Sing and Play the Hits of Nashville
1966	Somewhere
1966	Woman
1967	In London for Tea
1967	Knight in Rusty Armour
1967	Lady Godiva
1967	Hot Cold and Custard
1972	Gordon (Gordon Waller solo album)
1983	Best of Peter and Gordon
1983	Hits of Peter and Gordon
1991	Best of Peter and Gordon
2001	Ultimate Peter and Gordon
2003	Definitive Collection: Knights in Rusty Armour

=== As producer ===
Year	Album	Artist
1968	James Taylor	James Taylor
1969	Barbara Keith	Barbara Keith
1970	Jo Mama	Jo Mama
1970	Sweet Baby James	James Taylor
1970	Bad Girl Songs	Tony Kosinec
1971	Mud Slide Slim and the Blue Horizon	James Taylor
1971	Sister Kate	Kate Taylor
1971	Tony Joe White	Tony Joe White
1972	One Man Dog	James Taylor
1973	Don't Cry Now	Linda Ronstadt
1974	Heart Like a Wheel	Linda Ronstadt
1975	Prisoner in Disguise	Linda Ronstadt
1975	Black Rose	JD Souther
1976	Hasten Down the Wind	Linda Ronstadt
1976	Love Songs	David Sanborn
1976	What's Wrong with This Picture?	Andrew Gold
1977	JT	James Taylor
1977	Simple Dreams	Linda Ronstadt
1978	Living in the USA	Linda Ronstadt
1979	Flag	James Taylor
1979	The Glow	Bonnie Raitt
1980	Mad Love	Linda Ronstadt
1981	Dad Loves His Work	James Taylor
1982	Get Closer	Linda Ronstadt
1983	Reelin' in the Years, Vol. 1	various artists
1983	What's New	Linda Ronstadt
1984	Lush Life	Linda Ronstadt
1984	Moonlighting	(Original TV soundtrack)
1985	That's Why I'm Here	James Taylor
1986	An American Tail	(Original soundtrack)
1986	For Sentimental Reasons	Linda Ronstadt
1987	Canciones De Mi Padre	Linda Ronstadt
1987	Cher	Cher
1987	In My Tribe	10,000 Maniacs
1987	Storytellers: Singers and Songwriters	various artists
1988	The Land Before Time	(Original soundtrack)
1989	Blind Man's Zoo	10,000 Maniacs
1989	Cry Like a Rainstorm, Howl Like the Wind	Linda Ronstadt
1989	Heart of Stone	Cher
1989	You Happy Puppet	10,000 Maniacs
1990	Mermaids	(Original soundtrack)
1991	Force Behind the Power	Diana Ross
1991	Live in Rio	James Taylor
1991	Love Hurts	Cher
1991	Lovescape	Neil Diamond
1991	Mambo Kings	(Original soundtrack)
1991	Swept	Julia Fordham
1991	Williams Brothers	The Williams Brothers
1992	American Standard	Mary's Danish
1992	Back to Basics	Olivia Newton-John
1992	Christmas Album	Neil Diamond
1992	Olivia	Olivia Newton-John
1992	Time Takes Time	Ringo Starr
1993	Made in America	(Original soundtrack)
1993	Robin Zander	Robin Zander
1993	Up on the Roof: Songs from the Brill Building	Neil Diamond
1994	Christmas Album, Vol. 2	Neil Diamond
1994	Randy Newman's Faust: Words and Music	various artists
1995	Don't Ask	Tina Arena
1995	EP Collection	Peter and Gordon
1995	Faust	Randy Newman
1996	It Takes Two	various artists
1996	One Fine Day	(Original soundtrack)
1996	Show Me Heaven	Tina Arena
1996	Powerbill	The Semantics
1997	Most Beautiful Soul Album on Earth	various artists
1997	Superstar Christmas	various artists
1997	Under These Rocks and Stones	Chantal Kreviazuk
1998	Armageddon	(Original soundtrack)
1998	As I Came of Age	Sarah Brightman
1998	December	Kenny Loggins
1998	Motown 40 Forever	various artists
1999	All Time Greatest Movie Songs	various artists
1999	Best Party Megamix in the World Ever	various artists
1999	Collection	Julia Fordham
1999	Runaway Bride	(Original soundtrack)
1999	When the Going Gets Tough	Boyzone
2000	Gift of Love	Diana Ross
2000	More Songs from Pooh Corner	Kenny Loggins
2000	Tigger Movie: Songs and Story	various artists
2001	Everything I Am	Anna Vissi
2001	Motown Anthology	Diana Ross
2001	Three Chord Opera	Neil Diamond
2001	Ultimate Peter and Gordon	Peter and Gordon
2002	Capitol Records 1942–2002	various artists
2002	Everybody's Got a Story	Amanda Marshall
2002	Freedom: A History of Us	(Original soundtrack)
2002	Live 2002	Robin Williams
2002	Providence	(Original TV soundtrack)
2002	Sweet Is the Melody	Aselin Debison
2003	Best of the Definitive American Songbook, Vol. 2: I-Z	various artists
2003	Cafeteria: Hear	various artists
2003	Earth Rider – The Essential John Stewart 1964–1979	John Stewart
2003	Singers and Songwriters Christmas Songs	various artists
2004	California	Wilson Phillips
2004	Campfire Songs: The Popular, Obscure and Unknown Recordings	10,000 Maniacs
2004	De-Lovely	(Original soundtrack)
2004	Intermission	Amanda Marshall
2004	Sky Captain and the World of Tomorrow	(Original soundtrack)
2004	Taking a Chance on Love	Jane Monheit
2005	Live at Earls Court	Morrissey
2005	Goodies, Vol. 1	various artists
2005	Souvenirs	Tina Arena
2006	You're Only Lonely	Raul Malo
2006	I Love You	Diana Ross
2007	Siren	Sasha and Shawna
2010	Live at the Troubadour	Carole King and James Taylor
2011	Buddy Holly: Listen to Me; The Ultimate Buddy Party	Various Artists – Producer and Host
2013	Love Has Come for You	Steve Martin and Edie Brickell
2013	When Will You Come Home (EP)	The Webb Sisters
2017	The Long Awaited Album	Steve Martin and The Steep Canyon Rangers
2023	The Deep End	Susanna Hoffs
2025	The Secret of Life: Partners, Volume Two	Barbra Streisand

=== As executive producer ===
Year	Album	Artist
1989	Harry's Cafe De Wheels	Peter Blakeley
1999	Timbre	Sophie B. Hawkins
2011	Listen to Me: Buddy Holly	Various Artists
