= One Man Parade =

- Single label (version backed with "Nobody But You")

Single by James Taylor

from the album One Man Dog
- A-side: "One Morning in May" (Europe)
- B-side: "Hymn" or "Nobody But You" (US)
- Released: February 1973
- Genre: Folk rock
- Length: 3:10
- Label: Warner Bros.
- Songwriter: James Taylor
- Producer: Peter Asher

James Taylor singles chronology
"Don't Let Me Be Lonely Tonight" (1972)	"One Man Parade" (1973)	"Hymn" (1973)

"One Man Parade" is a song written by James Taylor that was first released as the first track on his 1972 album One Man Dog. It was released as the second single from the album, following the top 20 hit "Don't Let Me Be Lonely Tonight", after receiving significant airplay as an album track. The single was issued twice with two different B-sides, "Hymn" and "Nobody But You." It did not achieve the same chart success as "Don't Let Me Be Lonely Tonight," peaking at No. 67 on the Billboard Hot 100. It also charted on the Adult Contemporary chart in Canada, reaching No. 55. In some regions, such as in Europe, it was released as the B-side of the single release of "One Morning in May."

== Lyrics and music ==
Taylor said he had written "One Man Parade" during the year preceding the album release and he had begun playing it live in concert as early as the fall of 1971. Like "Don't Let Me Be Lonely Tonight," "One Man Parade" was recorded on a portable recording console at Taylor's home with his new bride Carly Simon in Martha's Vineyard, Massachusetts. Simon, Carole King and Abigale Haness provided harmony vocals, as do Taylor's siblings Alex, Kate and Hugh. Musicologist James Perone hears several Latin music elements in the song, including the instrumentation including congas, güiro and timbales. Russ Kunkel plays the congas on the song, in a performance Taylor biographer Mark Robowsky describes as "trippy." Perone also finds Latin dance music influences in the way the song uses harmonic and bass ostinato, and finds the coda section to be similar to a montuno section of certain Latin music pieces that use a canto-montuno structure.

"One Man Parade" was originally intended to be the title track of the album, but Taylor changed the album title "for no particular reason" to One Man Dog, in reference to his shepherd dog who is mentioned in the song. To Robowsky, "One Man Parade" provides the theme for the album, calling it "a wistful desire to waste time on the simplest pleasures, walking a dog, pouring rain, checking out an occasional garbage can." Berwyn Life critic Steve Sparacio similarly stated that the song "sets the tone for the individualist theme of the LP."

Although Robowsky calls the song "upbeat" and Taylor's "most carefree yet: he notes that Taylor undercuts that mood with the line "I'm right good at holding on, holding on, holding on." Perone also notes that the lyrics are more "upbeat" than most Taylor songs of this era, with the singer announcing his readiness to "step out on the town." Donald Langis of L'Evangeline praised the word play of the lines "All I want is a little dog to be walking at my right hand / talking 'bout a one man dog / Nobody's friend but mine." Langis interpreted the dog as a metaphor for the type of friend Taylor is seeking.

== Critical reception ==
Billboard rated "One Man Parade" as one of Taylor's best songs ever, saying that it is "full of melodic surprises" and "lyrical weirdness." It also noted that although the song is "rollicking" it fits within Taylor's brand of gentle pop music. Cash Box said that the "soft outing creates quite a mood that [radio] programmers will love," predicting that it would make the Top 10. Record World said that the "Following up his recent 'Don't Let Me Be Lonely Tonight' hit, Mr. Mellow comes up with another easy-going tune [that] should add one more to his parade of hits."

Rolling Stone critic Jon Landau praised how the song "starts right in and never lets up," and also praises Taylor's vocal performance for sounding like he was "standing while singing for the very first time. Langis believed it had potential to be a hit. Calgary Herald critic Jim Rennie said that although many of the songs on One Man Dog are "bits and pieces", "One Man Parade" is a "substantial enough composition" that has "the same soft, fluid, country flavor that almost all of Taylor's songs contain." Several reviewers praised Taylor's live performances of the song in the early 1970s.

"One Man Parade" was included on the 2003 compilation album Best of James Taylor.

== Personnel ==
- James Taylor – lead and backing vocals, acoustic guitar, harmonica
- Danny Kortchmar – electric guitar, timbales
- Russ Kunkel – congas
- Peter Asher – guiro
- Abigale Haness – backing vocals
- Carole King – backing vocals
- Carly Simon – backing vocals
- Alex Taylor – backing vocals
- Hugh Taylor – backing vocals
- Kate Taylor – backing vocals

== Charts ==
Chart (1973)	Peak position
Canada Adult Contemporary (RPM)	55
US Billboard Hot 100	67
