= Kate Taylor (album) =

Studio album by Kate Taylor
- Released: May 4, 1978
- Genre: Rock
- Label: Columbia
- Producer: James Taylor

Kate Taylor chronology
Sister Kate (1971)	Kate Taylor (1978)	It's in There (1979)

Kate Taylor is the second studio album by singer Kate Taylor, released May 4, 1978. The album included Taylor's sole chart single: her version of "It's in His Kiss (The Shoop Shoop Song)", recorded in August 1977 to peak at number 49 that autumn; the Kate Taylor album also introduced the singer's remakes of "A Fool in Love", "It's Growin'" and "Stubborn Kind of Woman" (originally "Stubborn Kind of Fellow"); the track "It's Growin'" was issued as a single in July 1978. The album's other tracks included the debut versions of two James Taylor compositions: "Happy Birthday Sweet Darling" and "Slow and Steady", and also Kate Taylor's rendition of "Rodeo", composed by her brother Livingston Taylor for his 1973 album Over the Rainbow. Kate Taylor also included the B-side of "It's in His Kiss": the self-penned "Jason & Ida", and introduced "Tiah's Cove" — written by Kate Taylor's husband Charlie Witham – and also the Walter Robinson composition "Harriet Tubman": the latter is described by James Taylor biographer Timothy White as "a searing latterday spiritual" which is "the highpoint of Kate's exceptional eleven song set."

== Track listing ==
1. "A Fool in Love" — (Ike Turner)
2. "Smuggler's Song" — (Clay Jackson, Ethan Singer)
3. "Harriet Tubman" — (Walter Robinson)
4. "Stubborn Kind of Woman" — (Marvin Gaye, William "Mickey" Stevenson, George Gordy)
5. "Happy Birthday Sweet Darling" — (James Taylor)
6. "It's in His Kiss" — (Rudy Clark)
7. "Slow and Steady" — (James Taylor, Zach Wiesner)
8. "It's Growin'" — (Warren "Pete" Moore, Smokey Robinson)
9. "Tiah's Cove" — (Charlie Witham)
10. "Rodeo" — (Livingston Taylor)
11. "Jason & Ida" — (Duane Giesemann, Kate Taylor)

== Personnel ==
- Kate Taylor – vocals
- Kenny Ascher, Kenneth Bichel, Richard Tee – piano
- Rubens Bassini, Errol "Crusher" Bennett, Ralph MacDonald – percussion
- Randy Brecker – trumpet, tenor saxophone
- Don Brooks – harmonica
- Ron Carter, Will Lee, Tony Levin – bass guitar
- Ronnie Cuber – baritone saxophone
- Jessy Dixon – backing vocals
- Cornell Dupree, Onnie McIntyre, Jeff Mironov – guitar
- Steve Ferrone, Steve Gadd, Gary Mure – drums
- Don Grolnick – organ, piano
- John Hall – backing vocals
- Elsa Harris – backing vocals
- Bingo Hodges – backing vocals
- Arif Mardin – strings, arranger
- Lou Marini, David Tofani – tenor saxophone
- Alan Rubin – trumpet
- David Sanborn – alto saxophone
- Carly Simon – backing vocals
- David Spinozza – guitar, horn
- Alex Taylor – backing vocals
- David Taylor – trombone
- James Taylor – guitar, arranger, horn, backing vocals
