= Dinnertime =

Studio album by Alex Taylor
- Released: February 1972
- Studios: Muscle Shoals Sound Studio, Muscle Shoals, Alabama
- Genre: Southern rock
- Length: 39:05
- Label: Capricorn
- Producer: Johnny Sandlin

Alex Taylor chronology
With Friends and Neighbors (1971)	Dinnertime (1972)	Third for Music (1974)

Professional ratings
Review scores
Source	Rating
Allmusic	4/5 stars

Dinnertime is the second album by Alex Taylor, brother of James, Livingston, Hugh, and Kate Taylor. The album was recorded at Muscle Shoals Sound Studio. The standout tracks are "Change Your Sexy Ways", Randy Newman's "Lets Burn Down the Cornfield", Scott Boyer's "Comin' Back to You", and Stephen Stills' "Four Days Gone".

== Track listing ==
1. "Change Your Sexy Ways" (Alex Taylor, Chuck Leavell, Jimmy Nalls) - 7:07
2. "Let's Burn Down the Cornfield" (Randy Newman) - 4:25
3. "Comin' Back to You" (Scott Boyer) - 4:15
4. "Four Days Gone" (Stephen Stills) - 3:56
5. "Payday" (Jesse Winchester) - 4:53
6. "Who's Been Talking?" (Howlin' Wolf) - 4:45
7. "Who Will the Next Fool Be?" (Charlie Rich) - 4:50
8. "From a Buick Six" (Bob Dylan) - 4:54

== Personnel ==
- Alex Taylor - vocals
- Scott Boyer - guitar, backing vocals
- Chuck Leavell - piano, keyboards, vibraphone
- Paul Hornsby - organ, keyboards
- Johnny Sandlin - bass, Moog synthesizer
- Wayne Perkins - bass, guitar, slide guitar
- John Hughey - steel guitar
- Jimmy Nalls - guitar
- Charlie Hayward - bass
- Jaimoe - percussion, conga, timbales
- Bill Stewart - drums
- Roger Hawkins - percussion, conga, tambourine
- Lou Mullenix - percussion, timbales
- Earl Sims - percussion
- Charles Chalmers - backing vocals
- Sandra Chalmers - backing vocals
- Ginger Holladay - backing vocals
- Mary Holladay - backing vocals
- Donna Rhodes - backing vocals
- Sandra Rhodes - backing vocals
- Temple Riser - backing vocals
- Steve Smith - backing vocals

== Production ==
- Producer: Johnny Sandlin
- Recording Engineer: Steve Smith, Johnny Sandlin
- Remixing: Johnny Sandlin, Jeff Willens, Richard Rosebrough, Danny Tuberville
- Photography: Barry Feinstein, Tom Wilkes
- Executive Supervisor: Phil Walden
