= It's in There =

Studio album by Kate Taylor
- Released: 1979
- Genre: Rock
- Label: CBS
- Producer: Barry Beckett

Kate Taylor chronology
Kate Taylor (1978)	It's in There (1979)	Beautiful Road (2003)

It's in There… And It's Got To Come Out! is the third album by the American singer-songwriter Kate Taylor, released in 1979.

It's in There failed to reach its public. After this release, Taylor took a break from the music industry for the next two decades, during which time she appeared sporadically as a performer and back-up singer for various other artists, not releasing another album herself until 2003.

== Track listing ==
1. "I Got the Will" — (Otis Redding)
2. "Kite Woman" — (JD Souther)
3. "Ain't No Way to Forget You" — (W.C. Quillen, Grady L. Smith)
4. "Loving You Was Easier" — (Kris Kristofferson)
5. "Ain't Too Proud to Beg" — (Edward Holland, Jr., Norman Whitfield)
6. "It's the Same Old Song" — (Holland-Dozier-Holland)
7. "Can't Hurry Love" — (Holland-Dozier-Holland)
8. "I'm a Hog for You Baby" — (Jerry Leiber, Mike Stoller)
9. "Champagne and Wine" — (Roy Johnson, Otis Redding, Allan Walden)
10. "Ain't No Love in the Heart of the City" — (Michael Price, Dan Walsh)

== Personnel ==
- Kate Taylor – vocals
- Barry Beckett – piano
- Larry Byrom – acoustic guitar, electric guitar
- Pete Carr – electric guitar
- Gregg Hamm – engineer
- Roger Hawkins – drums
- David Hood – bass guitar
- Jimmy Johnson – electric guitar
- Randy McCormick – organ
- Charlie McCoy – harmonica
- Weldon Myrick – steel guitar
- Cindy Richardson – backing vocals
- Tom Roady – percussion
- David Sanborn – alto saxophone
- Alex Taylor – backing vocals
- Hugh Taylor – backing vocals
- Livingston Taylor – backing vocals
- Marle Tomlinson – backing vocals
