= With Friends and Neighbors =

Studio album by Alex Taylor
- Released: March 1971
- Recorded: 1971
- Genre: Southern rock
- Length: 34:00
- Label: Capricorn
- Producer: Johnny Sandlin

Alex Taylor chronology
With Friends and Neighbors (1971)	Dinnertime (1972)

Professional ratings
Review scores
Source	Rating
Allmusic	4/5 stars
Christgau's Record Guide	B−

Alex Taylor With Friends and Neighbors is the 1971 debut album by Alex Taylor, brother of James, Livingston, Hugh, and Kate Taylor. The album was recorded in Macon, Georgia at Capricorn Studios. The standout tracks are brother James' "Highway Song", "It's All Over Now", along with David Brown & Gregg Allman's "Southbound".

== Track listing ==
1. "Highway Song" (James Taylor) - 3:17
2. "Southern Kids" (Scott Boyer) - 2:31
3. "All in Line" (Tommy Talton) - 2:50
4. "Night Owl" (James Taylor) - 3:20
5. "C Song" (Scott Boyer) - 2:10
6. "It's All Over Now" (Bobby Womack, Shirley Womack) - 3:41
7. "Baby Ruth" (Johnny Wyker) - 3:23
8. "Take Out Some Insurance" (Charles Singleton) - 4:18
9. "Southbound" (Gregg Allman, David Brown) - 8:30

== Personnel ==
- Alex Taylor - vocals
- James Taylor - guitar
- Scott Boyer - guitar, backing vocals
- Tommy Talton - guitar
- Paul Hornsby - keyboards
- Johnny Sandlin - bass
- Peter Kowalke - guitar
- Joe Rudd - guitar
- Bill Stewart - drums
- King Curtis - saxophone
- Willie Bridges - saxophone
- Ronnie Cuber - saxophone
- Frank Wess - saxophone
- Daniel Moore - trumpet
- William S. Fischer - conductor, string arrangements

== Production ==
- Producer: Johnny Sandlin
- Recording Engineer: Lewis Hahn/Jim Hawkins
- Art Direction: Jimmy Roberts
- Photography: Mickey Dobo
- Executive Supervisor: Frank Fenter
