= One Man Dog =

Studio album by James Taylor
- Released: November 1, 1972
- Recorded: Summer 1972
- Studios: Taylor's house; A&R Recording (New York); Clover Recorders (Los Angeles)
- Genre: Soft rock
- Length: 36:48
- Label: Warner Bros.
- Producer: Peter Asher

James Taylor chronology
| Mud Slide Slim and the Blue Horizon (1971) | One Man Dog (1972) | Walking Man (1974) |

Singles from One Man Dog
- 1. "Don't Let Me Be Lonely Tonight" Released: November 1972; 2. "One Man Parade" Released: February 1973; 3. "Hymn" Released: April 1973

One Man Dog is the fourth studio album by singer-songwriter James Taylor. Released on November 1, 1972, it climbed to number 4 on the US Billboard Top LPs & Tape chart. The album features the hit single "Don't Let Me Be Lonely Tonight", which peaked at number 14 on the Billboard Hot 100 chart on January 13, 1973. The follow-up single, "One Man Parade", also charted, but less successfully, peaking at number 67 in the US, and reaching number 55 on the Canadian Adult Contemporary chart.

The basic tracks for the album's 18 tracks, many of which are relatively short, were primarily recorded in Taylor's home studio. A Quadraphonic mix of the album was produced, which included alternate vocal takes and elongated versions of some songs, compared to the standard stereo release.

== Critical reception ==
Upon the release of the album, Berwyn Life critic Steve Sparacio said that it "is certainly James Taylor's best album." He noted that, "Upon first listening, no song on One Man Dog stands out. But as an entity the album holds together extremely well. It may be paradoxical but only after you're able to view One Man Dog as a whole entity do you realize that some of the songs individually are very good." Sparacio identified the themes of the album to be an "affirmation" of Taylor's life at the time, being newly married to Carly Simon and off drugs, and a realization that, if he was going to cope with his life, he needed to turn inward.

Forest Park Review critic John Griffin praised the album's short songs for avoiding the monotony of similar slow melodies that he felt marred Taylor's previous album, Mud Slide Slim (1971). Record World said One Man Dog "contains some interesting departures from [Taylor's] earlier work." Calgary Herald critic Jim Rennie felt the best song on the album was the traditional folk song "One Morning in May", writing that "Taylor joins forces vocally with luscious Linda Ronstadt, and the result is so good I think the combination is worth an album of its own."

On the other hand, Allmusic critic William Ruhlmann wrote years later that the album was a "letdown", saying that "a lot of it was sketchy and seemingly unfinished, and none of it had the impact of the best songs on the last two albums."

Professional ratings
Review scores
| Source | Rating |
|---|---|
| AllMusic | 2.5/5 stars |
| Christgau's Record Guide | C+ |
| Encyclopedia of Popular Music | 3/5 stars |
| MusicHound Rock | 2/5 |
| Rolling Stone | (favorable) |
| The Rolling Stone Album Guide | 2/5 stars |

== Track listing ==
All songs written by James Taylor, except where noted.

Side one

1. "One Man Parade" – 3:10
2. "Nobody But You" – 2:57
3. "Chili Dog" – 1:35
4. "Fool for You" – 1:42
5. "Instrumental I" – 0:55
6. "New Tune" – 1:35
7. "Back on the Street Again" (Danny Kortchmar) – 3:00
8. "Don't Let Me Be Lonely Tonight" – 2:34

Side two

1. "Woh, Don't You Know" (Taylor, Kortchmar, Leland Sklar) – 2:10
2. "One Morning in May" (traditional) – 2:54
3. "Instrumental II" – 1:41
4. "Someone" (John McLaughlin) – 3:36
5. "Hymn" – 2:24
6. "Fanfare" – 2:33
7. "Little David" – 1:00
8. "Mescalito" – 0:29
9. "Dance" – 2:07
10. "Jig" – 1:13

== Personnel ==
- James Taylor – lead vocals, backing vocals (1, 9, 16), acoustic guitar (1, 3, 5–12, 15–18), harmonica (1), electric guitar (2, 4, 14, 18), autoharp (5), bells (11), chainsaw (15), hammer and 4 x 8 (15)
- Danny Kortchmar – electric guitar (1–4, 8, 9, 11, 13–18), timbales (1, 9), acoustic guitar (5, 7, 10, 12)
- John McLaughlin – acoustic guitar (12)
- John Hartford – banjo (17), fiddle (17)
- Dash Crofts – mandolin (17)
- Red Rhodes – steel guitar (17, 18)
- Craig Doerge – acoustic piano (2, 6–10, 12–14, 16, 18), electric piano (2–4, 11, 15)
- Leland Sklar – bass guitar (3–9, 11, 13–18), guitarron mexicano (7, 12, 17)
- Russ Kunkel – congas (1, 2, 6–8, 11), drums (2–5, 8–10, 13–18), tambourine (3, 9), cabasa (6)
- Peter Asher – guiro (1)
- Bobbye Hall – congas (4), tambourine (4), bongos (11), bells (11), shaker (11), percussion (18)
- Mark Paletier – crosscut saw (15)
- George Bohanon – trombone (4)
- Art Baron – bass trombone (13, 14, 18)
- Barry Rogers – trombone (13, 14, 18)
- Michael Brecker – tenor sax solo (8), tenor saxophone (13, 14), soprano saxophone (13), flute (18)
- Randy Brecker – trumpet (13, 14, 18), flugelhorn (13), piccolo trumpet (13)
- Abigale Haness – backing vocals (1, 14, 16)
- Carole King – backing vocals (1, 14, 16)
- Carly Simon – backing vocals (1)
- Alex Taylor – backing vocals (1, 9)
- Hugh Taylor – backing vocals (1, 9)
- Kate Taylor – backing vocals (1)
- Linda Ronstadt – backing vocals (10)

=== Production ===
- Producer – Peter Asher
- Engineers – Peter Asher (Tracks 1, 3, 6, 8, 9, 11, 15 & 16); Robert Appère (Tracks 2, 4, 5, 10 & 12); Phil Ramone (Tracks 7, 13, 14, 17 & 18).
- Tenor sax solo on Track 8 recorded by Phil Ramone.
- Mixed by Robert Appère
- Mastered by Bernie Grundman at A&M Studios (Hollywood, CA).
- Art Direction – Ed Thrasher
- Photography – Peter Simon

== Charts ==
=== Weekly charts ===
| Chart (1973) | Peak position |
|---|---|
| Australia (Kent Music Report) | 13 |
| Canadian RPM Albums Chart | 7 |
| UK Albums Chart | 27 |
| US Billboard 200 | 4 |

=== Year-end charts ===
| Chart (1973) | Position |
|---|---|
| US Billboard Pop Albums | 72 |

=== Certifications ===
| Region | Certification |
|---|---|
| United States (RIAA) | Gold |
