= Highway Song =

Highway Song may refer to:

- "Highway Song" (James Taylor song), 1971
- "Highway Song" (Blackfoot song), 1979
- "Highway Song", a song by Krokus from To You All
- "Highway Song", a song by System of a Down from Steal This Album!
- "Highway Song", a song by Hot Tuna from Burgers
