= You Can Close Your Eyes =

Single by James Taylor

from the album Mud Slide Slim and the Blue Horizon
- A-side: "You've Got a Friend"
- Released: May 1971
- Recorded: 1971
- Genre: Folk rock; soft rock
- Length: 2:31
- Label: Warner Bros.
- Songwriter: James Taylor
- Producer: Peter Asher

James Taylor singles chronology
"Country Road" (1971)	"You Can Close Your Eyes" (1971)	"Long Ago and Far Away" (1971)

"You Can Close Your Eyes" is a song written by James Taylor which was released on his third studio album Mud Slide Slim and the Blue Horizon (1971). It was also released as the B-side to his #1 single "You've Got a Friend". It has often been described as a lullaby. It was initially recorded and released by his sister Kate Taylor for her 1971 album Sister Kate. The song has been covered by many artists, including Taylor's ex-wife Carly Simon, Linda Ronstadt, Maureen McGovern, Richie Havens, Sheryl Crow, Sting, Eddie Vedder with Natalie Maines, and the King's Singers.

== James Taylor's version ==
Taylor wrote "You Can Close Your Eyes" about a year before it was recorded in early 1971. Taylor regards it as "a secular hymn." Rock journalist Dave Thompson considers it one of the best songs Taylor had written up to that point. Allmusic critic Bill Janovitz describes "You Can Close Your Eyes" as "a beautiful lullaby", and Rolling Stone critic Ben Gerson similarly calls it "an exquisite lullaby." Critic Al Rudis goes further, saying that the song "continues [Taylor's] hold on the world championship of lullaby composers." Allmusic's William Ruhlmann describes it as a "moving" song that affirms romance. Martin Charles Strong describes it as being "lovely" and "more affecting" than "You've Got a Friend." Musicologist James Perone finds similarities between the melody of the verses of "You Can Close Your Eyes" and the chorus of Taylor's earlier song "Carolina in My Mind." Gerson compares the song's melody to that of Cat Stevens' "Here Comes My Baby."

Janovitz points out a duality in the lyrics. The lyrics attempt to comfort the singer's lover, possibly after a fight. But the lyrics also sound a possibly ominous note, in that he sings "But I can sing this song/And you can sing this song when I'm gone," suggesting that he may be leaving her soon, although it is not specified whether "I'm gone" refers to ending the relationship or just going away for a while. Perone notes that the theme of a singer who can't express his feelings except through song gives "You Can Close Your Eyes" an "autobiographical-sounding feeling of authenticity." Perone also feels that the "unconventional overall structure and somewhat unpredictable phrase structure" produces a feeling of "from-the-heart spontaneity." Gerson notes that the themes in the song of farewell and that this could be the singer's last song are themes that run throughout the Mud Slide Slim album, calling "You Can Close Your Eyes" "the song which repudiates songs."

Authors including Thompson and Sheila Weller have suggested that the song was written to Taylor's one-time girlfriend Joni Mitchell. Taylor has confirmed this theory, stating during at least one stage performance that it was written for Mitchell. The song was written while Taylor and Mitchell were staying in a hotel in Tucumcari, NM as Taylor was filming "Two-Lane Blacktop." The only instrumentation is Taylor's acoustic guitar, although live performances confirm that the closing riff actually blends two guitars to create the baroque effect. Janovitz praises Taylor's "exquisite" guitar playing, particularly noting the "Renaissance-meets-country-folk riff" at the beginning and end of the song. He also praises Taylor's "vulnerable" "quiet" singing.

Taylor has performed "You Can Close Your Eyes" in live concerts many times, typically accompanied by other singers (quite often female). He performed it with Mitchell during the early 1970s. One such performance, from October 16, 1970, is included on the 2009 album Amchitka. In October 2021, Joni Mitchell released a 1970 duet of her and then-boyfriend Taylor singing "You Can Close Your Eyes," which is to appear on her retrospective Joni Mitchell Archives Vol. 2: The Reprise Years (1968 To 1971).

A performance with Carole King is included on the 2010 album Live at the Troubadour. A solo live performance leads off the 1998 video Live at the Beacon Theater, another live performance is the penultimate track on the 2002 video Pull Over and a different solo live performance closes the 2007 live album One Man Band. The same live performance from One Man Band is included on The Essential James Taylor. The 1998 live version was also included on the Japanese release of the compilation album Greatest Hits Volume 2. The studio version was included on the compilation album The Best of James Taylor. On September 11, 2011, Taylor performed the song in New York City at the National September 11 Memorial & Museum for the 10th anniversary of the 9/11 attacks. The song also was a regular set closer from 2004-12 (with the exception of the summer of 2006 and much of 2008), and 2017-19. In 2021 Taylor began performing it as a duet with his son Henry who had joined the band as a singer that year.

== Cover versions ==
Linda Ronstadt covered "You Can Close Your Eyes" as the closing track of her 1974 album Heart Like a Wheel. According to music journalist Dave Thompson, producer Peter Asher, who produced both Taylor's Mud Slide Slim and Ronstadt's Heart Like a Wheel, reinvented the song for Ronstadt. Thompson considers it a "highlight" of Heart Like a Wheel.

James Taylor's ex-wife Carly Simon covered the song on her 2007 album Into White accompanied by her children with Taylor, Sally Taylor and Ben Taylor. Author Sheila Weller describes this version as "slow, spectral" and "achingly beautiful." According to Allmusic critic Thom Jurek, mother and children "perform gorgeously" on this version.

Richie Havens covered "You Can Close Your Eyes" on his 1976 album The End of the Beginning. Maureen McGovern covered "You Can Close Your Eyes" as the closing track of her 1992 album Baby I'm Yours. Sheryl Crow covered it on her 2003 album Artist's Choice: Sheryl Crow. The a cappella group the King's Singers covered the song on their 2008 album Simple Gifts and The Young'uns covered it a cappella on their 2012 album When Our Grandfathers Said No.

Sting performed "You Can Close Your Eyes" for a tribute concert for James Taylor in 2006. Pearl Jam's Eddie Vedder, accompanied by the Dixie Chicks' Natalie Maines covered the song in concert in 2010.

Jacob Collier covered "You Can Close Your Eyes" on his 2025 album The Light For Days.
