= Mud Slide Slim and the Blue Horizon =

Studio album by James Taylor
- Released: April 1971
- Recorded: January 3 – February 28, 1971
- Studio: Crystal Sound Studios, Los Angeles
- Genre: Folk rock
- Length: 37:07
- Label: Warner Bros.
- Producer: Peter Asher

James Taylor chronology
1967 (1971)	Mud Slide Slim and the Blue Horizon (1971)	One Man Dog (1972)

Singles from Mud Slide Slim and the Blue Horizon
- 1. "You've Got a Friend" Released: May 1971; 2. "Long Ago and Far Away" Released: September 1971

Mud Slide Slim and the Blue Horizon is the third studio album by American singer-songwriter James Taylor. Released in April 1971 by Warner Bros. Records, it was recorded between early January and late February of the same year.

== Release and promotion ==
The album contains Taylor's biggest hit single in the US, a cover version of Carole King's "You've Got a Friend". On July 31, 1971, his recording of the song hit number 1 on the Billboard Hot 100 chart, his only single to do so. A week earlier, the album had reached its peak position of number 2 on Billboard's Top LPs chart. It was kept from the top spot by King, who was ruling the charts with her blockbuster album Tapestry, which contained her own version of "You've Got a Friend". The song earned Grammy Awards both for Taylor (Best Pop Vocal Performance, Male) and King (Song of the Year). Mud Slide Slim generated another Top 40 hit in "Long Ago and Far Away", which reached number 31 on the Billboard Hot 100. Other songs on the album became standards of Taylor's concert repertoire, particularly "You Can Close Your Eyes".

== Critical reception ==
Retrospective professional reviews
Review scores
Source	Rating
AllMusic	4/5 stars
Christgau's Record Guide	C+
MusicHound Rock	3/5
Rolling Stone Album Guide	3.5/5 stars
Encyclopedia of Popular Music	4/5 stars

Reviewing for Rolling Stone in 1971, Ben Gerson found the album to be "dull listening" the first few times, but wrote that, "Once the melodies begin to sink in, and the LP's raison d'etre is discovered, the album's subtle tensions begin to appear. And while the album at this point makes for pleasant, absorbing listening, there is a terrible weariness to it which is part of its artistic statement."

Village Voice critic Robert Christgau was more critical of Taylor's songwriting, writing in 1981: "Having squandered most of the songs on his big success, he's concentrating on the intricate music--the lyrics are more onanistic than ever, escapist as a matter of conscious thematic decision. From what? you well may wonder. From success, poor fella. Blues singers lived on the road out of economic necessity, although they often got into it; Taylor is an addict, pure and simple. A born-rich nouveau star who veers between a 'homestead on the farm' (what does he raise there, hopes?) and the Holiday Inn his mean old existential dilemma compels him to call home deserves the conniving, self-pitying voice that is his curse. Interesting, intricate, unlistenable."

In 2000 Mud Slide Slim was voted number 858 in Colin Larkin's All Time Top 1000 Albums.

== Track listing ==
"You've Got A Friend"
James Taylor's "You've Got A Friend" from Mud Slide Slim and the Blue Horizon

All songs by James Taylor unless otherwise noted.

Side one

1. "Love Has Brought Me Around" – 2:41
2. "You've Got a Friend" (Carole King) – 4:28
3. "Places in My Past" – 2:01
4. "Riding on a Railroad" – 2:41
5. "Soldiers" – 1:13
6. "Mud Slide Slim" – 5:20

Side two

1. "Hey Mister, That's Me up on the Jukebox" – 3:46
2. "You Can Close Your Eyes" – 2:31
3. "Machine Gun Kelly" (Danny Kortchmar) – 2:37
4. "Long Ago and Far Away" – 2:20
5. "Let Me Ride" – 2:42
6. "Highway Song" – 3:51
7. "Isn't It Nice to Be Home Again" – 0:55

== Personnel ==
- James Taylor – lead vocals, backing vocals (1, 2, 6, 9–12), acoustic guitar (1, 2, 4–11, 13), piano (3, 12)
- Russ Kunkel – drums (1–7, 9–12), congas (1, 2, 6, 11), cowbell and small cymbals (1), cabasa (2), tambourine (9)
- Leland Sklar – bass guitar (1–7, 10–12)
- Carole King – piano (1, 4–7, 10, 12), backing vocals (6)
- Danny Kortchmar – electric guitar (1, 6, 11), congas (1, 2, 9–11), acoustic guitar (2, 9), guitar (3)
- Peter Asher – tambourine (1), backing vocals (9, 12)
- Wayne Jackson (trumpet), Andrew Love (tenor saxophone), and The Memphis Horns – horn arrangements and horns (1, 11)
- Joni Mitchell – backing vocals (1, 2, 10)
- Kevin Kelly – accordion (3), piano (11)
- John Hartford – banjo (4)
- Richard Greene – fiddle (4)
- Kate Taylor – backing vocals (6, 11, 12)
- Gale Haness – backing vocals (6)

=== Production ===
- Producer – Peter Asher
- Engineer – Richard Sanford Orshoff
- Art Direction – Ed Thrasher
- Liner Artwork – Laurie Miller
- Cover Photography – Ethan Russell

== Charts ==
=== Weekly charts ===
Chart (1971)	Peak position
Australia (Kent Music Report)	12
Canadian RPM Albums Chart	4
Norwegian Albums Chart	17
UK Albums Chart	4
U.S. Billboard Top LPs	2

=== Year-end charts ===
Chart (1971)	Position
U.S. Billboard Pop Albums	27

== Certifications ==
Region	Certification	Certified units/sales
United States (RIAA)	2× Platinum	2,000,000^{^}
^{^} Shipments figures based on certification alone.
