= Sister Kate =

Sister Kate may refer to:

- Katherine Mary Clutterbuck (1860-1946), an Anglican nun known as Sister Kate who ran orphanages for Aboriginal children in Western Australia
- Sister Kate (TV series), an American television sitcom
- Sister Kate Valentine, a character from Chrono Crusade
- "I Wish I Could Shimmy Like My Sister Kate", a song and tune published by Clarence Williams and Armand Piron in 1919
- Sister Kate (album), a 1971 album by Kate Taylor
- Sister Kate, a 1982 novel by Jean Bedford, based on the life of Ned Kelly's sister, Kate Kelly
