= Last Alaska Moon =

Studio album by Livingston Taylor
- Released: April 27, 2010
- Recorded: Paragon Recording Studio, Franklin, TN May 2009
- Genre: Folk, bluegrass, jazz
- Label: Chesky
- Producer: Glenn Rosenstein

Livingston Taylor chronology
There You Are Again (2006)	Last Alaska Moon (2010)	Blue Sky (2014)

Last Alaska Moon is an album by Livingston Taylor released by Coconut Bay, a division of Chesky Records, in 2010. The album was very well received.

== Track listing ==
1. Last Alaska Moon (Livingston Taylor) - 3:12
2. Everybody's Just Like Me (Livingston Taylor) - 3:05
3. Henry (Livingston Taylor) - 3:04
4. I'm Letting the Whiskey Do My Talking (Livingston Taylor) - 4:05
5. The Girl Is Mine (Michael Jackson) - 3:56
6. Kitty Hawk (Livingston Taylor) - 3:43
7. Never Lose Hope (Livingston Taylor) - 3:04
8. Christmas Is Almost Here (Livingston Taylor) - 3:17
9. Answer My Prayer (Livingston Taylor, Carole Bayer Sager) - 4:02
10. I'm in a Pickle (Livingston Taylor) - 3:15
11. Walk Until It's Heaven (Livingston Taylor) - 3:26
12. Call Me Carolina (Livingston Taylor) - 5:34
