= Echoes (Livingston Taylor album) =

Greatest hits album by Livingston Taylor
- Released: 1979
- Recorded: various
- Genre: Rock
- Label: Capricorn
- Producer: Nick DeCaro

Livingston Taylor chronology
Three Way Mirror (1978)	Echoes (1979)	Man's Best Friend (1980)

Echoes is singer-songwriter Livingston Taylor's fifth album, released in 1979. The album is a "greatest hits" sampler of songs from Taylor's first three albums.

Professional ratings
Review scores
Source	Rating
Allmusic	link
Christgau's Record Guide	C+

== Track listing ==
All tracks composed by Livingston Taylor; except where indicated

1. "Get Out of Bed" – 2:49
2. "On Broadway" (Barry Mann, Cynthia Weil, Jerry Leiber, Mike Stoller) – 3:37
3. "Carolina Day" – 3:08
4. "Lady Tomorrow" – 2:41
5. "Caroline" – 2:16
6. "Lost in the Love of You" – 3:00
7. "Loving Be My New Horizon" – 1:45
8. "Can't Get Back Home" – 2:25
9. "Gentleman" – 3:14
10. "Over the Rainbow" (Harold Arlen, E.Y. Harburg) – 2:41
11. "If I Needed Someone" (George Harrison) – 2:56
12. "Hush a Bye" – 2:38

== Personnel ==
- Livingston Taylor – guitar, keyboards, vocals
