= Into White (album) =

Studio album by Carly Simon
- Released: January 2, 2007
- Recorded: Summer 2006
- Genre: Standards
- Length: 41:36
- Label: Columbia
- Producer: Jimmy Parr

Carly Simon chronology
| Moonlight Serenade (2005) | Into White (2007) | This Kind of Love (2008) |

Into White is the 21st studio album by American singer-songwriter Carly Simon, released by Columbia Records, on January 2, 2007. It was also her final release with the label before departing the same year.

It is her fifth album of standards, following Torch (1981), My Romance (1990), Film Noir (1997), and Moonlight Serenade (2005). The album was produced by the Martha's Vineyard producer Jimmy Parr, with whom Simon has worked extensively as his studio is close to her Tisbury farm. Simon's children, Sally Taylor and Ben Taylor, appear on the album. The three perform a choral trio on the track "You Can Close Your Eyes" (a cover of her ex-husband and their father James Taylor's 1971 song).

Following the successes of Reflections: Carly Simon's Greatest Hits (2004) and Moonlight Serenade (2005), Into White continued Simon's recently rejuvenated high chart profile and became Billboard's Hot Shot Debut, entering the chart at No. 15 and peaking at No. 13 in its second week, and staying on the charts for 10 weeks. The album also hit No. 1 on the Top Internet Albums chart.

== Reception ==
Professional ratings
Review scores
| Source | Rating |
|---|---|
| AllMusic | 3/5 stars |
| Entertainment Weekly | B |
| PopMatters | 8/10 stars |

Into White was met with widespread critical acclaim. PopMatters rated the album 8-out-of-10-stars and called it "the first musical gift to grace 2007." They also singled out the track "You Can Close Your Eyes", stating: "There's a shimmering beauty that's particular to how familial voices intertwine and the union of these three voices is singularly beautiful", and concluded "Ultimately, Into White serves the legacy of Carly Simon very well." People called the album "a tranquil collection of covers that play like lullabies for grown-ups" and praised the track "You Can Close Your Eyes", calling it "the best moment on the album". In her 2008 book Girls Like Us: Carole King, Joni Mitchell, Carly Simon-And the Journey of a Generation, author Sheila Weller describes this version of "You Can Close Your Eyes" as "slow, spectral" and "achingly beautiful."

Entertainment Weekly graded the album B, describing it as a "richly personal disc." AllMusic stated: "In sum, Into White may be the best record Simon's made since The Bedroom Tapes, and it takes a place in her catalog alongside Torch and Boys in the Trees." The New York Times stated "Entering the world of Carly Simon’s new album is like tiptoeing into an enchanted garden. The fanciful Cat Stevens song that opens the record establishes a mood of deep, dreamy calm that is sustained over 14 songs."

== Track listing ==
Credits adapted from the album's liner notes.

| No. | Title | Writer(s) | Length |
|---|---|---|---|
| 1. | "Into White" | Cat Stevens | 2:49 |
| 2. | "Oh! Susanna" | Stephen Foster; Carly Simon (arr.) | 2:58 |
| 3. | "Blackbird" | John Lennon; Paul McCartney | 2:30 |
| 4. | "You Can Close Your Eyes" (with Sally and Ben Taylor) | James Taylor | 3:21 |
| 5. | "Quiet Evening" | David Saw | 4:22 |
| 6. | "Manhã de Carnaval" | Luiz Bonfá | 2:22 |
| 7. | "Jamaica Farewell" | Irving Burgie | 3:29 |
| 8. | "You Are My Sunshine" | Jimmie Davis; Charles Mitchell | 2:36 |
| 9. | "I Gave My Love a Cherry (The Riddle Song)" | Traditional; Simon (arr.) | 2:51 |
| 10. | "Devoted to You/All I Have to Do Is Dream" | Boudleaux Bryant; Felice Bryant | 2:58 |
| 11. | "Scarborough Fair" | Traditional; Simon (arr.) | 3:38 |
| 12. | "Over the Rainbow" | Harold Arlen; Yip Harburg | 2:24 |
| 13. | "Love of My Life" | Simon | 2:54 |
| 14. | "I'll Just Remember You" | Ben Taylor; Saw | 2:24 |
| Total length: | | | 41:36 |

Barnes & Noble exclusive bonus track
| No. | Title | Writer(s) | Length |
|---|---|---|---|
| 15. | "Hush Little Baby/My Bonnie" | Traditional; Simon (arr.) | 5:02 |
| Total length: | | | 46:38 |

== Alternate versions ==
- A special copy of the album was released by Barnes & Noble with a bonus track, "Hush Little Baby/My Bonnie".

== Credits ==
=== Musicians ===
- Carly Simon – lead vocals, backing vocals, acoustic guitar, arrangements
- Teese Gohl – keyboards, acoustic piano, electric piano, synth strings, synth cello, bass, percussion, hammered dulcimer, bodhrán, kalimba, flute, pizzicato, arrangements
- Peter Calo – guitars, 8-string guitar, dobro
- David Saw – guitars
- Jimmy Parr – bass, percussion, kalimba, woodblock, backing vocals
- Ben Taylor – harmony vocals (4)
- Sally Taylor – harmony vocals (4)

=== Production ===
- Carly Simon – producer
- Jimmy Parr – co-producer, engineer, mixing
- Jay Landers – executive producer
- Frank Wolf – mixing
- Bob Ludwig – mastering
- Jill Dell'Abate – production coordination
- Michelle Holme – art direction, design
- Sally Taylor – photography
- Jay Krugman – marketing consultant
- Denise Searle – personal assistant

== Charts ==
| Chart (2007) | Peak position |
|---|---|
| US Billboard 200 | 13 |
