= Secular hymn (genre) =

Genre of non-religious popular song

A secular hymn is a type of non-religious popular song that has elements in common with religious music, especially with Christian hymns. The concept goes back at least as far as 17 BCE when the Roman emperor Augustus commissioned the Roman poet Horace to write lyrics by that title ("Carmen Saeculare" in Latin). The idea has been recognized in popular music at least since the late 1960s and early 1970s when people began to see a pattern in songs, such as "Bridge Over Troubled Water" by Simon and Garfunkel, "Let it Be" by the Beatles, and "Fire and Rain" by James Taylor, which came out at about the same time. "Hallelujah" (which was written by Leonard Cohen in 1984, but only became famous when Jeff Buckley's 1994 version redefined the song) has since been called perhaps the quintessential secular hymn despite the lyrics containing strong Jewish themes.

Other songs that are sometimes mentioned as secular hymns include "People Get Ready" by Jeff Beck and Rod Stewart, "Many Rivers to Cross" by Jimmy Cliff, "I Can See Clearly Now" by Johnny Nash, "Joy to the World" by Three Dog Night, "Hey, Jude" by the Beatles, "Big Yellow Taxi" by Joni Mitchell, "No Woman, No Cry" by Bob Marley, "Going My Way" by Bing Crosby, "Blowin' in the Wind" by Bob Dylan, "Like a Prayer" by Madonna, "Both Sides Now" by Joni Mitchell (famously covered by Judy Collins), "Show Me Heaven" by Maria McKee, "Lean On Me" by Bill Withers, "Stand by Me" by Ben E. King, "You Can Close Your Eyes" by James Taylor, "Somewhere Over the Rainbow" by Judy Garland, "Imagine" by John Lennon, "Free Fallin'" by Tom Petty, "What a Wonderful World" by Louis Armstrong, and "Million Reasons" by Lady Gaga, and many others.

Determining exactly what does and does not qualify as a secular hymn is obviously difficult. Professor Steve Thomsen, BYU communications professor, suggests six criteria including that the song transcends generations, that it is about redemption or deliverance, that it has spiritual overtones, that it includes metaphors referring to up or down and/or to light and dark, that its meaning transcends initial purpose, and that it has become used as a backdrop for important life events. Richard Wilson suggests a secular hymn needs only to be written as an anthem with a positive theme that does not gloss over the difficulties of life.
