= Long Ago and Far Away (James Taylor song) =

- Dutch cover

Single by James Taylor

from the album Mud Slide Slim and the Blue Horizon
- B-side: "Let Me Ride"
- Released: 1971
- Recorded: 1971
- Genre: Folk rock, soft rock
- Length: 2:20
- Label: Warner Bros.
- Songwriter: James Taylor
- Producer: Peter Asher

James Taylor singles chronology
"You Can Close Your Eyes" (1971)	"Long Ago and Far Away" (1971)	"Don't Let Me Be Lonely Tonight" (1972)

"Long Ago and Far Away" is a song written by James Taylor and first released on his 1971 album Mud Slide Slim and the Blue Horizon. It was the follow-up single to "You've Got a Friend" and became a top 40 hit in the U.S. and a top 20 hit in Canada, and made the top 10 on the Adult Contemporary chart in the U.S. It has been covered by New York Voices and Johnny Mathis.

== Lyrics and music ==
Taylor wrote "Long Ago and Far Away" in 1970, about a year before it was recorded for Mud Slide Slim. Joni Mitchell sings background vocals and Carole King plays piano. It is a sad song that Taylor biographer Timothy White calls "among the most wistful of Taylor's vast catalogue of secular hymns." The theme of the song is how things don't turn out as planned, how dreams don't usually match the ultimate reality and how expectations don't last. The lyrics describe a young man whose dreams have not come true. The lyrics evoke a motif common in Taylor's songs, that of the sea and sailing away for one reason or another. Other images in the lyrics include "tender dreams" and "broken glass." Towards the end of the song the singer asks why his song is so sad. The phrase "long ago and far away" never appears in the lyrics. Rather, Taylor sings that "Long ago a young man sits and plays his waiting game." In 1998 Taylor noted that the lyrics in the second verse "Love is just a word I've heard when things are being said" was the "most coherent" part of the song for him at that time, stating that "it is a musing on the nature of expectations, and how they don't last.

Critic Al Rudis notes a resemblance between some of the melody of "Long Ago and Far Away" and that of "Sunny Skies," a song from Taylor's prior album Sweet Baby James. Journalist Peggy Mulloy Glad regards it as an example of how Taylor can use his vocal and guitar playing to "communicate the pain, melancholy and desires that most people experience but few can express." Musicologist James Perone explains that one of Taylor's means of achieving this is that "some of the melodic notes touch and linger on the upper extensions of the chords. He explains that this may be heard as mild dissonances, which may imply sadness. The dissonances also give the song a jazz feel, which is enhanced by Danny Kortchmar's conga-playing. Perone also points out that the song uses many chords that include notes beyond the standard three-note triad.

== Reception ==
Music journalist Dave Thompson described the song as "slight." But Rudis considers it a "nice dreamy number." Author Ian Halperin regards it as the most daring song on Mud Slide Slim. Thirteen years after its initial release, critic Doug Robinson called it a "lesser known gem." Rolling Stone Album Guide critic Mark Coleman considered it the one song on Mud Slide Slim that wasn't sappy or flaccid. Cash Box described the song as a "musical gem," stating that the "simple tune rings with sincerity and sparkle with the fine Peter Asher production touch." Record World said "Mellow as can be, with expert background vocal by girlfriend Joni. Nicer harmony can't be heard anywhere." Taylor himself considers it "a sentimental song, but good."

"Long Ago and Far Away" reached number 31 on the Billboard Hot 100 and reached number 4 on the Billboard Adult Contemporary chart. It reached number 12 in Canada, as well as number 9 on the Canadian Adult Contemporary chart.

== Personnel ==
- James Taylor – lead and backing vocals, acoustic guitar
- Danny Kortchmar – congas
- Carole King – piano
- Leland Sklar – bass guitar
- Russ Kunkel – drums
- Joni Mitchell – backing vocals

== Other appearances ==
"Long Ago and Far Away" was included on the compilation albums The Best of James Taylor and The Essential James Taylor. A live recording opens the album James Taylor Live in Rio.

New York Voices covered "Long Ago and Far Away" on the 2001 album Sketches of James: Selection from the James Taylor Songbook. Johnny Mathis covered the song on his 1971 album You've Got a Friend. Mathis also released his version as a single. Billboard Magazine described Mathis' version, produced by Richard Perry, as a "ballad beauty" delivered "in top form."
