= Beautiful Road =

Studio album by Kate Taylor
- Released: 2003
- Genre: Folk
- Length: 45:40
- Label: CBS
- Producer: Charlie Witham, Tony Garnier

Kate Taylor chronology
| It's in There (1979) | Beautiful Road (2003) | Kate Taylor Live at The Cutting Room (2005) |

Beautiful Road is the fourth album by the American singer-songwriter Kate Taylor, released in 2003.

After Taylor's previous album, 1979's It's in There failed to reach the public, Taylor took a break from the music industry for the next two decades, during which time she appeared sporadically as a performer and back-up singer for various artists, not releasing another album until Beautiful Road in 2003.

The album contained new material, not the primarily covers of her previous work. Most songs were written by Taylor's husband and manager, Charlie Witham. Unfortunately, Witham fell ill while the album was being recorded and would die shortly before it was released in April 2003.

The album closes with a version of "Auld Lang Syne", arranged by Taylor's brother James. Taylor covered the song himself the following year as the last song on James Taylor: A Christmas Album (2004).

== Track listing ==
All tracks composed by Charlie Witham; except where indicated

1. "I Will Fly" – 5:28
2. "Beautiful Road" (Erica Wheeler) – 3:53
3. "Blue Tin Suitcase" – 4:23
4. "The Golden Key" – 6:19
5. "Rain on the Water" – 4:58
6. "Flying in the Face of Mr. Blue" (Randall Bramblett, Davis Causey, Bucky Jones) – 5:26
7. "Shanty Song" – 4:05
8. "He's Waiting" (Kate Taylor) – 2:42
9. "Shores of Paradise" – 5:18
10. "Auld Lang Syne" (Robert Burns; Traditional) – 3:08

== Personnel ==
- Kate Taylor – vocals
- Kevin Barry – acoustic guitar
- Richard Bell – piano
- Peter Calo – acoustic guitar
- Larry Campbell – electric guitar
- Clifford Carter – synthesizer
- Shannon Ford – percussion, drums
- Tony Garnier – bass, tambourine
- Vance Gilbert – acoustic guitar
- Tom Hambridge – drums, tambourine
- Levon Helm – mandolin
- Mindy Jostyn – guitar, violin
- Stuart Kimball – acoustic guitar
- Chuck Leavell – organ, piano
- Dennis McDermott – drums
- Arlen Roth – acoustic guitar, electric guitar, Fender telecaster
- Mavis Staples – vocals
- James Taylor – vocals
