= Three Way Mirror =

Studio album by Livingston Taylor
- Released: 1978
- Recorded: 1978
- Genre: Adult contemporary
- Length: 31:33
- Label: Epic
- Producer: Nick DeCaro

Livingston Taylor chronology
| Over the Rainbow (1973) | Three Way Mirror (1978) | Echoes (1979) |

Professional ratings
Review scores
| Source | Rating |
|---|---|
| Allmusic | 4.5/5 stars |

Three Way Mirror is singer-songwriter Livingston Taylor's fourth album, released in 1978.

Its ten tracks produced the song that was perhaps Taylor's biggest hit, "I Will Be In Love With You", as well as "Going Round One More Time", later covered by Taylor's brother James on his 1985 album That's Why I'm Here.

Record World said that "I'll Come Running" "has an easy jazz beat and Taylor's smooth vocals for accent."

Taylor promoted the album by touring as the opening act for Linda Ronstadt during her "Living in the USA" national tour.

== Track listing ==
1. "Going Round One More Time"
2. "L.A. Serenade"
3. "Gonna Have a Good Time"
4. "Train Off The Track"
5. "I Will Be in Love With You"
6. "No Thank You Skycap"
7. "I'll Come Running"
8. "Living Without You"
9. "Southern Kids"
10. "How Much Your Sweet Love Means to Me"

== Personnel ==
- Livingston Taylor — Guitar, keyboards, vocals
- Mike Baird, Ed Greene, Jim Keltner — Drums
- Gary Coleman — Marimba
- Nick DeCaro — Producer, Arranger and Accordion
- Frank DeCaro — Music Contractor and Album Supervisor
- Joe DiBlasi, Fred Tackett — Acoustic guitar
- Linda Dillard — Background vocals
- Scott Edwards, David Hungate — Bass guitar
- Shelby Flint — Background vocals
- Steve Forman — Percussion
- Jerry Hey, Steve Madaio — Flugelhorn
- Jon Joyce — Background vocals
- Maria Muldaur — Vocals
- Brian Ray, Lee Ritenour — Electric guitar
- Billy Joe Walker Jr. — Acoustic guitar, electric guitar
- Jai Winding — Piano

== Charts ==
Singles – Billboard (North America)

| Year | Single | Chart | Position |
|---|---|---|---|
| 1979 | "I Will Be In Love With You" | Pop Singles | 30 |
| 1979 | "I'll Come Running" | Pop Singles | 82 |
