= This Week's Music =

This Week’s Music is an American syndicated half-hour television show originally hosted by Livingston Taylor, brother of singer James Taylor. Similar to American Bandstand, the show featured dancers in a studio, music videos of popular hits, and live musical guests. In 1984 the show aired five days a week in some markets. Many consider this show as the predecessor to Club MTV. Courteney Cox (prior to her appearance in the Dancing in the Dark video) and New York radio personality Al Bandeiro took over for Livingston Taylor toward the end of the show's run.

This Week’s Music is a joint production of The Entertainment Television Company and Viacom International. The show’s Executive Producers are Charles Koppelman and Martin Bandier.

== Studio Dancers ==
- Myra Bazell
- Frank Chaves
- Bonnie Comley
- Meghan Doyle
- Taro Anthony
- Rachael Goodman
- Michael Kagdis
- Jim Manning
- Lori Macpherson
- Margaret Molz
- John Pititto
- Louis Ritarossi
- Ronnie Robinson
- Myles Thoroughgood
- J. Buzz Von Ornsteiner
- Lisa Washington
- Michael Landsman
- Tommy Gibbons
- LaTrice Verrett
- Ernest Verrett
- Carle Anthony Payne
- Charlie Mount
- Terry(Theresa Fiorillo) Adams

== Notable Musical Guests ==
- Paul McCartney
- Comateens
- Cyndi Lauper
- Billy Ocean
- Jon Bon Jovi
- Menudo (band)
- Dan Hartman
- Van Stevenson
- Chequered past with Tony Fox Sales
- Flock of Seagulls
- Berlin
- Mama's Boys
- Honeymoon Suite
- Face to Face
- New Edition
- Alfonso Ribeiro
- Chaka Khan
- Patty Smyth
- Bananarama
