= Highway Song (James Taylor song) =

Single by Alex Taylor

from the album With Friends and Neighbors
- B-side: "C Song"
- Released: 1971
- Genre: Folk Rock
- Length: 3:17
- Label: Capricorn Records
- Songwriter: James Taylor
- Producer: Johnny Sandlin

"Highway Song"

Song by James Taylor

from the album Mud Slide Slim and the Blue Horizon
- Released: 1971
- Recorded: 1971
- Genre: Folk rock
- Length: 3:51
- Label: Warner Bros. Records
- Songwriter: James Taylor
- Producer: Peter Asher

"Highway Song" is a song written by James Taylor. It was first released by James Taylor's brother Alex Taylor on his 1971 album With Friends and Neighbors and as the lead single from the album. It was released by James Taylor later that year on his album Mud Slide Slim and the Blue Horizon.

== Lyrics and music ==
Taylor wrote "Highway Song" in 1970 and he began playing it in live concerts during 1970, well before the release on Mudslide Slim and the Blue Horizon.

Rolling Stone critic Ben Gerson contrasts "Highway Song" with another song on Mudslide Slim and the Blue Horizon, "Mud Slide Slim," by noting that "Highway Song" provides "a more philosophical, realistic analysis" by acknowledging that "a person chooses his circumstances as much as circumstances choose him." The song describes a journey, in which the highway represents punishment but also, according to Gerson, "has an irresistable [sic], sinister allure." According to Taylor biographer Timothy White, the song was inspired by the difficult traveling Taylor had to do now since becoming a star musician with the release of his first two albums, as well his own confusion about being the center of attention in his family at the time his brothers and sister were also embarking on musical careers. Los Angeles Times columnist Dan Neil links Taylor's "Highway Song" with Bruce Springsteen's "Born to Run" as songs of "wanderlust," in which the road is used as a metaphor for the replacement of adventure and faith for security and certainty. Author Grace Lichtenstein described Gram Parson's "Grievous Angel" as being a "first cousin" to "Highway Song" in its "lament about purposelessness and need for love."

The lyrics begin with the lines "Father let us build a boat and sail away/There's nothing for you here/And brother let us throw our lot out upon the sea/It's been done before." Gerson describes this as "a brief, Biblical introduction, as if Noah were preparing for the Deluge." White regards this introduction as a continuation of a theme from Taylor's earlier song "Country Road," in which problems are resolved by going away. Another line from the song is "Sweet misunderstanding won't you leave a poor boy alone." This line referred to many misunderstandings that were accumulating around Taylor in his first exposure to fame, and particularly the misunderstanding by many listeners that the line "Won't you look down upon me Jesus" from his popular song "Fire and Rain" was meant in a fundamentalist Christian context. Gerson points out that although the lyrics refer to traveling on the highway, the title "Highway Song" refers to a song he says he heard along the way, and not to the lyrics of the song itself, making this a metasong.

A simple, repeated figure (music) predominates the melody. According to Gerson, this "contributes to the sense of Sisyphean doom." Gerson also points out that the song's "swooping bass line," played by Leland Sklar on James Taylor's recording, also contributes to the song's sense of inescapable despair.

Billboard described "Highway Song" as one of James Taylor's best songs. Critic Al Rudis described it as "great" song, while preferring Alex Taylor's version to James'.

== Alex Taylor version ==
Alex Taylor released "Highway Song" on With Friends and Neighbors and as a single prior to the release of his brother James' version. Billboard predicted that the single would perform well on the Billboard Hot 100 despite being Taylor's debut single. It did get strong radio play on some stations, such as WNUR-FM. Alex' version excludes the opening lines from James' version about the father and brother sailing out to sea. Rolling Stone critic Timothy Crouse stated that Alex's singing of the "Sweet misunderstanding won't you leave a poor boy alone" line revealed his "blues streak." Rudis preferred Alex's version to James' on the basis of its greater passion and what Rudis regarded as a "nicer ending." Record World said that "Alex Taylor is actually talented and shines on this one penned by brother James" and called the single "quality listening." Tuscaloosa News editor Ben Windham compared Alex's version to Brook Benton's rendition of "Rainy Night in Georgia," citing the "deep soul singing, sparse instrumental backing" and its use of string instruments. Fred Kirby of Billboard described it as having a "rustic blues feel.
