= Liv (Livingston Taylor album) =

Studio album by Livingston Taylor
- Released: November 1971
- Genre: Rock
- Length: 34:51
- Label: Capricorn
- Producer: Jon Landau

Livingston Taylor chronology
Livingston Taylor (1970)	Liv (1971)	Over the Rainbow (1973)

Professional ratings
Review scores
Source	Rating
Allmusic	link
Christgau's Record Guide	C

Liv is the second studio album by the rock artist Livingston Taylor. It was released in 1971 on Capricorn Records. The album's eleven tracks include ten of Taylor's own songs, and a cover rendition of "On Broadway".

== Track listing ==
All tracks composed by Livingston Taylor; except where indicated

1. "Get Out of Bed" – 2:49
2. "May I Stay Around" – 3:31
3. "Open Up Your Eyes" – 2:52
4. "Gentleman" – 3:14
5. "Easy Prey" – 4:42
6. "Be That Way" – 3:06
7. "Truck Driving Man" – 3:18
8. "Mom, Dad" – 2:40
9. "On Broadway" (Barry Mann, Cynthia Weil, Jerry Leiber, Mike Stoller) – 3:37
10. "Caroline" – 2:16
11. "I Just Can't Be Lonesome No More" – 2:46

== Personnel ==
- Livingston Taylor — Acoustic guitar, guitar, piano, keyboards, vocals
- Greg Prestopino — Vocals, backing vocals
- Robert Popwell — Bass, guitar
- Walter Robinson — Bass, acoustic bass
- Johnny Sandlin — Bass, guitar
- Bill Stewart — Drums
- Tommy Talton — Acoustic guitar, guitar
- David Woodford — Flute, tenor saxophone, wind
- George Marino — Mastering engineer
