= Man's Best Friend (Livingston Taylor album) =

Studio album by Livingston Taylor
- Released: 1980
- Recorded: 1979–1980
- Genre: Adult contemporary
- Length: 30:53
- Label: Epic
- Producers: Jeff Baxter; John Boylan

Livingston Taylor chronology
Echoes (1979)	Man's Best Friend (1980)	Life Is Good (1988)

Man's Best Friend is American singer-songwriter Livingston Taylor's sixth album, and fifth original album, released in 1980.

Record World called the single "First Time Love" an "upbeat ballad of innocent romance."

== Track listing ==
1. "Ready, Set, Go" – (Jeff Baxter, Taylor, David Wofert)
2. "Dance With Me" – (John Hall, Joanna Hall)
3. "First Time Love" – (Pat Alger, Peter Kaminsky)
4. "Sunshine Girl" – (John Manchester, Taylor)
5. "You Don't Have To Choose" – (Jeff Baxter, Taylor)
6. "Dancing in the Street" – (William "Mickey" Stevenson, Marvin Gaye, Ivy Hunter)
7. "Out Of This World" – (Maggie Taylor, Taylor)
8. "Face Like Dog" – (John Manchester, Taylor)
9. "Pajamas" – (Maggie Taylor, Taylor)
10. "Marie" – (Randy Newman)

== Personnel ==
- Livingston Taylor – Vocals, background vocals, guitars
- Jeff Baxter, Larry Carlton, Steve Cropper – Guitars
- Paulinho Da Costa, Victor Feldman – Percussion
- Scott Edwards, Neil Stubenhaus – Bass guitar
- Tom Funderbunk – Background vocals
- Ed Greene, Russ Kunkel, Jeff Porcaro, Rick Shlosser – Drums
- Howard Kaylan – Background vocals
- Tom Kelly – Background vocals
- Don Henley – Background vocals
- Carla Thomas – Background vocals
- Mark Volman – Background vocals

== Charts ==
Singles

Year	Single	Chart	Position
1980	"First Time Love"	Billboard Hot 100	38
