= Sister Kate (album) =

Studio album by Kate Taylor
- Released: January 1971
- Recorded: 1970
- Studio: Sunset Sound and Crystal Sound, Los Angeles
- Genre: Rock
- Length: 38:37
- Label: Cotillion
- Producer: Peter Asher

Kate Taylor chronology
Sister Kate (1971)	Kate Taylor (1978)

Professional ratings
Review scores
Source	Rating
Christgau's Record Guide	C−

Sister Kate is singer Kate Taylor's first album, released in 1971.

The album features versions of songs by a number of different artists, including "Where You Lead" and "Home Again" which also appeared on Carole King's Tapestry album that same year, as well as two songs which had been recently been covered by Rod Stewart: "Handbags and Gladrags" and "Country Comfort". "Country Comfort" and "Ballad of a Well Known Gun" are two Elton John/Bernie Taupin compositions. The album also features a composition by Taylor's brother Livingston and two by brother James.

Sister Kate peaked at number 88 on the Billboard charts.

== Track listing ==
Side One

1. "Home Again" (Carole King) – 2:18
2. "Ballad of a Well Known Gun" (Elton John, Bernie Taupin) – 4:42
3. "Be That Way" (Livingston Taylor) – 2:51
4. "Handbags and Gladrags" (Mike d'Abo) – 3:25
5. "You Can Close Your Eyes" (James Taylor) – 2:34
6. "Look at Granny Run, Run" (Jerry Ragovoy, Mort Shuman) – 2:49

Side Two

1. "Where You Lead" (Carole King, Toni Stern) – 2:27
2. "White Lightning" (Jape Richardson) – 2:40
3. "Country Comfort" (Elton John, Bernie Taupin) – 3:39
4. "Lo and Behold/Jesus Is Just All Right" (James Taylor, A. Reid Reynolds) – 2:22
5. "Do I Still Figure in Your Life" (Pete Dello) – 2:19
6. "Sweet Honesty" (Beverley Martyn) – 6:31

== Personnel ==
- Kate Taylor as Sister Kate – vocals, clapping
- Peter Asher – vocals, backing vocals, clapping
- John Beland – guitar
- Merry Clayton – vocals, backing vocals, background music
- Sandra Crouch – percussion, tambourine
- Oma Drake – vocals, backing vocals, background music
- Abigale Haness – vocals
- Gail Haness – backing vocals, background music
- John Hartford – banjo
- Carole King – piano, vocals, backing vocals, string arrangements, background music
- Danny Kortchmar – guitar, percussion, conga, backing vocals
- Russ Kunkel – drums
- Charles Larkey – bass
- Bernie Leadon – guitar
- The Memphis Horns – horn, horn arrangements
  - Wayne Jackson – horn, horn arrangements
  - Andrew Love – horn, horn arrangements
- Joel O'Brian – drums
- Donna Prater – vocals, backing vocals
- Linda Ronstadt – vocals, backing vocals, background music
- Ralph Schuckett – organ, piano, accordion, keyboards
- Leland Sklar – bass
- JD Souther – guitar, vocals, clapping
- John Tartaglia – strings, string arrangements
- James Taylor – guitar
