= Good Friends (Livingston Taylor album) =

Studio album by Livingston Taylor
- Released: 1993
- Recorded: April 16–17, 1993
- Studio: MasterSound, Queens, NY
- Genre: Pop, Folk, Jazz
- Length: 46:52
- Label: Chesky Records
- Producer: David Chesky, Joel Diamond

Livingston Taylor chronology
Our Turn to Dance (1993)	Good Friends (1993)	Unsolicited Material (1994)

Good Friends is singer-songwriter Livingston Taylor's ninth album, released in 1993.

The album is full of skillfully crafted pop songs and classics with a jazzy twist. Taylor includes several cover songs along with his own, self-penned, material. His cover of Bill Withers' "Grandma's Hands" takes the original's simple arrangement (just a bluesy electric guitar, bass and drums behind Wither's voice) and recreates the song into a gospel-choir backed a cappella performance. Based on the lyrics, the Grandma of this song was a religious woman who “clapped in church on Sunday morning” and “played a tambourine so well.” He also tackles the Wizard of Oz selections, "If I Only Had a Brain" and "Somewhere Over the Rainbow". Keeping with the Chesky Records standards, as the back-cover reads, this album was "recorded with minimalist miking techniques and without overdubbing or artificial enhancement to ensure the purest and most natural sound possible."

== Track listing ==
All tracks composed by Livingston Taylor, except where indicated.

1. "Out of This World" (Livingston Taylor, Maggie Taylor) – 2:45
2. "Jacques Cousteau" (Andy Paley) – 2:17
3. "Heart and Soul" (Hoagy Charmichael, Frank Loesser) – 2:42
4. "Carolina Day" – 3:43
5. "If I Only Had a Brain" (Harold Arlen, E.Y. Harburg) – 4:18
6. "Grandma's Hands" (Bill Withers) – 1:45
7. "Blind" – 3:16
8. "Good Friends" – 3:54
9. "Pajamas" – 2:18
10. "Get Out of Bed" (Livingston Taylor, Maggie Taylor) – 2:57
11. "Save Your Heart for Me" (Gary Geld, Peter Udell) – 2:43
12. "Fifth and Vine" – 2:46
13. "Bluer Than Blue" (Randy Goodrum) – 2:55
14. "In My Reply" – 3:46
15. "Somewhere over the Rainbow" (Harold Arlen, E.Y. Harburg) – 3:40
16. "Thank You Song" – 1:13

== Formats ==
CD (JD097) Chesky Records
180 gram LP (JR97) Chesky Records
