= Iron Horse Music Hall =

Music venue in Northampton, Massachusetts

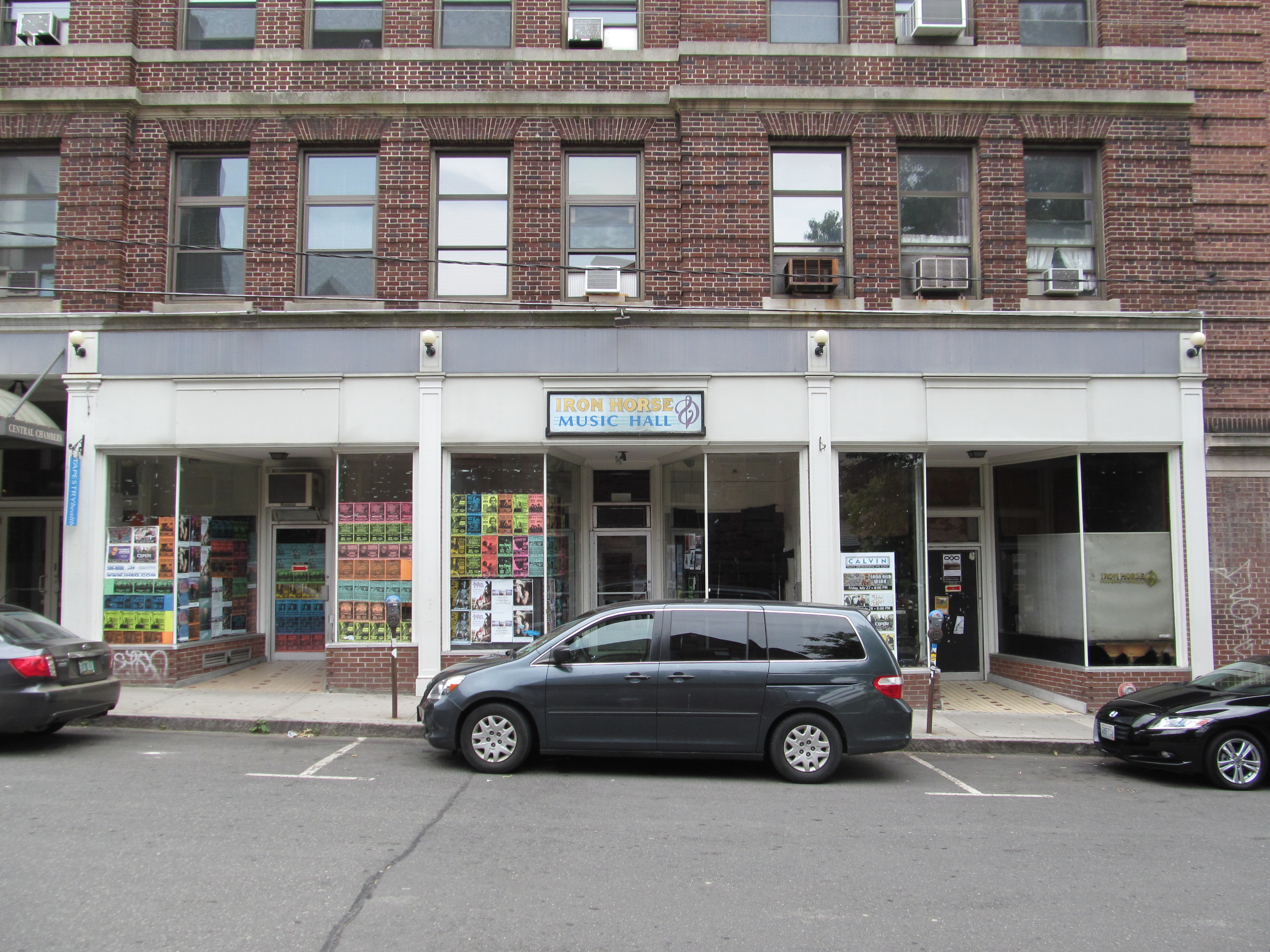
- Iron Horse Music Hall in 2012
- Interactive map of Iron Horse Music Hall
- Address: 18 Center St. Northampton, Massachusetts; United States
- Coordinates: 42°19′8.7″N 72°37′54″W
- Owner: The Parlor Room Collective
- Type: Club

Construction
- Opened: February 24, 1979

Website
- ironhorse.org

The Iron Horse Music Hall is a music venue located in Northampton, Massachusetts, west of Boston and north of Springfield, Massachusetts. Its motto is Music Alone Shall Live. The night club showcases a wide variety of musical genres and performing artists in past years, including artists such as Richie Havens, Leo Kottke, Janis Ian, Livingston Taylor, Duke Robillard, Ellis Paul and Vance Gilbert.

== History ==
Jordi Herold and John Riley opened the club on February 24, 1979, as a bohemian cafe with 85 seats. The club (doubled in size in the late 1980s) is home to many kinds of music and talent ranging from popular local performers to artists of international repute. In college, Herold fantasized about opening a club and placed a bid on space in Amherst. After limited initial success, he began teaching for the Amherst, Massachusetts public school system.

John Riley was responsible for bringing the first jazz shows into the club. In the early years of operation, music was really a complement to the room's ambiance as opposed to the main event, live music was limited to a strict format of classical chamber music (Thursdays), jazz (Fridays), and folk and classical (Saturdays), and the talent was mostly local. The club gained recognition when national acts Dave Van Ronk and the Heath Brothers played the club during its first year.

By 1982, musical performers played the Horse on a regular basis, with many performers being nationally known or critically renowned artists. Some now well known acts such as Suzanne Vega, Stanley Jordan, George Winston, Michelle Shocked, Tracy Chapman, Dar Williams, Northampton-area native Sonya Kitchell and comedian Steven Wright performed at the Iron Horse before they became nationally known artists. The lineup of musicians has also included legendary reggae group Toots & the Maytals, Michael Franti, pop-rock icon John Mayer, monster guitarist Jorma Kaukonen (a founding member of Jefferson Airplane), pioneering free-jazz pianist Cecil Taylor, jazz pianist Mose Allison, folk-blues legend Taj Mahal, alternative-rock band They Might Be Giants, psychedelic-folk act The Incredible String Band, rock musician Jesse Malin, folk-rocker Steve Forbert, Chicago blues guitarist Jimmy Dawkins, children's musician Mister G, the Five Blind Boys of Alabama, and rapper George Watsky. The Iron Horse closed for a time in the 1990s, but was eventually reopened.

The venue was shuttered in March 2020 at the start of the COVID pandemic and as of early 2023.

At its February 14, 2023 meeting, the Northampton License Commission told Eric Suher, the owner The Iron Horse Music Hall, that it would cancel the liquor license for the venue if it was not reopened by June 1.

In September 2023, The Parlor Room, Inc., the non-profit operator of the Parlor Room music venue, announced that they had signed an agreement to acquire The Iron Horse and reopen it. After a significant renovation the venue reopened on May 15, 2024.
