= Livingston Taylor (album) =

Studio album by Livingston Taylor
- Released: 1970
- Genre: Rock
- Length: 28:31
- Label: Capricorn
- Producer: Jon Landau

Livingston Taylor chronology
Livingston Taylor (1970)	Liv (1971)

Professional ratings
Review scores
Source	Rating
Allmusic	3/5 stars

Livingston Taylor is American singer-songwriter Livingston Taylor's first album, released in 1970. Its eleven tracks include ten of Taylor's own compositions, and one cover version of the Earl Greene and Carl Montgomery country standard "Six Days on the Road".

The album contains the song "Carolina Day", an original, personal song that helped set the tone for Taylor's intimate, laid-back musical style.

Livingston Taylor peaked at number 82 on the Billboard charts.

== Track listing ==
All tracks composed by Livingston Taylor; except where indicated

1. "Sit on Back" – 2:22
2. "Doctor Man" – 2:56
3. "Six Days on the Road" (Earl Greene, Carl Montgomery) – 2:36
4. "Packet of Good Times" – 3:04
5. "Hush a Bye" – 2:38
6. "Carolina Day" – 3:08
7. "Can't Get Back Home" – 2:25
8. "In My Reply" – 2:50
9. "Lost in the Love of You" – 3:00
10. "Good Friends" – 3:01
11. "Thank You Song" – 1:09

== Personnel ==
- Livingston Taylor — Acoustic guitar, guitar, keyboards, vocals
- Pete Carr — Guitar
- Paul Hornsby — Organ, piano, keyboards, vibraphone
- Robert Popwell — Bass, guitar
- Johnny Sandlin — Bass, drums
