= Carmen Saeculare =

Latin hymn by Horace

The Carmen saeculare ("Song of the ages") is a Latin hymn written by Horace and commissioned by Augustus. It was sung by a choir of girls and boys at the secular games in 17 BC. It is written in Sapphic meter and follows the themes of the poets of the day, in particular Vergil.

The poem is a prayer dedicated to Diana and Apollo, and secondarily to Jupiter and Juno. It asks for their protection of Rome and its laws, as well as their favor in granting descendants to the Roman people. For Horace, prosperity and wealth returned to the city after Augustus took power and established peace. Making references to Aeneas and Romulus, he celebrates the reign of Augustus, which brought in a new era and ensured the future of Rome.

This poem marked Horace's return to lyrical poetry and raised him to the level of national poet.

== History ==
=== The secular games of 17 BC ===
After his return from the east in 19 BC, Augustus established laws regarding the family and adultery. He then held celebration of the secular games in 17 BC. These celebrations were to be held every saeculum, or the maximum human lifespan, which Romans considered to be one hundred or one hundred and ten years. But the term was interpreted more generally to denote an era and were not held at a regular period. It is difficult to find evidence for a continuing tradition. The games were celebrated with a song in 294 BC during the First Punic War and later in the 140s. Soon before the Augustan secular games, a tradition was supposedly discovered in ancient texts, dating back to 456 BC, with a period of 110 years (which would make the correct date 16 BC). However, it is not certain that these texts were authentic or partly composed to provide a reason for holding a celebration in that year.

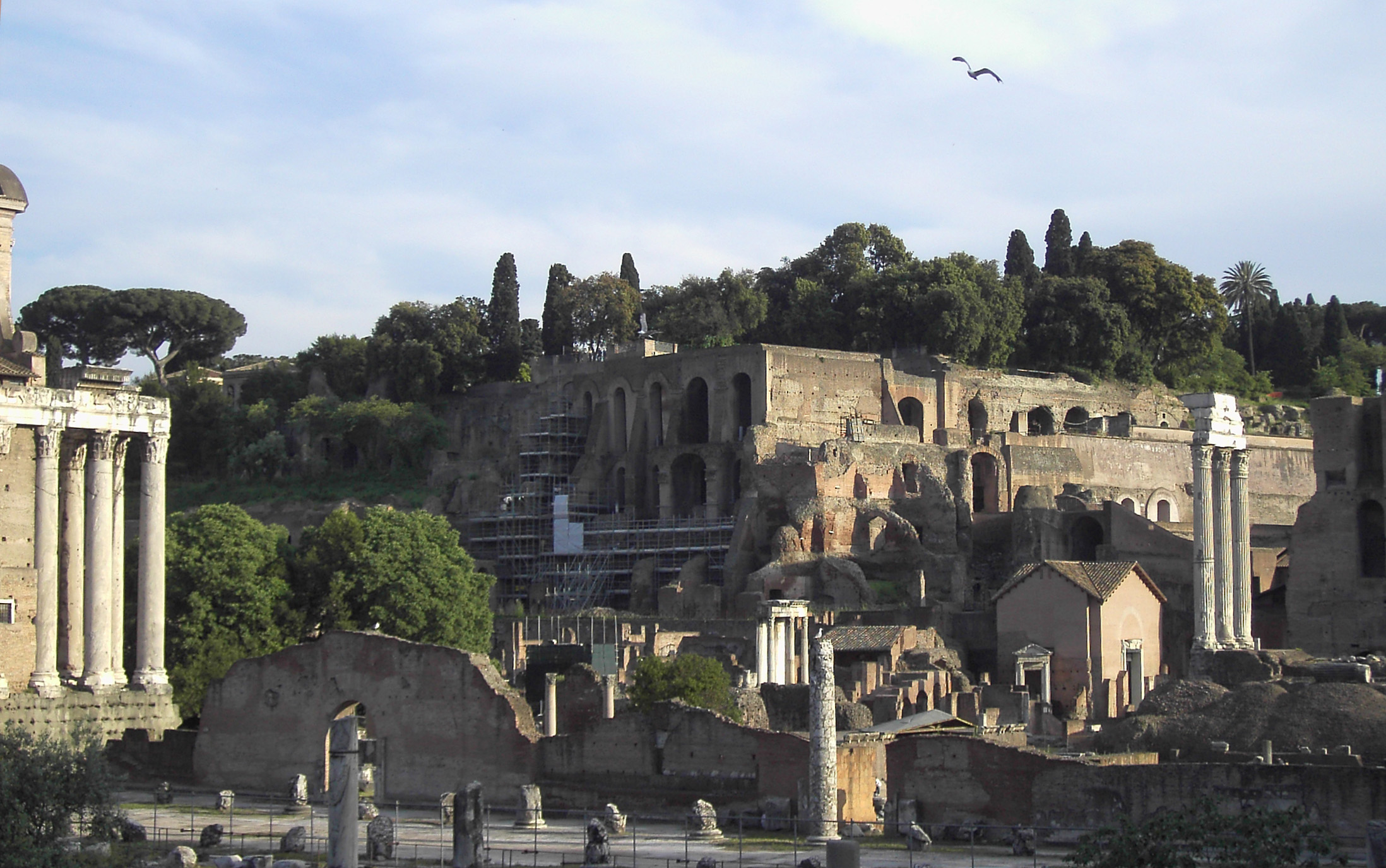
Palatine Hill seen from the Roman Forum.

We know about the games of 17 BC from descriptions by Phlegon and Zosimus, the latter passing on the sibylline oracle which supposedly instituted the ritual. This information is supplemented by an epigraphic document, the commentarium ludorum saecularium, a record of the ceremonies. Originally, the celebrations, dedicated to Dis Pater and Proserpine, were held over three nights; in Augustus' time, the quindecimviri added daytime ceremonies. Sacrifices were shared between Augustus and Agrippa. On the first night, from May 31 to June 1, 17 B.C., sacrifices were made to the Fates on the banks of the Tiber. The following day saw a sacrifice to Jupiter on the Capitoline Hill, likely at the Temple of Jupiter Optimus Maximus. On the second night, gifts were offered to Ilithyia, and during the day, a sacrifice was made to Juno on the Capitol. Finally, on the third night, a sow is sacrificed to Mother Earth; during the day, offerings are made to Apollo and Diana on the Palatine. After the last offering, Horace's poem was performed.

The poem was commissioned by Augustus for the secular games. Horace's initial relationship with Augustus was facilitated by Gaius Maecenas, to whom he was introduced by Vergil and Varius. Maecenas at first figured highly in Horace's poetry, but his significance diminished in Horace's later writings. This is likely due to Horace becoming closer to Augustus, with whom he was quite close. While Augustus commissioned the poem and influenced its subject matter, Horace maintained a degree of artistic independence.

=== Performance and publication ===
The Carmen saeculare is unique in the knowledge the circumstances surrounding its performance. According to Alessandro Barchiesi, it is "the only surviving poem in Latin of which we know time and place of a choral performance, and independent evidence confirms that this definitely happened". The proceedings were recorded with the following inscription:

Sacrificio perfecto puer. [X]XVII quibus denuntiatum erat patrimi et matrimi et puellae totidem
carmen cecinerunt; eo[de]m modo in Capitolio.
Carmen composuit Q. Hor[at]ius Flaccus

With the sacrifice completed, 27 boys and the same number of girls known to have their mothers and fathers sung a song, and again on the Capitoline. The song was written by Q. Horatius Flaccus.

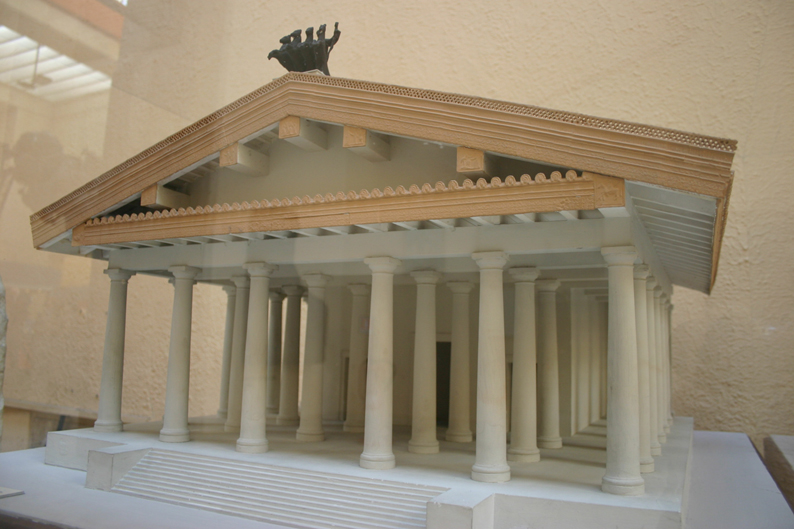
Reconstruction of the Temple of Jupiter Optimus Maximus, where the hymn may have been performed.

The poem was recited by a mixed choir, i.e. composed of both boys and girls, which was very rare in the Greek choral tradition, and the Sibylline oracle suggested that for certain parts of the poem, the singing would be done by only the boys or girls. The suggested allotments vary, but one proposed by Peter L. Schmidt is the following:

- Full chorus: stanzas 1, 2 and 19;
- Boys: stanza 3; verses 33-34 in stanza 9; stanzas 10-14, and 16-17;
- Girls: stanzas 4-8; verses 35-36 in stanza 9; and stanzas 15 and 18.

The poem was performed at the Temple of Apollo Palatinus. It may also have been performed at the Temple of Jupiter Optimus Maximus, either in procession or a second time. The poem's performance was separate from the religious celebrations and ceremonies of the secular games, and was sung once they had been completed. It was also published as a separate work from Horace's Odes, instead of in their fourth book, which followed the performance by several years.

=== Structure ===
The poem is made up of 19 stanzas in sapphic meter, or 76 verses. This meter is the simplest used by Horace in his lyric poems, making it easier for the chorus and audience to understand and remember.

Jacques Perret proposed the following structure for the poem's stanzas:

- the first 3 stanzas to Apollo and Diana
- the next 5 for the nocturnal divinities (Lucina or Ilithyia, the Parcae and Tellus)
- the next stanza to Apollo and Diana
- the next six to the capitoline divinities
- the next three to Apollo and Diana
- the final stanza to "Jupiter deique cuncti" (Jupiter and all the gods)

Eduard Fraenkel, following Johannes Vahlen and Theodor Mommsen divides the poem into two halves, separated by line 37. The first half concerns the "physical conditions of Rome's welfare", and its moral and political aspects are addressed in the second half.

Finally, Michael Putnam describes the first and ninth stanzas as "fram[ing] the ode's initial half", with their mentions of Apollo and Diana beginning and ending it.

=== Influences ===
The Carmen saeculare follows the tradition of the Greek paean, an essentially religious genre of poetry, of which the Carmen is the first known imitation in Latin. The paean mainly invokes Apollo and, to a lesser extent, Artemis, with a number of other deities also present. There are several recurrent themes: prophecy, divine justice, rituals and sacrifices. With a complex meter, it was sung at religious festivals, mainly by young men. The genre reached its highest level with poets such as Pindar in the 5th century B.C., whose sixth Paean has much in common with the Carmen saeculare.

Horace also took inspiration from Latin poetry. The Carmen saeculare shares themes with and has a style similar to the poems of Catullus, Vergil and Tibullus. Catullus and Tibullus both wrote poems dedicated to or invoking Apollo, and Vergil's Aeneid is directly alluded to.

== Interpretations ==
=== As a religious hymn ===
The Latin word carmen, related to the word cano (literally "I sing"), denoted a poem, song or incantation: all these aspects of the word are found in the Carmen.

==== Deities of light ====
Apollo and Diana occupy a prime place in the poem: named at the beginning and the end, but also throughout the poem, they frame it and form its structure. The aspect of light in these two deities is present in the names which Horace chose for them (Apollo is called Phoebus, i.e. "bright", Diana's name is related to the heavens); and is reinforced by the use of various expressions throughout the poem. Horace also replaces the traditional Hades and Proserpina, who represent darkness, and mentions night only once.

=== As a political poem ===
The Carmen places emphasis on Augustus' power and his connection to the gods. It also celebrates many of the new laws which Augustus put into place. However, Augustus himself is not directly mentioned in the poem, only indirectly once as the descendant of Anchises and Venus.

== Legacy ==
Horace, after the mixed success encountered by the first three books of his Odes, published in 23 B.C., decided not to write lyric poetry again. Thus it is likely, without being commissioned to write the Carmen saeculare, Horace would not have composed the fourth book of his Odes, several years later, and would have followed through with his decision to cease to write lyric poetry altogether.

=== Later mentions ===
Like other poems of Horace, manuscripts from different eras show that the Carmen saeculare continued to be read well after it was written. It is known through medieval manuscripts and was occasionally cited by grammarians of late antiquity. It was also imitated by Conrad Celtes who composed a poem of the same name.

The poem has twice been set to music:

- In the Middle ages is found a neume for the Carmen saeculare.
- A version first performed at the Freemasons' Hall in London, written by François-André Danican Philidor.

Voltaire wrote that "Horace's secular poem is one of the most beautiful pieces of antiquity". A section of the poem was inscribed on the Arch of the Philaeni, a triumphal arch built in 1937 by Fascist Italy in colonial Libya.

== See also ==
- Occasional poetry
- Secular hymn (genre)

== Sources ==
- Agbamu, Samuel (2024). Restorations of Empire in Africa: Ancient Rome and Modern Italy's African Colonies. Oxford, UK: Oxford University Press. doi:10.1093/9780191943805.001.0001. ISBN 978-0-19-194380-5.
- Barchiesi, A. (2002) "The Uniqueness of the Carmen Saeculare and its Tradition", in Feeney, D.; Woodman, T. (eds.) Traditions and Contexts in the Poetry of Horace. Cambridge University Press
- Beard, M.; North, J; Price, S. (1998) Religious of Rome: Volume 1, A History. Cambridge University Press
- Fraenkel, E. (1966) Horace. Oxford: Clarendon Press
- Friis-Jensen, K. (2007) "The reception of Horace in the Middle Ages", in Harrison, S. (ed.) The Cambridge Companion to Horace (1st ed.). Cambridge University Press, pp. 291-304
- Lewis, A.-M. (2023) Celestial Inclinations (1st ed.). Oxford University Press
- Lowrie, M. (2007) "Horace and Augustus", in Harrison, S. (ed.) The Cambridge Companion to Horace. Cambridge University Press, pp. 77-90
- Lowrie, M. (2009) Writing, Performance and Authority in Augustan Rome (1st ed.). Oxford University Press
- McDonald, G. (2022) "Before Melopoiae: Conrad Celtis, Laurentius Corvinus, Arnold Wöstefeld and the Use of Music in the Teaching and Performance of Horace's Metres around 1500", in Enenkel, K. and Laureys, M. (eds.) Horace across the Media. Brill, pp. 335-398
- Perret, J. (1964) Horace. New York University Press
- Pirenne-Delforge V. and Scheid J. (2023) "Archives of piety: ritual norms and authority between Greece and Rome", in Cheng A. and Stéphane F. (eds.) All about the Rites: From Canonised Ritual to Ritualised Society. Paris: Collège de France, pp. 412-421
- Putnam, M. (2001) Horace's "Carmen Saeculare": Ritual Magic and the Poet's Art. Yale University Press
- Schmidt, P. (2009) "Horace's Century Poem: A Processional Song?", in Lowrie, M. (ed.) Horace: Odes and Epodes. Oxford University Press, pp. 122-140
- Tarrant, R. (2020) Horace's Odes. Oxford University Press
- Voltaire, F.M.A. (1764) "Oraison, prière publique, action de grâce, etc", in Dictionnaire philosophique
- Zosimus (1814) New History. Translated by W. Green and T. Chaplin. London
