= Hymn (James Taylor song) =

Single by James Taylor

from the album One Man Dog
- B-side: "Fanfare"
- Released: 1973
- Studio: A & R Recording
- Genre: Folk rock
- Length: 2:24
- Label: Warner Bros.
- Songwriter: James Taylor
- Producer: Peter Asher

James Taylor singles chronology
"One Man Parade" (1973)	"Hymn" (1973)	"Let It All Fall Down" (1974)

"Hymn" is a song written by James Taylor that was originally released on his 1973 album One Man Dog. It was subsequently released as the B-side of the single "One Man Parade" and later released as the A-side of a single backed by Taylor's song "Fanfare". The single did not chart.

== Background ==
Both "Hymn" and "Fanfare" were part of a suite of short songs on side 2 of the album. Both songs were recorded at A&R Studios in New York.

Musicologist James Perone finds the song to be "interesting," particularly with its relationship to Taylor's life and certain Beatles influences. Perone describes three distinct sections as having three different themes, all related to people trying to influence him: first religious zealots, second stoned-out drug users, and finally the love of a woman which really frees his soul. Perone points out that the love of a woman likely references Simon, who he had recently married. Perone finds Beatles influence in that it has thematic similarities to John Lennon's recent solo song "God." According to Perone, both "God" and "Hymn" "[reference] the style of gospel music." Donald Langis of L'Evangeline regarded the song as being semi-religious with lines such as "Let the winter wind blow/Where will we hide when it comes from inside?"

About his affinity for hymns, Taylor has said:

Hymns and carols, they are just basically a foundational education, they are what a whole lot of Western music is based on. I grew up in a very non-religious household, and it wasn't till I went away to school and got exposed to this stuff that I learned all of these hymns. They were an education to me: the harmonies, the chord structures, the way they progressed it. It's basically Western Music 101. I learned to play them on the guitar out of boredom, but they basically gave me a foundation for music.

Taylor later wrote a song "New Hymn" in collaboration with Reynolds Price, which Newsday critic Jim Feldman described as "a hushed plea for social commitment."

== Reception ==
Billboard described "Hymn" as "folksy-gospel arrangement in the best Taylor traditional, featuring strong piano with the singers voice taking the spotlight." Cash Box called it a "pop oriented single certain to gain immediate top 40 acceptance across the country." Record World said that "'Mr. Mellow' gets a boost from a horn section that should help disc get across-the-board attention." Rolling Stone critic Jon Landau rated "Hymn" as the best song on One Man Dog, calling attention to the line "As a man and a woman stand alone in the light/Give us reason to be, like the sun on the sea." Berwyn Life critic Steve Sparacio described the song as "lyrical." Calgary Herald critic Jim Rennie said that although many of the songs on One Man Dog are "bits and pieces", "Hymn" is a "substantial enough composition" that has "the same soft, fluid, country flavor that almost all of Taylor's songs contain."

Despite the critical praise, the single failed to chart.

== Personnel ==
- James Taylor – lead vocals, acoustic guitar
- Danny Kortchmar – electric guitar
- Leland Sklar – bass
- Craig Doerge – piano
- Russ Kunkel – drums
- Michael Brecker – tenor saxophone, soprano saxophone
- Randy Brecker – trumpet, flugelhorn, piccolo trumpet
- Barry Rogers – trombone
- Art Baron – bass trombone
