= Isaac M. Taylor =

American physician (1921–1996)

- Born: Isaac Montrose Taylor; June 15, 1921; Morganton, North Carolina
- Died: November 3, 1996 (aged 75)
- Spouses: Gertrude Woodard; Suzanne Francis Sheats
- Children: 8, including Alex, James, Kate, and Livingston

Isaac Montrose Taylor (June 15, 1921 – November 3, 1996) was an American physician and academic who served as dean of the Medical School of the University of North Carolina from 1964 until 1971.

== Early life ==
Taylor was born in Morganton, North Carolina. He received his undergraduate degree from the University of North Carolina at Chapel Hill and his doctor of medicine from Harvard University. He served as the chief resident at Massachusetts General Hospital. He then joined the faculty of the University of North Carolina Medical School before serving as dean for ten years.

In 1955, he joined the United States Navy and became a medical officer. In 1957, he was a lieutenant commander and was a bacteriologist at McMurdo Station in Antarctica for Operation Deep Freeze.

== Personal life ==
His first marriage to Gertrude Woodard produced five children who all became professional musicians:

- Alex Taylor (1947)
- James Vernon Taylor (1948)
- Kate Taylor (1949)
- Livingston Taylor (1950)
- Hugh Taylor (1952).

Through his second marriage to Suzanne Francis Sheats, he fathered three more children:

- Andrew Preston Taylor (1983)
- Theodore Haynes Taylor (1986)
- Julia Rose Taylor (1989).

== See also ==
- Charles H. Taylor (publisher)
- John I. Taylor
