= There You Are Again =

There You are Again

Studio album by Livingston Taylor
- Released: January 24, 2006
- Genre: Folk, pop
- Length: 48:22
- Label: Whistling Dog Music
- Producer: Glenn Rosenstein

Livingston Taylor chronology
Snapshot: Live at the Iron Horse (1999)	There You are Again (2006)	Last Alaska Moon (2010)

There You Are Again is an album by American singer-songwriter Livingston Taylor released by Whistling Dog Music on January 24, 2006. It ended a nine-year hiatus since his previous studio album. Glenn Rosenstein produced There You Are Again.

Tell Jesus (To Come to My House), one of the songs on the album, has been explained as follows:

The concept is about a guy who can't move and is in so much [pain] that he isn't going to church. I really struggled with the words "tell Jesus" because I wondered if it should be "ask Jesus." But that character needed Jesus to come to him—the opening lays it out—since he can't move or get out of the chair. I just had a great time creating that character!

== Track listing ==
All lyrics are written by Livingston Taylor; all music is composed by Livingston Taylor

No.	Title	Length
1.	"Best of Friends"	4:05
2.	"There I'll Be"	3:21
3.	"Yes"	3:39
4.	"My Baby Don't Mind"	4:38
5.	"Step by Step"	5:47
6.	"There You Are Again"	3:18
7.	"Tuesday's Lullaby"	4:56
8.	"Tell Jesus (To Come to My House)"	4:46
9.	"Blame It on Me"	3:51
10.	"My Perfect Christmas Day"	3:44
11.	"Wish I Were a Cowboy"	2:35
12.	"You're the Boss of Me"	3:39
Total length:		48:22
