= One Morning in May (folk song) =

Folk song from England

"One Morning in May" (Roud 140, Laws P14) is an English folk song which has been collected from traditional singers in England and the USA and has also been recorded by revival singers. Through the use of double-entendre, at least in the English versions, it tells of an encounter between a grenadier (or soldier) and a lady.

Lyrics have been traced to the late 17th or early 18th century. There are a number of textual variants, and the song has many titles. The most frequent in the Roud Index are "The Nightingale", "The Bold Grenadier", and "One Morning in May", in that order.

== Synopsis ==
The narrator sees a beautiful young woman walking with a soldier, often a grenadier. They walk on together to the side of a stream, and sit down to hear the nightingale sing. The grenadier puts his arm around the young woman's waist and takes a fiddle out of his knapsack. He plays the young woman a tune, and she remarks on the nightingale's song:

Then with kisses and compliments he took her round the middle,
And out of his knapsack he drawed forth a fiddle,
And he played her such a fine tune as made the groves and valleys ring,
Oh 'tis "Hark, hark" says the fair maid "How the nightingales sing".
(Collected by H.E.D.Hammond from William Bartlett in Wimborne Union (workhouse), Dorset, 1905)

He says it's time to "give o'er", but she asks him to play another tune, saying she loves the touch of his string. In many versions she asks him to marry her, but he usually says he has a wife at home. He says if he returns it will be in the spring, to hear the nightingale sing.

In a version commonly sung in English folk clubs there is a chorus which is also sung in versions by The Spinners and The Dubliners: :

And they kissed so sweet and comforting as they clung to each other.
They went arm in arm along the road like sister and brother,
They went arm in arm along the road till they came to a stream,
And they both sat down together, love, to hear the nightingale sing.

This is similar to a chorus found in a version called the "Soldier and the Lady" collected from Frederick and Raymond Cantwell of Standlake, Oxfordshire by Peter Kennedy in 1956.

In an Arkansas version, "The Irish Soldier And The English Lady" sung by Neil Morris and recorded by Alan Lomax, the singer specifies that the soldier plays "The Old Concord" and "A Shamrock of Erin". He also tells us where the soldier is going:

"Goodbye," said the soldier with a parting caress.
"Tomorrow I'm going to the throne of Queen Bess,"

== History ==
=== Published versions ===
"The Souldier (sic) and His Knapsack", registered with the Stationers Company in 1639 may be this song, but as Steve Roud and Julia Childs point out "soldiers and knapsacks are a rather common pairing". The earliest known text is a Broadside ballad titled "The nightingale's song: or The soldier's rare musick, and maid's recreation" published between 1689 and 1709 by W Onley of London, in the Bodleian Ballad Collection. This text has a pious moral at the end which both later publishers and traditional singers dispensed with.

The New Penguin Book of English Folk Songs has a version titled "Water Rattle" sung by Arthur Howard in 1981 and recorded by Ian Russell.

Lyrics appeared in 1927 in The American Songbag by Carl Sandburg, having come through Gilbert Raynolds Combs. Those lyrics are used by Bill Keith and Jim Rooney, by James Taylor on his 1972 album One Man Dog, and by The Country Gentlemen on their eponymous 1973 album.

=== Collecting ===
The Roud Folk Song Index lists 90 examples of this song collected from the USA, 14 from Canada and 41 from England. The song doesn't seem to have been collected from traditional singers in Scotland or Ireland.

== Recordings ==
=== Field recordings ===
A version by Suffolk singer Charlie Carver, recorded ca. 1960 in The Gardeners Arms, Tostock, Suffolk, England, by Desmond Herring is in the British Library Sound Archive.

Sheffield singer Frank Hinchliffe recorded the song in 1977.

A recording of Luke Stanley singing "The Bold Grenadier" was made in 1954 at Barrow on Humber, Lincolnshire by Alan Lomax, who also recorded Neil Morris at Timbo, Stone County, Arkansas, in 1959. Jimmy Driftwood, Neil Morris' son, also recorded the song as did Almeda Riddle.

=== Old time/country recordings ===
- Coon Creek Girls, 'Early Radio Favorites', Old Homestead OHCS 142, "The Soldier and the Lady"
- Jean Ritchie, 'Songs from Kentucky', Westminster WP 6037. "One Morning in May"
- Tina Greer; "The Watson Family Tradition"; Rounder Records 11661 0564 2; 1995.

=== Folk revival recordings ===
- A version of the ballad was recorded by 'Gaelic Americana' artist Kyle Carey on a joint EP (released 2013) of the same title with British folk duo Josienne Clarke and Ben Walker.

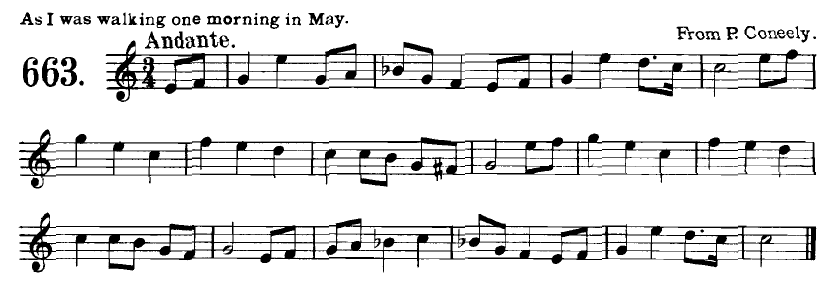
"As I Was Walking One Morning in May"

- A version of the song sung by Isla Cameron is used in the 1967 film Far From the Madding Crowd.
- Another version was recorded as "The Bold Grenadier" by the progressive rock band IQ in 1989 which appeared on the compilation The Lost Attic.

This song was also used in the July 31, 2019 episode of Harlots.

== Tune ==
"As I Was Walking One Morning in May" appears as an Irish air in Stanford's 1905 edition of George Petrie's collection, bearing the attribution "From P. Coneely". Its relation to extant ballads called "One Morning in May" is unclear.
