= Over the Rainbow (Livingston Taylor album) =

Studio album by Livingston Taylor
- Released: 1973
- Recorded: 1973
- Genre: Rock
- Length: 31:29
- Label: Capricorn
- Producer: Ed Freeman

Livingston Taylor chronology
Liv (1971)	Over the Rainbow (1973)	Three Way Mirror (1978)

Over the Rainbow is singer-songwriter Livingston Taylor's third album, released in 1973. Its eleven tracks include nine of his own compositions, as well as two cover versions: "Over the Rainbow", from The Wizard of Oz, and George Harrison's "If I Needed Someone".

Professional ratings
Review scores
Source	Rating
Allmusic	link
Christgau's Record Guide	C

== Track listing ==
All tracks composed by Livingston Taylor, except where indicated.

1. "Loving Be My New Horizon" – 1:45
2. "Pretty Woman" (N. Clafin, Taylor) – 2:31
3. "Falling In Love With You" – 2:23
4. "I Can Dream of You" – 3:02
5. "Blind" – 3:36
6. "Over the Rainbow" (Harold Arlen, E.Y. Harburg) – 2:41
7. "Rodeo" – 2:53
8. "Lady Tomorrow" – 2:41
9. "If I Needed Someone" (George Harrison) – 2:56
10. "Let Me Go Down" – 3:19
11. "Oh Hallelujah" – 3:46

== Personnel ==
- Livingston Taylor – guitar, keyboards, vocals
- Gloria Agostini – harp
- Victor Brady – piano, steel guitar, steel piano
- Neil Larsen, Chuck Leavell – keyboards
- Tony Levin – bass guitar
- Mike Mainieri – percussion, marimba, vibraphone
- George Marge – clarinet, clavinet
- Rick Marotta – drums, percussion
- Howard "Buzz" Feiten, Jim Nalls, Tommy Talton – guitar
- Walter Robinson – bass guitar, acoustic bass
- Carly Simon – vocals
- Maretha Stewart – vocals
- James Taylor – vocals
- Jim Reeves – mix engineer
- Ed Freeman – producer
