= Livingston Taylor =

American singer-songwriter (born 1950)

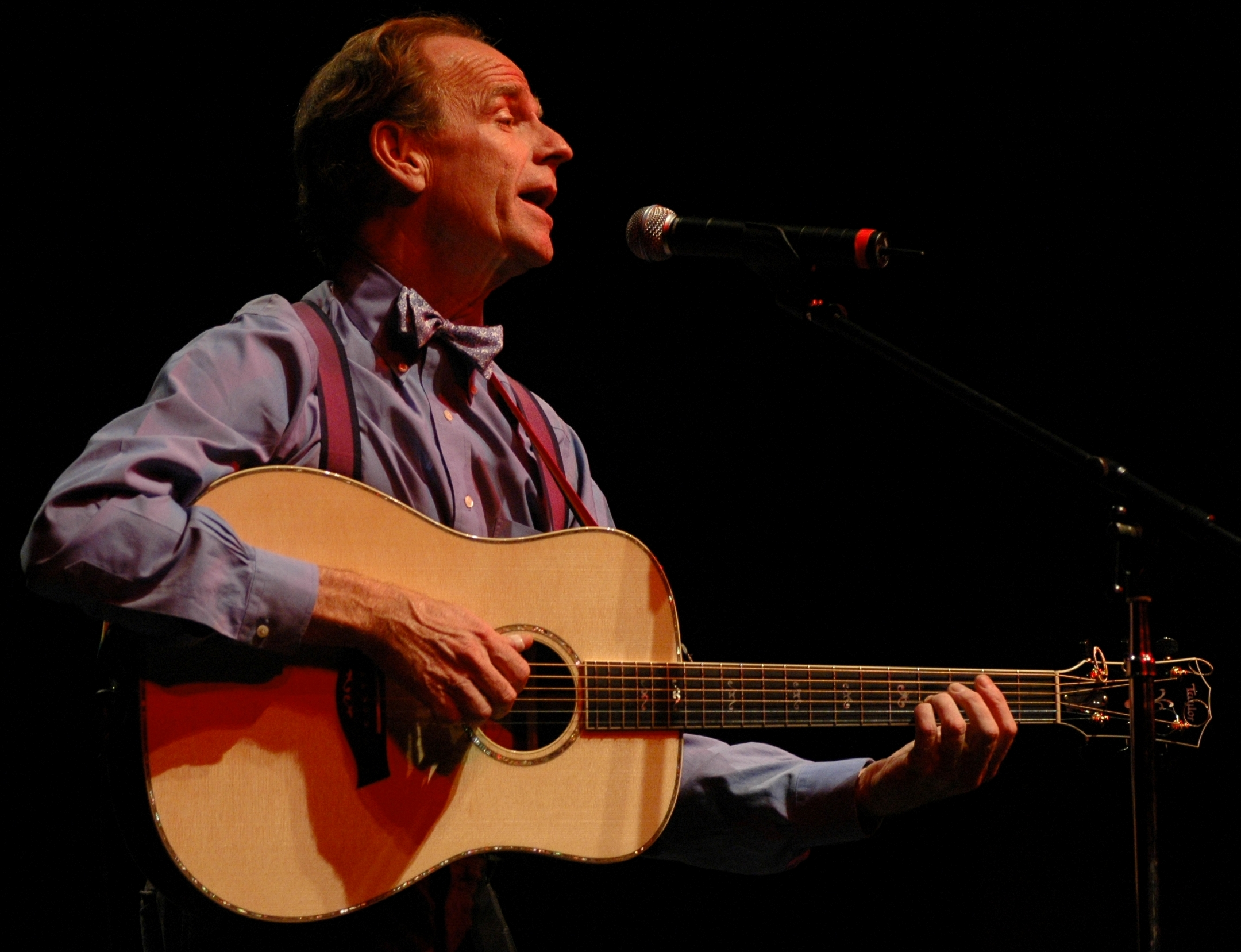
- Taylor at the Broward Performing Arts Center, November 2006

Background information
- Born: November 21, 1950 (age 75); Boston, Massachusetts, U.S.
- Origin: Chapel Hill, North Carolina, U.S.
- Genres: Folk, pop, gospel
- Occupations: Musician, songwriter, performer, professor
- Instruments: Guitar, vocals, banjo, & piano
- Years active: 1970–present
- Labels: Capricorn, Epic, Chesky
- Website: livingstontaylor.com

Livingston Taylor (born November 21, 1950) is an American singer-songwriter and folk musician. Born in Boston and raised in Chapel Hill, North Carolina, he is the brother of singer-songwriter James Taylor, singer-songwriter Kate Taylor, singer Alex Taylor, and singer-innkeeper Hugh Taylor. Taylor is most notable for his Billboard hits "I Will Be In Love With You", "First Time Love", and "I'll Come Running".

He continues to perform nationally and internationally, and has collaborated with Linda Ronstadt, Jimmy Buffett, Jethro Tull, Carly Simon, and his brother James Taylor. He has been a faculty member at Berklee College of Music since 1989.

== Early life ==
Taylor was born to parents Isaac M. "Ike" Taylor and Gertrude "Trudy" Taylor in Boston, Massachusetts. He grew up in North Carolina when his father, a physician, accepted a position at the University of North Carolina at Chapel Hill. His mother had been a student at the Music Conservatory in Boston. He was the fourth of five children, his siblings being Alex (1947–1993), James (born 1948), Kate (born 1949), and Hugh (born 1952).

At an early age, Taylor built a repertoire of folk songs. "From his high chair in the kitchen, little Liv memorized the radio jingle for snuff, chanting 'If your snuff's too strong, it wrong. Get Tuberose.'" His mother, Trudy, recounted that Taylor "was always inventing things". "He and James would make a stringed instrument out of a gourd, or a gut-bucket bass from a broom pole and a washtub, or a flute out of a garden hose, or drums out of cans." Family sing-a-longs took place as a way for Trudy to pass the time while her husband was away. During those early family musical performances, James played cello, Alex played violin, Kate dulcimer, and Livingston banjo. As recounted by James, "We sang African songs, union songs, folk hymns and radio jingles. Lead Belly, Pete Seeger, Woody Guthrie and The Weavers were the records we most listened to. It was their mother, Trudy, who was the catalyst for the children to create their own songs. One day while in the kitchen, she held up a can of vegetables saying: "Why don't you invent an ad jingle about this can of food?" "Alex, James, and Livingston took up their banjo, cello and harmonica and began to improvise some musical sloganeering as Kate and Trudy joined in." These impromptu performances were christened the "kitchen concerts" by Trudy. They would continue until the children were old enough to leave home for their secondary education at boarding schools.

When Livingston was eight, his mother took him and his siblings to Europe, crossing the Atlantic on the New Amsterdam. Their father, Ike, met them in Europe and they all returned home on the Ile De France.

Taylor credits his eldest brother, Alex, for inspiring him, at age 13, to be a musician after Alex returned home one evening having earned $20 performing at a fraternity party. Livingston picked up the guitar and became quite accomplished by age 17.

The Taylor family started vacationing on Martha's Vineyard in the early 1950s, and Livingston has spent every summer there. His parents bought a home there in 1963, and in 1977 Livingston purchased his own 300-square-foot home for $111,000. He refers to the small home as "The Camp".

== Career ==
=== 1960s ===
Taylor began playing music in public for pay in 1963. In Chapel Hill, he was part of a folk trio with guitarist Paul Collins and singer Kim Packer. They covered hits by The Kingston Trio and Peter, Paul and Mary. In junior high he was in a rock group for a short period of time. His first serious attempt at songwriting came in 1966 while he was completing his secondary school education at McLean's Arlington School. He says that that first song, "I'm Searching for a Miracle", was "terrible", but his second attempt, a song titled "Good Friends", became part of his folk setlist for the next four decades.

In 1968, Manny Greenhill, who had managed Joan Baez for a time, got him a booking at a YMCA in Worcester, which led to some shows at Boston University. It was during one of those shows at BU that he had the opportunity to open for Joni Mitchell.

Around this time, producer Jon Landau suggested to Taylor that he approach the Macon, Georgia-based Capricorn Records founded by Phil Walden and Jerry Wexler.

=== 1970s ===
Taylor was one of the first artists to sign with Capricorn Records in 1970. Landau gathered session players Pete Carr (guitar), Paul Hornsby (keyboards), Robert Popwell (bass) and Johnny Sandlin (drums). "We made a lot of the album in Macon, and then we came up to Boston to finish off a few vocals...and then we mixed it in Detroit because Jon was recording an album with a group called MC5." Taylor's debut album, Livingston Taylor, was produced by Landau (who would later produce Bruce Springsteen) and included the song "Carolina Day". "Carolina Day" peaked at No. 93 on the Billboard Top-100 chart. The debut album included ten originals written by Taylor and one cover: "Six Days on the Road" penned by Earl Greene and Carl Montgomery.

By 1970 Taylor's parents, Ike and Trudy, were legally separated. Several of the Taylor children moved north from North Carolina. Livingston and his then-girlfriend Margaret "Maggie" Shea moved into a cottage in Weston, Massachusetts.

The following year, Taylor's second album, Liv, also on Capricorn Records and produced by Landau, was released. It included the song "Get Out of Bed" which peaked at No. 97 on Billboard. Once again, Joe Viglione penned the AllMusic review, stating that "Get Out of Bed" "is a brilliant and exciting slice of pop music" and that "with the understated production of Jon Landau, Livingston's beautiful heartfelt vocals make this an extraordinary work of art."

Taylor's third and final album on Capricorn, Over the Rainbow was released in 1973 and features guest vocalists James Taylor and Carly Simon on his original "Be My New Horizon". In her album review, Denise Sullivan wrote that the title track was "an inspired vocal version" of a song that has been interpreted by many others.

"I Will Be in Love with You"
Sample of Livingston Taylor's "I Will Be in Love with You", originally recorded for Three Way Mirror. The song peaked at No. 30 on the Billboard charts on January 6, 1979.

Taylor left Capricorn Records and released the first of two albums on Epic Records, Three Way Mirror, in 1978. The album featured "I Will Be In Love With You," which peaked at No. 30 on Billboard, and "Going Round One More Time," a song that was later recorded by his brother James Taylor for his 1985 album That's Why I'm Here. Livingston Taylor promoted Three Way Mirror when he toured with Linda Ronstadt as her opening act.

In 1979, Capricorn Records released Echoes, a collection of songs from Taylor's first three albums that included "I Will Be In Love With You." In Christgau's Record Guide: Rock Albums of the Seventies (1981), Robert Christgau appraised the compilation and Taylor's career up to that point: "Vocally, Liv is almost James's twin but not quite—he adds a touch of depth to the lissome drawl and subtracts all wow and flutter. Since what makes James unique is also what makes him repulsive, I find Liv more likable but less interesting—especially given his songwriting, which this best-of, drawn from his three early '70s LPs, makes the best of. I ask you, what good is a funny voice without a sense of humor?"

During the 1970s, Taylor appeared on several nationally televised variety shows including The Midnight Special, Dinah! (hosted by Dinah Shore), The Mike Douglas Show and American Bandstand.

=== 1980s ===
In 1980 Taylor released his second album on the Epic label, Man's Best Friend, which was produced by John Boylan and Jeff Baxter. The album contained the songs: "First Time Love," and "Pajamas" (sometimes known as "I've Got My Pajamas On"), which was later adapted into a book for children written by Taylor and his wife, Maggie. In his album review, Joe Viglione wrote that "Man's Best Friend boasts superb musicianship, high production values, good song selection, beautiful vocal performances from Livingston Taylor, and an impressive cast of guest stars who do not get in the way of the singer/songwriter". Guest vocalists included Carla Thomas and Don Henley.

In 1982, Taylor made an appearance on Late Night with David Letterman.

In 1984, Taylor hosted a nationally syndicated television show, similar to American Bandstand called This Week's Music. In some markets the show aired five days weekly. Musical guests included Paul McCartney and Jon Bon Jovi.

In 1986, Livingston and his siblings, James, Kate, Hugh, and Alex Taylor played live on the Today Show on Christmas morning.

In 1988, Taylor's first of two children's books, Pajamas, co-written with his wife, Maggie Taylor was published by Harcourt. In her review for School Library Journal, Patricia Dooley wrote "If we knew the tune we could hum along: the lyrics of a children's song make up the text of this bedtime book." She goes on to say that the illustrator "has provided cuddly-looking acrylics, a smug little kid, and a passle of appealing stuffed animals."

"Life is Good"
Title track from Livingston Taylor's Life is Good album which won the 1989 Boston Music Award for Outstanding Folk Album.

Taylor's one album on the Sony Records label, Life Is Good, was produced by Artie Traum and Scott Petito and released in 1988. "The tribute to Louis Armstrong is an essential element of Taylor's ability to put together albums that are extraordinary in their perfection." The following year the album was the winner of the 1989 Boston Music Award for Outstanding Folk Album.

In 1989, he began teaching the class stage performance at the Berklee College of Music in Boston. (See additional details in Berklee section below.)

On November 21, 1989, his 39th birthday, Taylor made a decision to give up alcohol and pursue a lifelong dream of flying. He bought an airplane and enrolled in aviation classes.

In the late 1980s, Taylor wrote and performed the theme songs for two local Boston-area TV programs: the children's series A Likely Story (produced by WCVB-TV) and the weeknight infotainment program Evening Magazine (produced by WBZ-TV).

=== 1990s ===
Taylor worked with Traum and Petito again on the 1991 release Our Turn to Dance. In his album review, Jim Worbois wrote: "A talented songwriter in his own right (and most of the album is written or co-written by him) he's a good judge of other people's songs. Two fine examples are 'No Easy Way to Break Somebody's Heart' by Barry Mann (Yup, the "Who Put the Bomp (in the Bomp, Bomp, Bomp)" guy) and the Jerome Kern classic 'The Way You Look Tonight.'"

Good Friends, on the Chesky label, was released in 1993.

The second of Taylor's children's books, Can I Be Good? was published by Harcourt in 1993. In her review for School Library Journal, Kate McClelland wrote that the book is "a rhyming story about a fully grown, high-spirited golden retriever who has trouble behaving." She goes on to say that illustrator Ted Rand "has caught this fractious dog's every mood-playfulness, boredom, shame, and remorse" and that the book is "unlikely to be a shelf-sitter." Publishers Weekly also reviewed Can I Be Good?. Diane Roback and Elizabeth Devereaux wrote: "Children will see themselves in the gleeful activities of a golden retriever who finds that it's awfully hard to be good." They go on to say that "Taylor's rhyming prose snaps along merrily, upbeat in tempo yet tinged with wry melancholy that reflects the naughty dog's exasperation."

An album of live concert recordings, Unsolicited Material, again on the Chesky label, was released in 1994. The album "captured the warm-hearted fun of Taylor's concerts and ranged from humorous tunes including Andy Breckman's "Railroad Bill" and "The Dollar Bill Song," a medley of "Songs That Should Never Be Played on the Banjo," and the originals "Jacques Cousteau" and "I Hate Country Music" to heartfelt renditions of Hoagy Carmichael's "Heart and Soul" and Earl Scruggs' "Earl's Breakdown."

For his 1996 Chesky label release Bicycle, Taylor "assembled a diverse backing group (which features his brother James) and dug into a set of songs that were rootsier and more eclectic than much of his previous work". "Boatman" a song on the Bicycle album was later recorded by his brother James in 1997.

Ink, a collection of R&B cover songs, was released on the Chesky label in 1997. "Songs made famous by Ray Charles, The Jackson Five, and Stevie Wonder are re-imagined via the gentle, genial imagination of Livingston Taylor."

In 1998, an eighteen track retrospective of the first decade of Taylor's career, Carolina Day: The Livingston Taylor Collection was released. In 1999 a second live album Snapshot: Live at the Iron Horse was released. It included "My Father's Eyes", a tribute to his father.

=== 2000s ===
In the spring of 2001, as his new home on Martha's Vineyard was completed, he separated from his wife Maggie after 25 years of marriage.

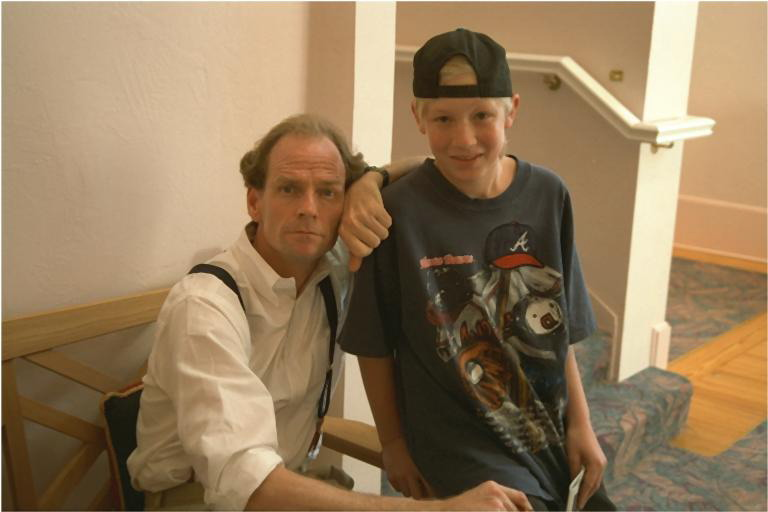
Livingston Taylor with a young Derek Trucks.

From 2000 through September 2006, Taylor was artist-in-residence at Lowell House.

A second retrospective was released in 2005 with 20th Century Masters – The Millennium Collection: The Best of Livingston Taylor.

In 2006 Taylor released his first studio album in nine years, There You Are Again. In his review, Hal Horowitz wrote: "The extended wait between albums has paid off in the immaculate production devoted to each song." Musicians include drummer Steve Gadd, keyboardist Matt Rollings, saxophonist David Sanborn, and bass player Leland Sklar. Taylor's brother, James, and sister, Kate, provide backup vocals on "There I'll Be". Additional backup vocals are provided by Vince Gill and Pam Tillis while former sister-in-law Carly Simon sings a duet with Taylor on "Best of Friends". Spiritual overtones are evident on two tracks: Andraé Crouch conducts the New Day Jubilee Gospel Choir on "Step by Step" and the a cappela choir Take 6 helps out on "Tell Jesus (To Come to My House).

=== 2010s ===
In 2010 Taylor released Last Alaska Moon, produced by Glenn Rosenstein. Musicians include bassist Leland Sklar; drummer Steve Gadd; guitarists Vince Gill, Chris Rodriguez, and J.T. Corenflos; keyboardist Shane Keister, and vocalist Andrea Zonn. The album consists of ten originals and two covers, "Answer My Prayer" with Carole Bayer Sager and Michael Jackson's "The Girl Is Mine", a duet with nephew Ben Taylor.

Four years later, Taylor released Blue Sky, a collection of both original songs and covers of some pop classics.

The year 2017 marked Taylor's 50th year in the music business. To commemorate this milestone, Boston Mayor Marty Walsh and Massachusetts Governor Charlie Baker declared January 18, 2017 to be Livingston Taylor Day in Boston. Taylor was recognized for his 50-year music career, as well as being a long-time professor at Berklee College of Music. That evening a party held at the Verb Hotel in Boston was attended by friends and family including Taylor's sister, Kate, niece Sally Taylor, along with Sally's mother, long-time friend, Carly Simon, Don Law, and Norman Chesky.

"I Must Be Doing Something Right"
Sample of Livingston Taylor's "I Must Be Doing Something Right", originally released on Our Turn to Dance in 1991 and re-recorded in 2017 for Safe Home.

Two days later, Taylor announced the forthcoming release of Safe Home which was officially released on March 3, 2017. The album was recorded in an abandoned church in Brooklyn, New York with musicians Shelly Berg on piano, David Finck on bass, Bashiri Johnson on percussion and Chelsea Berry providing vocals. Like Taylor's previous album Blue Sky, Safe Home includes original songs as well as show tunes by Rodgers and Hammerstein and others. In his review of the album, Jason Warburg wrote: "That's what the aptly-named Safe Home feels like: an impromptu after-dinner living room concert with Livingston Taylor and friends. Taylor's voice has that rich, unique timbre of New England-by-way-of-North-Carolina that he and his brother James have made famous, lending both his vocals and his superb acoustic guitar picking a sense of instant familiarity and comfort." Cover songs include Paul McCartney's "Penny Lane", Irving Berlin's "Anything You Can Do" and the Everly Brothers "Bye Bye Love". Warburg wrote that the opening song, "I Must Be Doing Something Right", a Taylor original, "has the timeless feel of a Cole Porter tune". In his review, Harris Fogel wrote:"this is a lovely collection of tunes, smooth, gentle, and relaxing. This is quiet, confident yet not showy musicianship. The guitar solos, the bass lines, vocals and percussion all work together to create a quiet intimate experience. Highly recommended for the Gentle and Loving People in Your Life."

On April 4, 2017, Taylor announced a crowdfunding campaign to help finish a documentary about his life directed by Tracey Anarella to be released in the fall of 2017. Two months after its launch, an update announced that the crowdfunding campaign had been 109% funded. On October 27, 2017, supporters were sent a downloadable link to the finished film and on November 30, 2017, Fish announced a "soft premier" in the Boston area for Wednesday, February 21, 2018, saying additional details would be forthcoming. Persons interviewed for the documentary, who appear in the film's trailer, include: Sally Taylor, Ian Anderson, Carly Simon, Roger H. Brown, and Ben Taylor. The film was scheduled to be screened at the 27th Annual Woods Hole Film Festival, Cape Cod's oldest film festival, during the eight-day festival running from July 28 to August 4, 2018.

Taylor began 2018 with a tradition of shows at the Iron Horse Music Hall in Northampton, Massachusetts on January 5 and 6.

On January 9, 2018, Peter Fish, producer of the Life is Good documentary announced that a limited number of tickets would be available at the door for the February 21 premiere of the documentary. The screening took place at NewTV in Newton, Massachusetts.

In early April 2018, it was announced that Taylor would be one of three musicians serving as hosts on a multi-day "Roots on the Rails" tour through Vermont in November. On the tour, one of six "Roots on the Rails" tours scheduled for 2018, Taylor will be joined by musicians Susan Werner and Peter Mulvey.

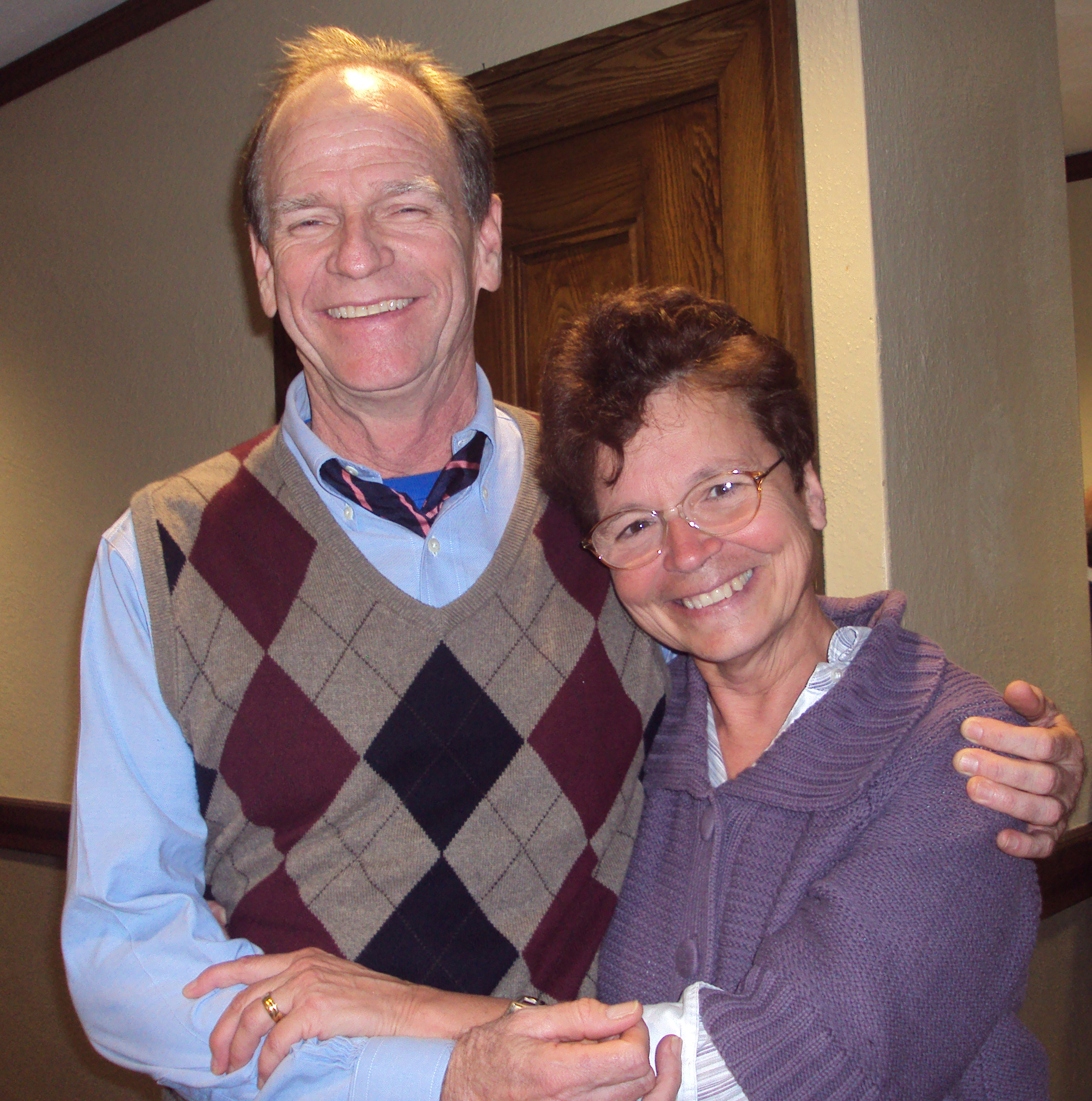
Livingston Taylor with a fan at the Stone Soup Coffeehouse in Pawtucket, RI in 2010.

The First Annual Livingston Taylor Retreat was announced in early summer 2018. In addition to Taylor, instructors announced for the retreat include Melissa Ferrick and Vance Gilbert. The retreat was held August 17–19, 2018 at Boston University.

After eleven years teaching at the Berklee College of Music, Livingston wrote a textbook, Stage Performance, which was published by Pocket Books in 2000.Stage Performance was Taylor's first book written for adults, having published two books for children earlier in his career. A revised edition of the book was published in 2011.

== Personal life ==
Taylor married Margaret "Maggie" Shea on May 1, 1976. After 25 years of marriage, they separated in 2001 and the marriage ended in 2003. During their marriage, they co-authored the 1988 children's book Pajamas. In 2015, Taylor married Gail Arnold. Wedding guests included Steven Spielberg (for whom Arnold has served as private chef), his brother James, as well as other family members and friends who celebrated the occasion in Belmont, Massachusetts. Taylor has been a pilot for over 20 years, often making a 40-minute commute from Boston to Martha's Vineyard in his 1964 Cessna 205. In his spare time, he enjoys working on lawn mowers, tractors and his motorcycles.

He has maintained a close friendship with his former sister-in-law Carly Simon and the two have collaborated several times. In her memoir, Boys in the Trees, Simon states that Livingston Taylor was the first member of the Taylor family whom she met when she drove to the Taylor family home in 1970. She and Livingston were scheduled to perform a duet at a film festival that Simon's brother, Peter, was producing and needed to rehearse.

Taylor is the uncle of Ben Taylor, an actor and Indie folk musician.

== Discography ==
=== Albums ===
Year	Title	US	Record label
1970	Livingston Taylor	82	Capricorn
1971	Liv	147	Capricorn
1973	Over the Rainbow	189	Capricorn
1978	Three Way Mirror	–	Epic
1979	Echoes	–	Capricorn
1980	Man's Best Friend	–	Epic
1988	Life is Good	–	Sony
1991	Our Turn to Dance	–	Vanguard
1993	Good Friends	–	Chesky
1994	Unsolicited Material	–	
1996	Bicycle	–	Chesky
1997	Ink	–	Chesky
1998	Carolina Day: The Livingston Taylor Collection	–	
1999	Snapshot: Live at the Iron Horse	–	Whistling Dog Records
2000	Live Wires (with Deborah Henson-Conant)	–	Bose
2005	The Best of Livingston Taylor	–	
2005	There You Are Again	–	Chesky
2010	Last Alaska Moon	–	Chesky
2014	Blue Sky	–	
2017	Safe Home	–	Chesky
2019	LIVe – 50 Years of Livingston Taylor Box Set	–	

=== Singles ===
Date	Title	US	US AC
1971	Get Out Of Bed	97	–
1972	Carolina Day	93	–
1978	I Will Be in Love With You	30	15
1979	I'll Come Running	82	8
1980	First Time Love	38	13
1988	Loving Arms (with Leah Kunkel)	–	14
1988	City Lights (with James Taylor)	–	23
2006	Best Of Friends (feat. Carly Simon)	–	39

== Filmography ==
=== Film ===
Year	Title	Role	Notes
2018	Livingston Taylor – Life is Good	Self/Performer	Directed by Tracey Anarella
2015	Living Legends Music Presents – An Evening with Livingston Taylor	Self/Performer	With guests Chelsea Berry and Matt Cusson
2009	My Dog – An Unconditional Love Story	Self	Directed by Mark St. Germain
2006	Cándida	Soundtrack – Performer: "I Wish I Were A Cowboy" Writer: "I Wish I Were A Cowboy"	
1985	The Passing	Crew	

=== Television ===
Year	Title	Role	Notes
2015	Thomas Edison's Secret Lab	Actor – Thomas Edison	
1988	The Aztec Two Step 15th Anniversary Show	Self	TV movie
1984	This Week's Music	Self/Host	
1982	Late Night with David Letterman	Self – Performer	Episode 1.44
1979–1980	American Bandstand	Self – Performer	Episode 24.5 (1980) Episode 22.11 (1979)
1979	Dinah!	Self	
1978	The Mike Douglas Show	Self – Performer	Episode 18.64
1974	Don Kirshner's Rock Concert	Self – Performer	Episode 1.14
1974	The Midnight Special	Self – Performer	Episode 2.18
1971	Disco 2	Self – Performer	
1970–1971	Top of the Pops	Self – performer	Episode 8.1 Episode 7.51

== Published works ==
Year	Title	Publisher
2000	Stage Performance	Pocket Books (revised, Mentor Publishing, 2011)
1993	Can I Be Good? (illustrated by Ted Rand)	Gulliver: Harcourt Children's Books
1988	Pajamas (with Maggie Livingston; illustrated by Tim Bowers)	Gulliver: Harcourt Children's Books

== Awards and recognition ==
Year	Association/Award	Category
2017	City of Boston	Livingston Taylor Day (1–18–17)
1989	Boston Music Awards	Outstanding Folk Album for Life is Good
1980	Billboard Top 40	"First Time Love" peaked at No. 38 (9–20–80)
1979	Billboard Top 100	"I'll Come Running" peaked at No. 82 (4–14–79)
1979	Billboard Top 40	"I Will Be in Love With You" peaked at No. 30 (1–6–79)
1972	Billboard Top 100	"Get Out of Bed" peaked at No. 97 (2–12–72)
1971	Billboard Top 100	"Carolina Day" peaked at No. 93 (2–13–71)
