= Alex Taylor (singer) =

American singer (1947–1993)

Alexander Taylor
- Born: February 28, 1947
- Died: March 12, 1993 (aged 46)
- Occupation: Singer
- Parent(s): Isaac M. Taylor; Gertrude Woodard Taylor
- Relatives: James Taylor (brother); Kate Taylor (sister); Livingston Taylor (brother)

Alexander Taylor (February 28, 1947 – March 12, 1993) was an American singer.

== Biography ==
Alexander Taylor was the eldest child of Gertrude and Isaac M. Taylor. He was a member of a family which produced a number of musicians, the most famous of whom is James Taylor, as well as Livingston, Hugh, and Kate Taylor.

Alex Taylor had two sons, Edward and James. The elder son, Edward was adopted; his second son James, is the namesake of Alex's brother James, and inspired his uncle's 1970 hit "Sweet Baby James." Alex Taylor traveled around the states gigging and recorded his finest work at Kenny Veenstra's Progressive Music in Tampa. Taylor suffered a heart attack on March 7, 1993, in Sanford, Florida, while recording a third album at King Snake Records Studio. He died on March 12, 1993 (James's birthday), at age 46.

According to the official Rolling Stone biography of James Taylor, Alex Taylor's death has been attributed to alcoholism. Livingston Taylor has said in an interview that Taylor suddenly stopped breathing while sleeping in a King Snake Records studio and that this occurred shortly after Taylor downed almost an entire bottle of vodka ("what was for him... not an exceptional amount of booze"). James Taylor wrote his song "Enough To Be On Your Way" with Alex's funeral in mind then changed some of the details to commemorate a fictional "Alice".

== Discography ==
- With Friends and Neighbors (1971)
- Dinnertime (1972)
- Third for Music (1974)
- Live at the Horseshoe Tavern (1984) with Dan Aykroyd & the East Coast Funkbusters starring Barbara Holliday, Buck Taylor, Bird Taylor, Paul Shafer and the entire Blues Brothers Band.
- Voodoo in Me (1989)
- Dancing with the Devil (1991)
