= Kate Taylor =

- Born: August 15, 1949 (age 77); Boston, Massachusetts, U.S.
- Occupation: Singer-songwriter
- Years active: 1971–present
- Parent(s): Isaac M. Taylor; Gertrude Woodard Taylor
- Relatives: Alex Taylor (brother); James Taylor (brother); Livingston Taylor (brother)
- Musical career
- Genre: Folk pop
- Labels: Atlantic; Columbia
- Website: katetaylor.com

Kate Taylor (born August 15, 1949) is an American singer-songwriter, originally from Boston, Massachusetts. She is the younger (and only) sister of singer-songwriters James and Alex Taylor and older sister of singer-songwriter Livingston Taylor.

== Biography ==
Taylor was born in Boston and grew up with her four brothers in Chapel Hill, North Carolina, where her father Isaac Taylor was dean of the medical school at the University of North Carolina. Her mother, Trudy, grew up in Newburyport, Massachusetts, and received training as a lyric soprano in Boston.

Taylor formed her first band at age 15 and had her first record deal with Atlantic Records four years later. Produced by her manager at the time, Peter Asher, she released her debut album Sister Kate in 1971. Her second album, the 1978 self-titled Kate Taylor, was produced by her brother James and Lew Hahn on Columbia Records.

The following year Taylor released It's in There, produced by Barry Beckett at the famed Muscle Shoals studios.

== Discography ==
- Sister Kate (1971)
- Kate Taylor (1978)
- It's in There (1979)
- Beautiful Road (2003)
- Kate Taylor Live at The Cutting Room (2005)
- Fair Time! (2009)
- Why Wait! (2021)

=== Participations on compilation albums ===
- Strong Hand of Love, tribute to Mark Heard, 1994
- Orphans of God, tribute to Mark Heard, 1994
- Follow That Road, 1994
- In Harmony: A Sesame Street Record, 1980
