= Carole King discography =

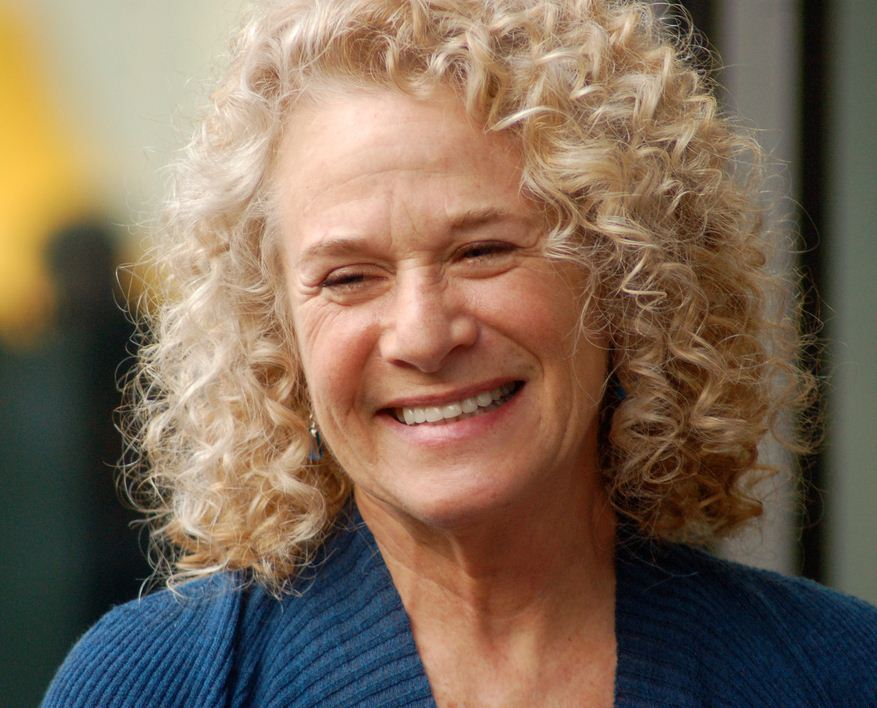
- Carole King at a ceremony to receive a star on the Hollywood Walk of Fame in 2012.
- Studio albums: 17
- Soundtrack albums: 1
- Live albums: 4
- Compilation albums: 7
- Singles: 33
- Video albums: 6
- No. 1 singles: 5

The discography of Carole King, an American singer-songwriter and musician, consists of 17 studio albums, four live albums, seven compilation albums, one soundtrack album and 33 singles as a lead artist.

King has sold over 75 million records worldwide. Billboard ranked her as the 73rd greatest artist of all time. Her second album, Tapestry (1971), was the world's best-selling album by a female artist for a quarter-century, with global sales of 30 million. According to the Recording Industry Association of America, King has sold 19.6 million records in the United States. She is also recognized as the most successful female songwriter of the 20th century, having written or co-written 118 hits on the Billboard Hot 100. Official Charts named King as the most successful female songwriter in the UK charts, penning 61 hits between 1952 and 2005 in the country.

== Albums ==
=== Studio albums ===
List of studio albums, with selected chart positions and certifications
Title	Album details	Peak chart positions								Certifications
Title	Album details	US	AUS	CAN	JPN	NL	NOR	NZ	UK	Certifications
Writer	Released: May 1970; Label: Ode	84	—	—	67	—	—	—	—	
Tapestry	Released: February 10, 1971; Label: Ode	1	3	1	29	—	8	13	4	RIAA: 14× Platinum; ARIA: 8× Platinum; BPI: 2× Platinum; RIAJ: Gold
Music	Released: December 1971; Label: Ode	1	5	2	28	—	10	—	18	RIAA: Platinum
Rhymes & Reasons	Released: November 1972; Label: Ode	2	19	1	34	—	—	—	40	RIAA: Gold
Fantasy	Released: June 1973; Label: Ode	6	24	7	21	—	—	—	—	RIAA: Gold
Wrap Around Joy	Released: September 1974; Label: Ode	1	24	1	73	—	—	—	—	RIAA: Gold
Thoroughbred	Released: January 1976; Label: Ode	3	87	29	72	—	—	—	—	RIAA: Gold
Simple Things	Released: July 1977; Label: Avatar / Capitol	17	19	27	—	—	—	—	—	RIAA: Gold
Welcome Home	Released: May 1978; Label: Avatar / Capitol	104	69	—	—	—	—	—	—	
Touch the Sky	Released: June 1979; Label: Capitol	104	84	62	—	—	—	—	—	
Pearls: Songs of Goffin and King	Released: 1980; Label: Capitol	44	52	66	—	—	—	—	—	
One to One	Released: 1982; Label: Atlantic	119	—	—	—	—	—	—	—	
Speeding Time	Released: 1983; Label: Atlantic	—	—	—	—	—	—	—	—	
City Streets	Released: April 1989; Label: Capitol	111	40	66	—	67	—	—	—	
Colour of Your Dreams	Released: July 25, 1993; Label: Rhythm Safari / Kings X	—	72	—	—	—	—	—	—	
Love Makes the World	Released: September 25, 2001; Label: Rockingale / KELA / Koch	158	—	—	90	—	—	—	86	
A Holiday Carole	Released: November 1, 2011; Label: Rockingale / Hear Music	52	—	—	—	—	—	—	—	
"—" denotes releases that did not chart.

=== Live albums ===
List of live albums, with selected chart positions and certifications
Title	Album details	Peak chart positions											Certifications
Title	Album details	US	AUS	CAN	ITA	JPN	KOR	NL	NOR	NZ	SPN	UK	Certifications
In Concert	Released: March 1, 1994; Label: Rhythm Safari	94	—	—	—	—	—	—	—	—	—	97	
The Carnegie Hall Concert: June 18, 1971	Released: October 29, 1996; Label: Epic / Sony Legacy	—	—	—	—	—	—	—	—	—	—	—	
The Living Room Tour	Released: July 12, 2005; Label: Hear Music / Rockingale	17	51	—	—	—	—	—	—	—	—	—	
Live at the Troubadour (with James Taylor)	Release date: May 4, 2010; Label: Hear Music / Concord Music Group	4	—	16	30	19	81	76	24	4	39	33	RIAA: Gold
Tapestry: Live in Hyde Park	Release date: September 15, 2017; Label: Legacy Recordings	—	—	—	—	49	—	—	—	—	—	—	
Live at Montreux 1973	Release date: June 14, 2019; Label: Eagle Vision / Universal Music Group	—	—	—	—	—	—	—	—	—	—	—	
"—" denotes releases that did not chart

=== Compilation albums ===
List of compilation albums, with selected chart positions and certifications
Title	Album details	Peak chart positions				Certifications
Title	Album details	US	AUS	NZ	UK	Certifications
Her Greatest Hits: Songs of Long Ago	Released: 1978; Label: Ode	47	73	—	—	RIAA: Platinum; MC: Gold
A Natural Woman: The Ode Collection (1968–1976)	Released: September 13, 1994; Label: Epic/Sony Legacy	—	—	35	31	BPI: Silver
Time Gone By	Released: 1994; Label: Priority	—	—	—	—	
Goin' Back	Released: June 2, 1998; Label: Sony	—	—	—	—	
Super Hits	Released: May 9, 2000; Label: Sony	—	—	—	—	
Collections	Released: March 7, 2006; Label: Sony	—	—	—	—	
The Essential Carole King	Released: May 25, 2010; Label: Ode/Epic/Legacy	—	—	—	—	BPI: Silver
The Legendary Demos	Released: April 24, 2012; Label: Hear Music	56	—	—	—	
A Beautiful Collection	Released: February 27, 2015; Label: Sony	—	—	16	32	
"—" denotes releases that did not chart

=== Soundtrack albums ===
List of soundtrack albums, with selected chart positions and certifications
Title	Album details	Peak chart positions
Title	Album details	US
Really Rosie	Released: February 1975; Label: Ode	20

=== Other appearances ===
Year	Single	Album
1998	"Anyone at All"	You've Got Mail: Music from the Motion Picture

== Singles ==
=== As lead artist ===
List of singles, with selected chart positions
Title	Year	Peak chart positions										Certifications	Album
Title	Year	US	US AC	AUS	AUT	CAN	CAN AC	BEL (FL)	NZ	SWI	UK	Certifications	Album
"The Right Girl" / "Goin' Wild"	1958	—	—	—	—	—	—	—	—	—	—		Non-album singles
"Baby Sittin'" / "Under the Stars"	1959	—	—	—	—	—	—	—	—	—	—		Non-album singles
"Short Mort" / "Queen of the Beach"	1959	—	—	—	—	—	—	—	—	—	—		Non-album singles
"Oh Neil" / "A Very Special Boy"	1960	—	—	—	—	—	—	—	—	—	—		Non-album singles
"School Bells Are Ringing" / "I Didn't Have Any Summer Romance"	1962	123	—	—	—	—	—	—	—	—	—		Non-album singles
"It Might as Well Rain Until September" / "Nobody's Perfect"	1962	22	—	13	—	12	—	—	—	—	3		The Dimension Dolls
"He's a Bad Boy" / "We Grew Up Together"	1963	94	—	—	—	—	—	—	—	—	—		The Dimension Dolls
"A Road to Nowhere" / "Some of Your Loving"	1966	—	—	—	—	—	—	—	—	—	—		Non-album single
"Up on the Roof" / "Eventually"	1970	—	—	—	—	—	—	—	—	—	—		Writer
"It's Too Late" / "I Feel the Earth Move"	1971	1	1	5	—	1	2	—	—	—	6	RIAA: Platinum; BPI: Gold	Tapestry
"So Far Away" / "Smackwater Jack"	1971	14	3	80	—	17	12	—	—	—	—	RIAA: Gold	Tapestry
"You've Got a Friend" / "Beautiful"	1971	—	—	—	—	—	—	—	—	—	—	RIAA: Gold	Tapestry
"Sweet Seasons"	1972	9	2	19	—	12	21	—	—	—	—		Music
"Been to Canaan"	1972	24	1	97	—	15	2	—	—	—	—		Rhymes and Reasons
"Believe in Humanity"	1973	28	—	100	—	44	9	—	—	—	—		Fantasy
"You Light Up My Life"	1973	67	6	—	—	44	97	—	—	—	—		Fantasy
"Corazon"	1973	37	5	—	—	28	5	—	—	—	—		Fantasy
"Jazzman"	1974	2	4	56	—	5	1	—	—	—	—		Wrap Around Joy
"Nightingale"	1975	9	1	—	—	—	13	—	—	—	—		Wrap Around Joy
"Only Love Is Real"	1976	28	1	—	—	53	7	—	—	—	—		Thoroughbred
"High Out of Time"	1976	76	40	—	—	—	40	—	—	—	—		Thoroughbred
"Hard Rock Cafe"	1977	30	8	10	19	23	12	21	37	12	—		Simple Things
"Simple Things"	1977	—	37	—	—	—	6	—	—	—	—		Simple Things
"Morning Sun"	1978	—	43	—	—	—	—	—	—	—	—		Welcome Home
"One Fine Day"	1980	12	11	—	—	86	2	—	—	—	—		Pearls: Songs of Goffin and King
"One to One"	1982	45	20	—	—	—	7	—	—	—	—		One to One
"City Streets"	1989	—	14	74	—	92	—	—	—	—	—		City Streets
"Now and Forever"	1992	—	18	—	—	—	—	—	—	—	—		Colour of Your Dreams
"Love Makes the World"	2001	—	—	—	—	—	—	—	—	—	—		Love Makes the World
"Girl Power"	2007	—	—	—	—	—	—	—	—	—	—		Non-album singles
"I Believe in Loving You"	2013	—	—	—	—	—	—	—	—	—	—		Non-album singles
"One Small Voice"	2017	—	—	—	—	—	—	—	—	—	—		Non-album singles
"One (2018)"	2018	—	—	—	—	—	—	—	—	—	—		Non-album singles
"—" denotes releases that did not chart

=== Collaborations ===
Single	Year	Artist	Album
"(You Make Me Feel Like) A Natural Woman"	1998	Mariah Carey, Celine Dion, Gloria Estefan, Aretha Franklin, and Shania Twain	VH1 Divas Live
"You've Got a Friend"	1998	Celine Dion, Gloria Estefan, and Shania Twain	VH1 Divas Live
"One True Love"	2001	Semisonic	All About Chemistry
"Everyday People"	2007	Reba McEntire	Reba: Duets

== Video albums ==
Title	Year	Certification
One to One	1982	
In Concert	1994	ARIA: Gold
Welcome to My Living Room	2007	
Live at the Troubadour (with James Taylor)	2010	RIAA: 6× Platinum; ARIA: Gold
In Tokyo	2010	
Carole King: Natural Woman	2016	
Live at Montreux - 1973	2019	

== See also ==
- Tapestry Revisited: A Tribute to Carole King
- Marcia Sings Tapestry
- Beautiful: The Carole King Musical
