= The Living Room Tour =

Live album by Carole King
- Released: July 12, 2005
- Recorded: July – August 2004
- Venues: Auditorium Theatre (Chicago, Illinois), Greek Theatre (Los Angeles, California), Cape Cod Melody Tent (Hyannis, Massachusetts)
- Genres: R&B, pop
- Length: CD1: 42:12; CD2: 46:20
- Label: Rockingale/Hear Music
- Producers: Rudy Guess, Carole King

Carole King chronology
Love Makes the World (2001)	The Living Room Tour (2005)	Live at the Troubadour (2010)

Professional ratings
Review scores
Source	Rating
AllMusic	3.5/5 stars

The Living Room Tour is a live album by Carole King released in 2005. It consists of live recordings of most of the songs from Tapestry. Her daughters Louise and Sherry are background singers and guitarist Gary Burr joined her on several songs. This album debuted at #17 in the US, becoming King's highest-charting album since 1977. That was largely due to television advertisements and that it was available in Starbucks retailers.

For the week of July 18, 2005, it was the #1 album on Amazon, and it was the #2 album of July 2005 on Amazon. In its first week, The Living Room Tour sold 44,000 copies in the United States, and has since sold over 330,000 copies in the United States.

In August 2006, the album re-entered the Billboard 200 at #151, because it was once again available in all Starbucks locations in the US.

A live video album filmed during the tour, titled Welcome to My Living Room, was released on DVD on October 23, 2007.

== Track listing ==
All songs written by Carole King (except where noted).

=== Disc one ===
1. "Welcome To My Living Room" – 1:58
2. "Peace in the Valley" (King, Toni Stern) – 3:42
3. "Love Makes the World" (King, Sam Hollander, Dave Schommer) – 4:23
4. "Now and Forever" – 3:18
5. "Where You Lead I Will Follow" (King, Toni Stern) – 3:24
  - Duet with her daughter, Louise Goffin
6. "Lay Down My Life" – 4:20
7. "Jazzman" (King, Dave Palmer) – 4:00
8. "Smackwater Jack" (Gerry Goffin, King) – 4:12
9. "Wishful Thinking" – 4:12
10. "Medley: "Take Good Care of My Baby/"It Might As Well Rain Until September"/"Go Away Little Girl"/"I'm into Something Good"/"Hey Girl"/"One Fine Day"/"Will You Love Me Tomorrow" (Goffin, King) – 8:39

=== Disc two ===
1. "Loving You Forever" (King, Gary Burr) – 3:32
2. "It's Too Late" (King, Stern) – 5:22
3. "So Far Away" – 4:52
4. "Sweet Seasons" (King, Stern) – 3:21
5. "Chains" (Goffin, King) – 4:09
6. "Pleasant Valley Sunday" (Goffin, King) – 3:45
7. "Being At War With Each Other" – 4:05
8. "I Feel The Earth Move" – 4:04
9. "(You Make Me Feel Like) A Natural Woman" (Goffin, King, Jerry Wexler) – 3:58
  - Duet with her daughter, Sherry Goffin Kondor.
10. "You've Got a Friend" – 5:32
11. "The Locomotion" (Goffin, King) – 3:38

== Personnel ==
- Carole King – vocals, piano, guitar
- Rudy Guess – vocals, guitar, bass guitar
- Gary Burr – vocals, guitar, bass
- Louise Goffin – vocals on "Where You Lead I Will Follow"
- Sherry Goffin Kondor – vocals on "A Natural Woman"

== Charts ==
Chart performance for The Living Room Tour
Chart (2005)	Peak position
Australian Albums (ARIA)	51
US Billboard 200	17

== Tour ==
Date	City	Country	Venue
US and Canada 2004
July 15, 2004	Chicago	United States	Auditorium Theater
July 16, 2004	Cleveland	United States	Tower City Amphitheatre
July 18, 2004	Saratoga	United States	Saratoga Springs Performing Arts Center
July 20, 2004	Gilford	United States	Bank of New Hampshire Pavilion
July 21, 2004	Philadelphia	United States	Tower Theatre
July 22, 2004	Hyannis	United States	Cape Cod Melody Tent
July 24, 2004	Westbury	United States	Westbury Music Fair
July 25, 2004	Boston	United States	Leader Bank Pavilion
July 27, 2004	Uncasville	United States	Mohegan Sun Arena
July 30, 2004	Atlanta	United States	Chastain Park Amphitheatre
July 31, 2004	Nashville	United States	Ryman Auditorium
August 1, 2004	Boca Raton	United States	Mizner Park Amphitheatre
August 3, 2004	Clearwater	United States	Ruth Eckerd Hall
August 4, 2004	Vienna	United States	Wolf Trap
August 6, 2004	Seattle	United States	Pier 62 and 63
August 7, 2004	Portland	United States	Arlene Schnitzer Concert Hall
August 19, 2004	Los Angeles	United States	Greek Theatre
August 20, 2004	San Francisco	United States	SF Masonic Auditorium
August 21, 2004	Las Vegas	United States	The Colosseum at Caesars Palace
US and Canada 2005
July 3, 2005	Rama	Canada	Casino Rama
July 4, 2005	Rama	Canada	Casino Rama
July 6, 2005	Minneapolis	United States	Orpheum Theatre
July 8, 2005	Chicago	United States	Auditorium Theater
July 9, 2005	Rochester Hills	United States	Meadow Brook Amphitheatre
July 11, 2005	Hyannis	United States	Cape Cod Melody Tent
July 13, 2005	New York	United States	Radio City Music Hall
July 14, 2005	Cohasset	United States	South Shore Music Circus
July 16, 2005	Vienna	United States	Wolf Trap
July 17, 2005	Raleigh	United States	Coastal Credit Union Music Park at Walnut Creek
July 19, 2005	Charlotte	United States	PNC Music Pavilion
July 20, 2005	Atlanta	United States	Chastain Park Amphitheater
July 21, 2005	Birmingham	United States	BJCC Concert Hall
July 23, 2005	Indianapolis	United States	Murat Theatre
July 24, 2005	Memphis	United States	Orpheum Theatre
July 26, 2005	New Orleans	United States	Saenger Theatre
July 28, 2005	Austin	United States	The Backyard
July 29, 2005	Woodlands	United States	Cynthia Woods Mitchell Pavilion
July 30, 2005	Oklahoma City	United States	Oklahoma City Zoo Amphitheatre
August 3, 2005	Morrison	United States	Red Rocks Amphitheatre
August 5, 2005	Phoenix	United States	Celebrity Theatre
August 6, 2005	Temecula	United States	Pechanga Resort & Casino
August 7, 2005	Temecula	United States	Pechanga Resort & Casino
August 12, 2005	Santa Barbara	United States	Santa Barbara Bowl
August 13, 2005	Saratoga	United States	Mountain Winery
August 14, 2005	Santa Rosa	United States	Luther Burbank Center
Australia 2006
November 17, 2006	Melbourne	Australia	Rod Laver Arena
November 19, 2006	Perth	Australia	Sandalford Winery
November 22, 2006	Hobart	Australia	Derwent Entertainment Centre
November 24, 2006	Brisbane	Australia	River Stage
November 25, 2006	Hunter Valley	Australia	Tempus II Winery
November 30, 2006	Sydney	Australia	Sydney Entertainment Centre
December 2, 2006	Auckland	New Zealand	Trusts Stadium
December 4, 2006	Christchurch	New Zealand	Westpac Centre
Japan 2007 (With Fergie and Mary J. Blige)
November 5, 2007	Osaka	Japan	Osaka Jo Hall
November 6, 2007	Osaka	Japan	Osaka Jo Hall
November 10, 2007	Satima	Japan	Satima Super Arena
November 12, 2007	Tokyo	Japan	Nippon Budokan
November 13, 2007	Tokyo	Japan	Nippon Budokan
North America Summer 2008
July 9, 2008	Clearwater	United States	Ruth Eckerd Hall
July 10, 2008	Hollywood	United States	Hard Rock Live
July 12, 2008	Mashantucket	United States	Foxwoods Resort and Casino
July 13, 2008	Niagara Falls	Canada	Niagara Fallsview Casino Resort
Japan 2008
November 10, 2008	Tokyo	Japan	Bunkamura
November 11, 2008	Tokyo	Japan	Bunkamura
November 14, 2008	Osaka	Japan	Koseinenkin Hall
November 15, 2008	Osaka	Japan	Koseinenkin Hall
November 17, 2008	Nagoya	Japan	Century Hall
November 21, 2008	Tokyo	Japan	International Forum Hall A
November 22, 2008	Tokyo	Japan	International Forum Hall A
November 24, 2008	Kobe	Japan	International Hall

== DVD ==
Welcome to My Living Room was released on DVD on October 23, 2007 by Rockingale Records. It was filmed during the tour in August 2005 in Temecula, California.

Track listing

1. "Song of Long Ago"
2. "Welcome to My Living Room"
3. "Beautiful"
4. "Where You Lead, I Will Follow"
5. "Say Goodbye Today"
6. "Now and Forever"
7. "Been to Canaan"
8. "Nobody Wants to be Lonely"
9. "Love's Been a Little Bit Hard on Me"
10. "Smackwater Jack"
11. "Medley" ("The Right Girl", "Keep Your Hands Off My Baby", "Every Breath I Take", "I'm Into Something Good", "Go Away Little Girl", "Hey Girl", "One Fine Day", "Will You Love Me Tomorrow")
12. "Loving You Forever"
13. "Up on the Roof"
14. "It's Too Late"
15. "(You Make Me Feel Like a) Natural Woman"
16. "Hard Rock Café"
17. "Chains"
18. "Pleasant Valley Sunday"
19. "I Feel the Earth Move"
20. "So Far Away"
21. "You've Got a Friend"
22. "Locomotion"
