= Troubadour Reunion Tour =

2010 concert tour by Carole King and James Taylor

Troubador Reunion Tour
- Tour by Carole King and James Taylor
- Location: Oceania; Asia; North America
- Associated album: Live at the Troubadour
- Start date: March 27, 2010
- End date: July 20, 2010
- Legs: 3
- No. of shows: 57

The Troubadour Reunion Tour was a 2010 international concert tour by Carole King and James Taylor. It celebrated the 40th anniversary of their first performance together at The Troubadour in November 1970, and was a continuation of their reunion at the Troubadour in November 2007.

== History ==
The tour was announced on November 12, 2009. Over 50 dates were scheduled in Australia and New Zealand, Japan, and North America. The tour began on March 26, 2010, at the Rod Laver Arena in Melbourne, Australia.

The touring band included the original support band from The Troubadour: Danny Kortchmar (guitar), Leland Sklar (bass) and Russ Kunkel (drums). Other members were Robbie Kondor (keyboards, piano, organ, accordion, chromatic harmonica), Arnold McCuller (vocals), Kate Markowitz (vocals) and Andrea Zonn (vocals and fiddle).

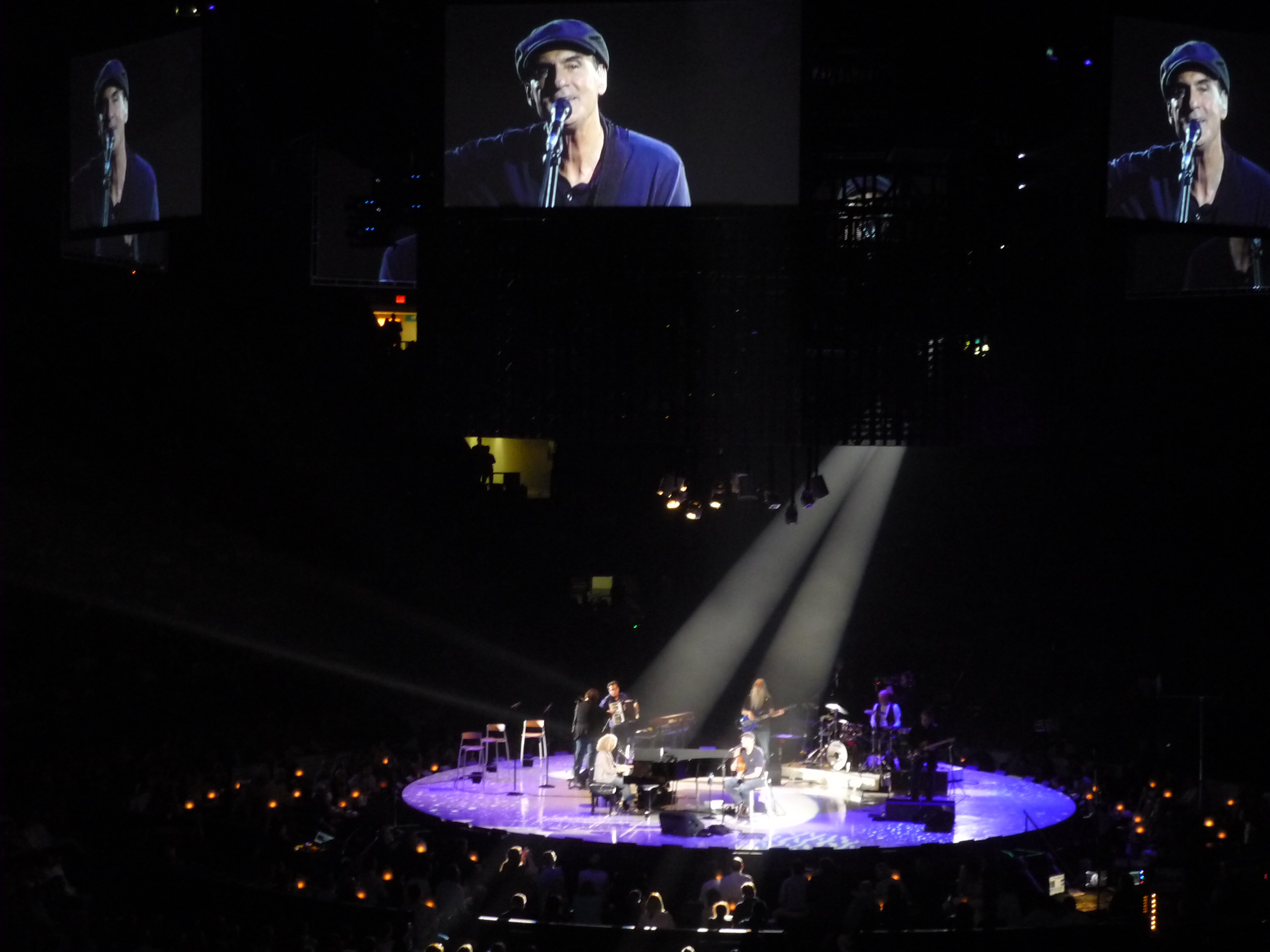
Taylor performing "Sweet Baby James", with King on piano just as on the original recording and other of those band members as well, at a Madison Square Garden show in New York.

For secondary ticket sales, for the week of January 24, 2010, it was estimated to be the best selling ticket event in the world, beating out even the Super Bowl. These ticket sales were based on sales from the TicketNetwork Exchange, the largest secondary ticket exchange in the world. This does not include primary ticket sellers such as Ticketmaster.

The North America leg of the tour incorporated a stage design that included intimate nightclub-style seating. The proceeds from these seats benefit various charities.

The Oceania leg of the tour was promoted by Michael Coppel, who was also promoting Lady Gaga's The Monster Ball Tour at the same time. Lady Gaga attended one of the Troubadour Reunion concerts in Sydney.

The final performance of the tour was on July 20, 2010, at the Honda Center in Anaheim, California. In an interview with Carole King and James Taylor for Billboard Magazine, Taylor stated there will probably never be another Troubadour Reunion Tour. However, he mentioned that a European tour was possible.

== Tour dates ==
Date	City	Country	Venue
Australia and New Zealand
March 26, 2010	Melbourne	Australia	Rod Laver Arena
March 27, 2010	Melbourne	Australia	Rod Laver Arena
March 29, 2010	Adelaide	Australia	Adelaide Entertainment Centre
March 31, 2010	Brisbane	Australia	Brisbane Entertainment Centre
April 1, 2010	Brisbane	Australia	Brisbane Entertainment Centre
April 3, 2010	Hunter Valley	Australia	Hope Estate
April 5, 2010	Sydney	Australia	Sydney Entertainment Centre
April 6, 2010	Sydney	Australia	Sydney Entertainment Centre
April 8, 2010	Christchurch	New Zealand	Westpac Arena
April 10, 2010	Auckland	New Zealand	Vector Arena
Asia
April 14, 2010	Tokyo	Japan	Nippon Budokan
April 16, 2010	Tokyo	Japan	Nippon Budokan
April 17, 2010	Yokohama	Japan	Pacifico Yokohama
North America
May 7, 2010	Portland	United States	Rose Garden Theatre
May 9, 2010	Seattle	United States	KeyArena
May 11, 2010	San Jose	United States	HP Pavilion at San Jose
May 13, 2010	Los Angeles	United States	Hollywood Bowl
May 14, 2010	Los Angeles	United States	Hollywood Bowl
May 15, 2010	Los Angeles	United States	Hollywood Bowl
May 18, 2010	Santa Barbara	United States	Santa Barbara Bowl
May 19, 2010	Glendale	United States	Jobing.com Arena
May 21, 2010	Kansas City	United States	Sprint Center
May 22, 2010	Nashville	United States	Bridgestone Arena
May 24, 2010	Rosemont	United States	Allstate Arena
May 25, 2010	Saint Paul	United States	Xcel Energy Center
May 27, 2010	Auburn Hills	United States	The Palace of Auburn Hills
May 28, 2010	Toronto	Canada	Air Canada Centre
May 30, 2010	Columbus	United States	Schottenstein Center
June 2, 2010	Charlotte	United States	Time Warner Cable Arena
June 3, 2010	Duluth	United States	Arena at Gwinnett Center
June 5, 2010	Sunrise	United States	BankAtlantic Center
June 6, 2010	Tampa	United States	St. Pete Times Forum
June 8, 2010	Washington, D.C.	United States	Verizon Center
June 10, 2010	Philadelphia	United States	Wachovia Center
June 12, 2010	Uncasville	United States	Mohegan Sun Arena
June 13, 2010	Uncasville	United States	Mohegan Sun Arena
June 15, 2010	New York City	United States	Madison Square Garden
June 16, 2010	New York City	United States	Madison Square Garden
June 19, 2010	Boston	United States	TD Garden
June 20, 2010	Boston	United States	TD Garden
June 22, 2010	Philadelphia	United States	Wachovia Center
June 23, 2010	Washington, D.C.	United States	Verizon Center
June 25, 2010	Newark	United States	Prudential Center
June 26, 2010	Pittsburgh	United States	Mellon Arena
June 28, 2010	Wilkes-Barre	United States	Mohegan Sun Arena at Casey Plaza
June 30, 2010	New York City	United States	Madison Square Garden
July 3, 2010	Lenox	United States	Tanglewood
July 4, 2010	Lenox	United States	Tanglewood
July 5, 2010	Lenox	United States	Tanglewood
July 7, 2010	Cleveland	United States	Quicken Loans Arena
July 9, 2010	Chicago	United States	United Center
July 10, 2010	St. Louis	United States	Scottrade Center
July 12, 2010	Sun Valley	United States	Sun Valley Center for the Arts
July 14, 2010	Denver	United States	Pepsi Center
July 15, 2010	Salt Lake City	United States	EnergySolutions Arena
July 17, 2010	Las Vegas	United States	MGM Grand Garden Arena
July 19, 2010	Oakland	United States	Oracle Arena
July 20, 2010	Anaheim	United States	Honda Center

== Box office score data ==
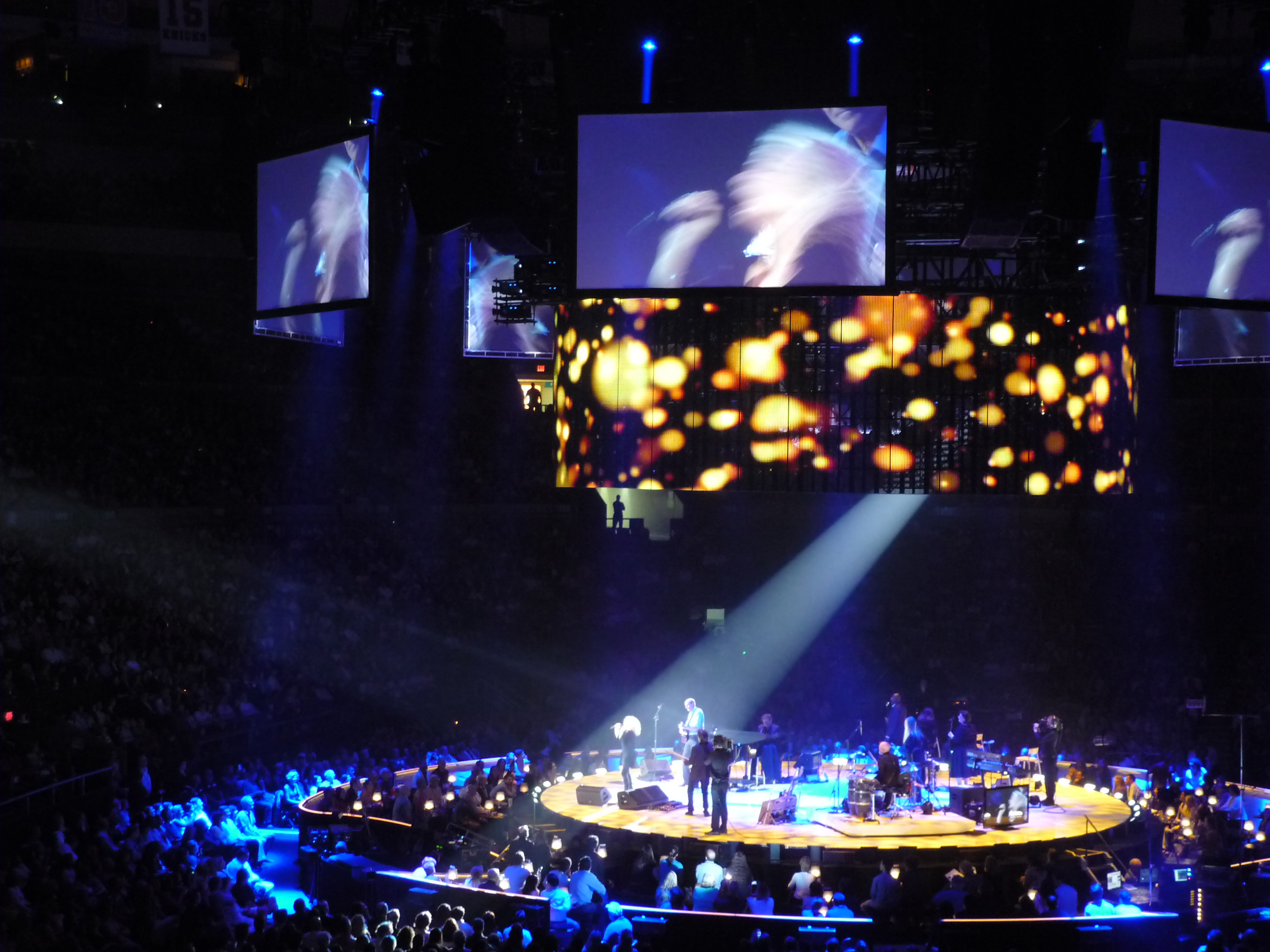
King performing "(You Make Me Feel Like) A Natural Woman" at Madison Square Garden to close out the first set.

Venue	City	Tickets sold / Available	Gross sales
Rod Laver Arena	Melbourne	17,394 / 22,192 (78%)	$2,559,050
Sydney Entertainment Centre	Sydney	18,018 / 19,813 (91%)	$2,462,600
Brisbane Entertainment Center	Brisbane	15,535 / 19,104 (81%)	$2,416,080
CBS Canterbury Arena	Christchurch	4,283 / 4,643 (92%)	$306,987
Rose Garden Theatre	Portland	10,681 / 12,560 (85%)	$918,160
KeyArena	Seattle	14,532 / 14,793 (98%)	$1,215,985
HP Pavilion at San Jose	San Jose	15,194 / 15,194 (100%)	$1,036,809
Hollywood Bowl	Hollywood	51,168 / 51,484 (99%)	$3,512,071
Santa Barbara Bowl	Santa Barbara	4,542 / 4,542 (100%)	$603,892
Jobing.com Arena	Glendale	12,286 / 12,286 (100%)	$992,621
Sprint Center	Kansas City	13,825 / 13,825 (100%)	$1,128,255
Bridgestone Arena	Nashville	13,472 / 13,472 (100%)	$1,094,460
Allstate Arena	Rosemont	17,076 / 17,076 (100%)	$1,231,730
Xcel Energy Center	Saint Paul	17,694 / 17,694 (100%)	$1,382,880
The Palace of Auburn Hills	Auburn Hills	14,238 / 14,238 (100%)	$1,078,955
Air Canada Centre	Toronto	17,910 / 17,910 (100%)	$1,574,240
Schottenstein Center	Columbus	14,860 / 14,860 (100%)	$1,250,982
Time Warner Cable Arena	Charlotte	13,177 / 16,926 (78%)	$1,104,823
Arena at Gwinnett Center	Duluth	12,167 / 12,167 (100%)	$1,004,955
BankAtlantic Center	Sunrise	14,860 / 14,860 (100%)	$1,221,470
St. Pete Times Forum	Tampa	14,449 / 14,449 (100%)	$1,176,905
Verizon Center	Washington, DC	28,508 / 34,807 (82%)	$2,681,632
Wachovia Center	Philadelphia	31,209 / 34,325 (91%)	$2,936,330
Mohegan Sun Arena	Uncasville	15,616 / 15,685 (99%)	$1,469,660
Madison Square Garden	New York City	53,791 / 53,791 (100%)	$5,808,204
TD Garden	Boston	30,851 / 34,032 (91%)	$3,052,520
Prudential Center	Newark	14,184 / 16,870 (84%)	$1,465,882
Mellon Arena	Pittsburgh	14,302 / 14,302 (100%)	$1,157,915
Mohegan Sun Arena at Casey Plaza	Wilkes-Barre	8,340 / 8,954 (93%)	$804,677
Tanglewood	Lenox	54,340 / 54,648 (99%)	$2,154,109
Quicken Loans Arena	Cleveland	11,494 / 14,043 (82%)	$998,004
United Center	Chicago	13,993 / 13,993 (100%)	$1,257,150
Scottrade Center	St. Louis	11,271 / 11,271 (100%)	$950,595
Pepsi Center	Denver	10,613 / 14,022 (76%)	$1,012,820
Energy Solutions Arena	Salt Lake City	7,104 / 7,377 (96%)	$563,319
MGM Grand Garden Arena	Las Vegas	9,627 / 10,910 (88%)	$996,245
Oracle Arena	Oakland	9,892 / 9,892 (100%)	$903,038
Honda Center	Anaheim	12,793 / 17,279 (74%)	$1,110,587

== Set list ==
One typical set list for the tour has been:

First set

1. "Blossom"
2. "So Far Away"
3. "Machine Gun Kelly"
4. "Carolina in My Mind"
5. "Sunshine Sunshine"
6. "Smackwater Jack"
7. "Country Road"
8. "Where You Lead"
9. "Your Smiling Face"
10. "Song of Long Ago" →
11. "Long Ago and Far Away"
12. "Beautiful"
13. "Shower the People"
14. "Way Over Yonder"

Second set

1. "Copperline"
2. "Crying in the Rain"
3. "Mexico"
4. "Sweet Baby James"
5. "Jazzman"
6. "Will You Love Me Tomorrow"
7. "Steamroller Blues"
8. "It's Too Late"
9. "Fire and Rain"
10. "I Feel the Earth Move"
11. "You've Got a Friend"

Encore

1. "Up on the Roof"
2. "How Sweet It Is (To Be Loved by You)"
3. "You Can Close Your Eyes"
4. "The Loco-Motion"

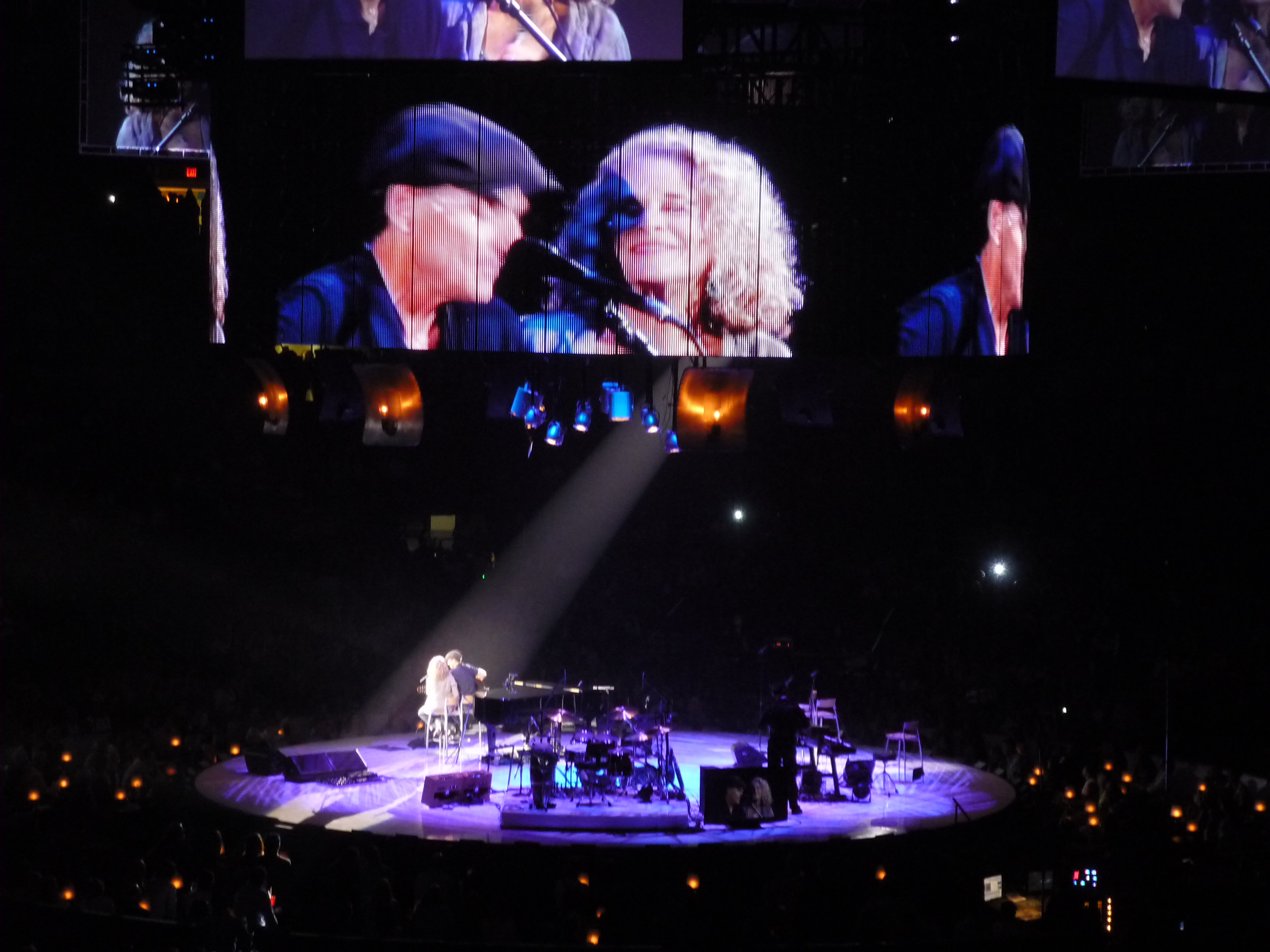
Taylor and King performing "You Can Close Your Eyes" together, without band, to end the evening at Madison Square Garden.

Other songs played included "Honey Don't Leave L.A.", "Sweet Seasons", and "(You Make Me Feel Like) A Natural Woman" (as the first-set closer). The second or third song of the second set was a "fan request" slot, taken from a web poll for that show from a constrained list and alternating between King and Taylor.

Notes

- While in the beginning of the tour (until May 18, 2010) “The Loco-Motion" was the final song, in later concerts (starting on May 19, 2010) the final song was "You Can Close Your Eyes" and "The Loco-Motion" was not played except for a one off return on June 23.
- Until May 30, 2010, Blossom opened all shows but then starting June 2, 2010 Blossom & Something in the way she Moves alternated the opening slot - Something in the way she Moves opened the final stretch of the tour.

== Second set requests ==
(Typically played right after "Crying in the Rain", sometimes displacing "Mexico"). King and Taylor alternated.

- For the show in Yokohama, the second show at the Hollywood Bowl, the show in Columbus: "Chains"
- For the show in St. Paul, the first night in Boston "Your Smiling Face"
