= Where You Lead =

1971 Carole King song

Song by Carole King

from the album Tapestry
- Released: 1971
- Recorded: January 1971
- Studio: A&M (Hollywood, California)
- Genre: Folk-pop
- Length: 3:20
- Label: Ode/A&M
- Songwriters: Carole King, Toni Stern
- Producer: Lou Adler

"Where You Lead" is a song written in 1970 by Carole King with lyricist Toni Stern, introduced on King's 1971 album Tapestry. A Top 40 hit for Barbra Streisand in both a studio version from her 1971 album Barbra Joan Streisand and a live version featured on her 1972 album Live Concert at the Forum—the latter in a medley titled "Sweet Inspiration/Where You Lead"—the song has also served as the main theme song for the 2000–2007 The WB dramedy series Gilmore Girls in a lyrically revised version recorded by King and Louise Goffin and was featured on the 2002 soundtrack album Our Little Corner of the World: Music from Gilmore Girls.

== Original version ==
"Where You Lead" is one of two Carole King/Toni Stern collaborations featured on the 1971 album Tapestry, the other being the #1 single "It's Too Late". King had written the music and the majority of the lyric for "Where You Lead" when she solicited the assistance of Stern, saying: "I can't write the bridge to this: if you can figure out the bridge you can get [co-writing] credit for the song." Disliking the arguably servile stance of the song as written by King so far, Stern swiftly conceived lyrics for its bridge which she felt expressed a more empowered narrative voice. The lyrics Stern submitted to King included the lines: "...if you want to live in fucking New York City / Honey you know I will": King herself deleted "fucking", then sought Tapestry producer Lou Adler's approval of the "New York City" reference; Adler's approval was forthcoming and the lyrics for "Where You Lead" were thus complete.

Inspired by the Book of Ruth, where it says: "Where you go, I will go", "Where You Lead" was described by Rolling Stone critic Jon Landau as an "ingratiatingly witty song that seems to parody the romantic extremes of some of Carole's earlier work." Landau also praises the power of Russ Kunkel's drumming on the song. Author James Perone states that a superficial reading of the lyrics could suggest that the song reinforces stereotypes that a woman should not put her desire for a career ahead of pleasing her husband. But he goes on to say that the singer has actually made "an informed and empowered decision" to follow her man "because of the life changing impact" the relationship has had on her.

The 2008 "Legacy Edition" release of Tapestry coupled a remastered version of the Tapestry album with a second disc which featured live performances by King – from concerts in 1973 and 1976 – of all of the songs from Tapestry except for "Where You Lead", reflecting the fact that soon after the release of Tapestry, King came to the realization that "Where You Lead" was somewhat politically incorrect and as a result stopped performing it live, only reinstating the song in her concert setlists following its 2000 lyrical revision.

== Personnel ==
- Carole King – piano, vocals
- Merry Clayton – background vocals
- Danny "Kootch" Kortchmar – electric guitar
- Russ Kunkel – drums
- Charles "Charlie" Larkey – bass guitar
- Ralph Schuckett – electric piano
- Julia Tillman – background vocals

== Barbra Streisand versions ==
=== Barbra Joan Streisand album track ===
"Where You Lead"
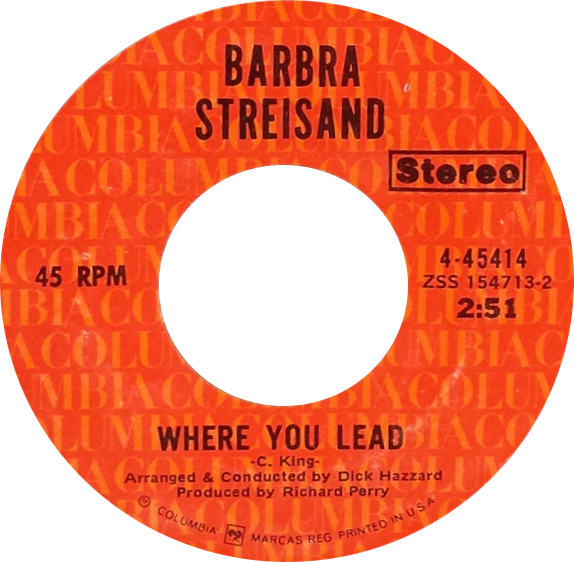
- US single of studio recording

Single by Barbra Streisand

from the album Barbra Joan Streisand
- B-side: "Since I Fell for You"
- Released: June 1971
- Studio: United (Las Vegas)
- Genre: Easy listening
- Length: album 3:00 single 2:51
- Label: Columbia Records
- Songwriters: Carole King, Toni Stern
- Producer: Richard Perry

Barbra Streisand singles chronology
"Flim Flam Man" (1971)	"Where You Lead" (1971)	"Mother" (1971)

Barbra Streisand recorded "Where You Lead" in a 21 April 1971 session which would yield seven tracks featured on the August 1971 album release Barbra Joan Streisand, which album would include a total of three covers of Tapestry tracks: "Where You Lead", "Beautiful", and "You've Got a Friend".

On "Where You Lead" Streisand had the backing of the all-female band Fanny augmented by Billy Preston on organ and disc producer Richard Perry on tambourine: Fanny – who arranged the track – also served as chorale, augmented by Clydie King, Venetta Fields, and Oma Drake. Issued as advance single in June 1971, "Where You Lead" just reached Top 40 hit status, #40 being its peak on the Billboard Hot 100.

=== Sweet Inspiration/ Where You Lead live medley ===
"Sweet Inspiration / Where You Lead"
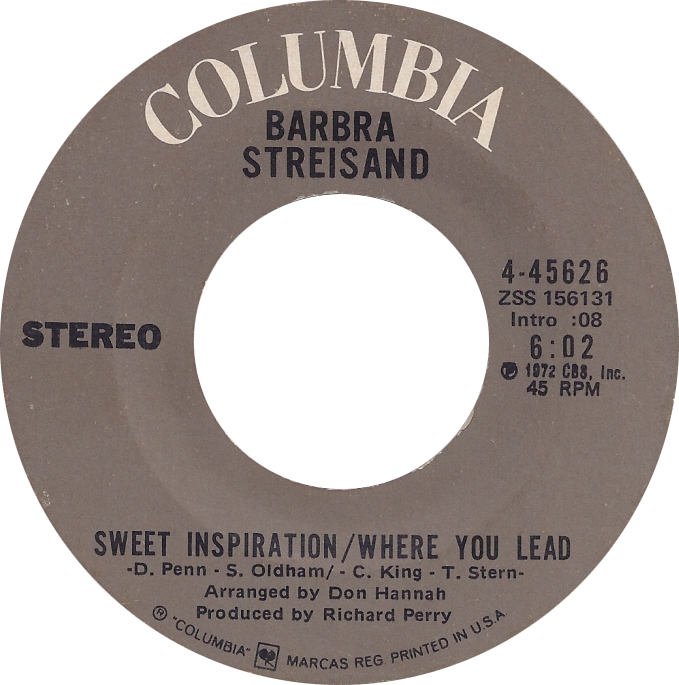
- US single of live recording

Single by Barbra Streisand

from the album Live Concert at the Forum
- B-side: "Didn't We?"
- Released: 25 May 1972
- Studio: The Forum (Inglewood, CA)
- Genre: Easy listening
- Length: album 7:45 single 6:02
- Label: Columbia Records
- Songwriters: Carole King, Toni Stern
- Producer: Richard Perry

Barbra Streisand singles chronology
"Space Captain" (1971)	"Sweet Inspiration" / "Where You Lead" (1972)	"Sing a Song/ Make Your Own Kind of Music" (1972)

The 1972 concert album release Live Concert at the Forum – a recording of Streisand's 15 April 1972 Four for McGovern concert at The Forum (Inglewood CA) – featured "Where You Lead" in a medley entitled "Sweet Inspiration/Where You Lead", Streisand's Forum concert having featured her performance of "Where You Lead" in tandem with "Sweet Inspiration", the latter being a Dan Penn/Spooner Oldham composition written for and first recorded in 1967 by the Sweet Inspirations for whom it had afforded a Top 20 hit reaching #18 on the Billboard Hot 100 in the spring of 1968.

Streisand had premiered the "Sweet Inspiration/Where You Lead" medley during her 24 December 1971 — 14 January 1972 Las Vegas engagement at the International Hotel, the number having been designed by the hotel's musical director Joe Guercio: Guercio had an especial awareness of the song "Sweet Inspiration" as he had begun his seven year tenure as bandleader for Elvis Presley in January 1970, and as Presley's bandleader Guercio worked closely with the Sweet Inspirations who served as Presley's concert chorale and also his opening act.

"Sweet Inspiration/Where You Lead" was released 25 May 1972 as the first advance single from the Live Concert at the Forum (the album would be released October 1972): a left-field choice for single release due to its six minute playing time – also in that Streisand's studio take on "Where You Lead" had been her last-but-two single release with neither interim single proving high-profile – , "Sweet Inspiration/Where You Lead" would approximate the chart impact of the "Where You Lead" single off Barbra Joan Streisand, as the "Sweet Inspiration/ Where You Lead" single peaked at #37 on the Top 40.

Streisand would perform "Sweet Inspiration/Where You Lead" on her Barbra Streisand...and Other Musical Instruments television special which was taped at Elstree Studios in the summer of 1973 and broadcast that 2 November: with Ray Charles on piano and the Raelettes as chorale, Streisand performed an abbreviated version of the medley which ran roughly half the time of the single edit of the Live Concert at the Forum version.

The 1979 compilation Barbra Streisand's Greatest Hits Vol. 2 included "Sweet Inspiration/Where You Lead", while Streisand's studio version of "Where You Lead" was the singer's only Top 40 hit of the relevant time period to be excluded.

=== Charts ===
Year	US Hot 100	US AC	Canada Top 100	Canada AC	Album	Notes
1971	40	3	47	23	Barbra Joan Streisand	
1972	37	15	37	did not chart	Live Concert at the Forum	With "Sweet Inspiration"

== Carole King/Louise Goffin duet version ==
In 2000, Carole King recorded "Where You Lead" as a duet with her daughter Louise Goffin to serve as theme song for the WB television series Gilmore Girls.	Amy Sherman-Palladino on Where You Lead as the Gilmore Girls theme song We were just looking for something that felt classic and you just don't get more classic than Carole King – there's just nobody better. It was a song about connection and it was a song about where you lead, I'll follow – that we'll always be together. And what's interesting is I just wanted to use the song off of Tapestry, and we thought there's no way that was ever going to happen, because how would that happen? We're a tiny show, we don't really exist and Carole King is a legend. And we got to her and what was weird is she said: 'I don't do that song anymore in concert because it's about a woman following a man and I feel that the times are different and I don't want to be singing about a woman following a man. But I love the idea of a mother and a daughter and if I could re-record it with my daughter and turn this song that I wrote into something more relevant, I would love to do that."...And if we were on for a hundred years we would never change that theme song. How could you change that theme song? Good Lord. It's the greatest theme song in the entire world.

Asked by series creator Amy Sherman-Palladino for permission to use the original Tapestry track as the Gilmore Girls theme, King had responded that she'd rather re-record the song for Sherman-Palladino's purpose, with lyrics abridged to reflect the series' theme of a mother-daughter relationship and with King's own daughter Louise Goffin dueting with King. King contacted Toni Stern, co-writer of the song's original version, and Stern tweaked the song's original romantic lyrics so as to be applicable to a mother-daughter relationship, and King and Goffin recorded this new version of "Where You Lead" at the home studio in the Laurel Canyon residence of Goffin and Goffin's then-husband Greg Wells with Wells producing the track.

The full version of the King/Goffin duet of "Where You Lead" had its debut release on the 2002 album Our Little Corner of the World: Music from Gilmore Girls and would be a bonus track on the 2007 deluxe edition release of King's album Love Makes the World, while King and Goffin could be heard singing the song live on King's 2005 concert album The Living Room Tour: in its album appearances the track's title shows as "Where You Lead I Will Follow" although the Gilmore Girls credits identified the song as "Where You Lead". During the 2010 Troubadour Reunion Tour King performed the revised version of "Where You Lead" at some tour venues, singing lead while the tour's co-headliner James Taylor played guitar and sang background vocals.

King and Goffin also duetted on the revised version of "Where You Lead" at King's 3 July 2016 Hyde Park concert which marked the first time King had performed all the songs from Tapestry in a single concert. King addressed her choice to sing the latter day version of "Where You Lead" at Hyde Park with the introductory comments: "The next song I don’t perform very much. It came out just before women’s lib, and it’s got kind of a 'Stand by Your Man' lyric so I [soon] didn't exactly feel comfortable performing it", with King then explaining how the song came to be the Gilmore Girls theme.

In 2022, that version was sung by the title character Joe Kimbreau (James Wolk) in "Snow Globe", the tenth episode of the NBC series Ordinary Joe, accompanied by his son (John Gluck), a children's choir, and his mother Gwen Kimbreau (Anne Ramsay).

== Other versions ==
"Where You Lead" was also recorded by Kate Taylor being featured on her 1971 album Sister Kate. The track featured Carole King on piano (King's husband Charles Larkey also played bass) while the chorale included King and Oma Drake, who was a chorale member on the Barbra Joan Streisand version. Despite these shared elements, AllMusic critic Joe Viglione credited Taylor's version with a "totally different flavor" from those of both King and Streisand. The Sonny and Cher concert album Live in Las Vegas Vol. 2 (1973) featured "Where You Lead" in a medley with "I Can See Clearly Now" and "You've Got a Friend". Versions of "Where You Lead" have also been recorded by Liz Damon's Orient Express (album Try a Little Tenderness, 1971), Iris Williams (album The Many Moods of Iris Williams, 1976), Faith Hill (multi-artist album Tapestry Revisited: A Tribute to Carole King, 1995), Barbara Higbie (album Barbara Higbie's Interpretation of Carole King, 1999), and Marcia Hines (album Marcia Sings Tapestry and the Songs of Carole King, 2010).
