= The Carnegie Hall Concert: June 18, 1971 =

Live album by Carole King
- Released: October 29, 1996 (Original Issue); Remaster: April 21, 2004 (Released in Japan only)
- Recorded: June 18, 1971
- Venue: Carnegie Hall in New York City
- Genre: Rock, pop
- Length: 71:50
- Label: Epic/Sony/Legacy(Original Issue); Sony Music Direct(Remastered CD)
- Producer: Lou Adler

Carole King chronology
Time Gone By (1994)	The Carnegie Hall Concert: June 18, 1971 (1996)	Love Makes the World (2001)

Professional ratings
Review scores
Source	Rating
Allmusic	link

The Carnegie Hall Concert: June 18, 1971 was American musician Carole King's first concert performance in front of an audience.

Performed on June 18, 1971, it was released years later, in 1996, as an album. This album has seventeen live songs. Some songs included: "Will You Love Me Tomorrow?", "You've Got a Friend", "Child of Mine", "I Feel the Earth Move", "It's Too Late", "Beautiful", "(You Make Me Feel Like) A Natural Woman", "After All This Time", "Carry Your Load", "Song of Long Ago" and "Home Again".

James Taylor, a friend of King, accompanied her on "Will You Love Me Tomorrow?", "Up on the Roof", and "You've Got a Friend". Before she started singing, an old saying went into her mind, "How did the man get to Carnegie Hall?" Out loud she said the answer "Practice man, practice!" Then she performed.

== Track listing ==
All songs written and composed by Carole King, except where noted

1. "I Feel the Earth Move" – 3:36
2. "Home Again" – 2:45
3. "After All This Time" – 3:19
4. "Child of Mine" (Gerry Goffin, King) – 4:03
5. "Carry Your Load" – 2:59
6. "No Easy Way Down" – (Goffin, King) 5:32
7. "Song of Long Ago" – 3:24
8. "Snow Queen" (Goffin, King) – 3:51
9. "Smackwater Jack" (Goffin, King) – 3:49
10. "So Far Away" – 4:12
11. "It's Too Late" (King, Toni Stern) – 4:22
12. "Eventually" (Goffin, King) – 4:38
13. "Way Over Yonder" – 4:13
14. "Beautiful" – 2:39
15. "You've Got a Friend" [Performed with James Taylor] – 6:25
16. "Will You Still Love Me Tomorrow?" / "Some Kind of Wonderful" / "Up on the Roof" [medley; performed with James Taylor] (Goffin, King) – 7:46
17. "(You Make Me Feel Like) A Natural Woman" (Goffin, King, Jerry Wexler) – 4:09

== Personnel ==
- Carole King – piano, vocals
- Danny Kortchmar – guitar
- Charles Larkey – bass
- David Campbell etc. – strings (uncredited)
- James Taylor – vocals on "You've Got a Friend" and "Will You Still Love Me Tomorrow?"/"Some Kind of Wonderful"/"Up on the Roof"

== Production ==
- Lou Adler – Producer
- Hank Cicalo – Engineer
- Howard Frank – Project Coordinator for Ode Records
- Ode Sound & Visuals – Art Direction & Photography
- Dave Burle – Art Director
- Stephen K. Peeples – Liner Notes
- Jim McCrary – Photography
