= In Concert (Carole King album) =

Live album by Carole King
- Released: 1994
- Recorded: 1993
- Genre: Pop; rock
- Label: Valley Entertainment
- Producer: Rudy Guess

Carole King chronology
Colour of Your Dreams (1993)	In Concert (1994)	Time Gone By (1994)

Professional ratings
Review scores
Source	Rating
AllMusic	2/5 stars
Rolling Stone	4/5 stars

In Concert is a 1994 concert album by singer-songwriter Carole King.

== Track listing ==
All songs by Carole King, except where noted.

=== Original vinyl / audio tape release ===
Side 1

1. "Hard Rock Cafe"
2. "Up on the Roof" (Gerry Goffin, King)
3. "Smackwater Jack"
4. "So Far Away"
5. "Beautiful"
6. "(You Make Me Feel Like A) Natural Woman" (Goffin, King, Jerry Wexler)
7. "Hold Out for Love"
8. "Will You Love Me Tomorrow (Gerry Goffin, King)

Side 2

1. "Jazzman" (King, David Palmer)
2. "It's Too Late" (King, Toni Stern)
3. "Chains" (Goffin, King)
4. "I Feel the Earth Move"
5. "You've Got a Friend"
6. "Loco-Motion (The)" (Goffin, King)
7. "You've Got a Friend" (reprise)

== Album credits ==
=== Personnel ===
- Carole King – vocals, piano
- Teddy Andreadis – keyboards, piano, harmonica, backing vocals
- Bill Mason – additional keyboards
- Rudy Guess – guitar, backing vocals
- Slash – lead guitar
- Danny Pelfrey – guitar, saxophone, flute, backing vocals
- John Humphrey – bass
- Jerry Angel – drums
- Brie Howard Darling – percussion, backing vocals
- Sherry Goffin – backing vocals
- Linda Lawley – backing vocals
- Voices of Jubilation – choir
- David Crosby & Graham Nash – guest vocalists on "You've Got A Friend"

Technical

- Rudy Guess: Producer
- Bobby Summerfield: Mixing
- Hilton Rosenthal: Executive Producer
- Bernie Grundman: Mastering
- Legal Representative: Emily Simon
- Manager Label Operations: Magda Summerfield
- Project Coordinator: Lorna Guess
- Production Coordinator: Ivy Skoff
- Larry Vigon: Art Direction
- Brian Jackson: Design
- Catherine Wessel: Photography

=== Tour crew ===
- Joe Cardosi and Tim Bernett: Tour Managers
- Lorna Guess: Assistant to Carole King
- Graham Holmes and John Vanderslice: Production Managers
- Chris Rankin: House Sound Engineer
- Ron Reeves and Bernie Bernil: Monitor Engineers
- Mike Ponczek and Jonathan Parke: Audio Technicians
- Rob Zablow: Lighting Designer
- Dennis Connors: Lighting Director
- Sean Harvey and Jerry Swatek: Lighting Technicians
- Alex Axotis: Lighting Operator
- Danny de la Luz: Drum Technician
- Jage Jackson, John Gonzales and Damen Kellihar: Guitar Technicians
- Robbie Eagle and Scott Pinkerton: Keyboard Technicians
- John Bennett: Head of Security
- Beth O'Bryan: Wardrobe
- Dale Lee, Dave Walters, Joe Folke, Bob Bodiglari: Bus Drivers
- David Sutherland, Kenny Rich, Randy Johnson: Truck Drivers
- Jaime Lennox: Alliance For The Wild Rockies Representative
- Ira Koslow: Manager, Peter Asher Management
- Brigette Barr: Project Coordinator, Peter Asher Management
- Nick Men-Meir: Business Manager
- Dan Weiner: Booking Agent, Monterey Peninsula Artists
- Showco, Inc.: Sound Company
- National Audio: Sound Company
- Upstaging, Custom Coach West Busing: Trucking and Lighting
- Ego Trips: Busing

=== Recording credits ===
- Universal Amphitheatre – Los Angeles
- Le Mobile
- Guy Charbonneau: Recording Engineer
- Dr. Dave Gallo: Stage Engineer
- Charlie Bovis: Tape Operator
- Eastman Theatre – Rochester, NY
- Proctor's Theatre – Schenectady, NY
- Bushnell Auditorium – Hartford, CT
- Remote Recording Services, Inc.
- David Hewitt: Recording Engineer
- John McClintock: Stage Engineer
- Phil Gitomer: Tape Operator
- Plus 4 Recording Studios, Los Angeles
- Bobby Summerfield: Post-Production and Mix Engineer
