= Live at the Troubadour (Carole King and James Taylor album) =

Live album by Carole King and James Taylor
- Released: May 4, 2010
- Recorded: November 2007
- Venue: The Troubadour (West Hollywood)
- Genres: Pop, folk
- Length: 63:46
- Label: Hear Music/Concord
- Producer: Peter Asher

Carole King albums chronology
The Living Room Tour (2005)	Live at the Troubadour (2010)

James Taylor albums chronology
Amchitka (2010)	Live at the Troubadour (2010)

Professional ratings
Review scores
Source	Rating
Allmusic	3/5 stars

Live at the Troubadour is a live album by Carole King and James Taylor released in 2010. The album was recorded at The Troubadour in West Hollywood in November 2007 to celebrate the venue's 50th anniversary. It was also the first venue that King and Taylor played together in November 1970.

King and Taylor also mounted the Troubadour Reunion Tour in Australia, New Zealand, Japan and North America during 2010.

The album debuted at No. 4 in the United States with first-week sales of 78,000. This gives James Taylor a top 10 album in every decade since the 1970s and Carole King her first top 10 album since 1976.

Live at the Troubadour has sold over 606,000 copies in the United States.

== Track listing ==
1. "Blossom" (James Taylor) 3:09
2. "So Far Away" (Carole King) 4:41
3. "Machine Gun Kelly" (Danny Kortchmar) 2:59
4. "Carolina in My Mind" (Taylor) 4:16
5. "It's Too Late" (King, Toni Stern) 4:59
6. "Smackwater Jack" (Gerry Goffin, King) 5:25
7. "Something in the Way She Moves" (Taylor) 4:04
8. "Will You Love Me Tomorrow" (Goffin, King) 4:12
9. "Country Road" (Taylor) 3:49
10. "Fire and Rain" (Taylor) 5:44
11. "Sweet Baby James" (Taylor) 3:34
12. "I Feel the Earth Move" (King) 4:05
13. "You've Got a Friend" (King) 5:51
14. "Up on the Roof" (Goffin, King) 4:09
15. "You Can Close Your Eyes" (Taylor) 2:49

== Personnel ==
- Carole King – vocals, piano
- James Taylor – vocals, guitar, harmonica
- Danny Kortchmar – guitar
- Leland Sklar – bass guitar
- Russ Kunkel – drums

== Charts ==
Chart (2010)	Peak position
Canadian Albums Chart	16
Dutch Albums Chart	76
European Top 100 Albums	66
New Zealand Albums Chart	4
Norwegian Albums Chart	24
Spanish Albums Chart	39
UK Albums Chart	33
US Billboard 200	4

=== Year-end charts ===
Chart (2010)	Position
US Billboard 200	54

== Certifications ==
Region	Certification	Certified units/sales
Australia (ARIA) Audiovisual certification	Gold	7,500^{^}
United States (RIAA)	Gold	500,000^{^}
United States (RIAA) Video	6× Platinum	600,000^{^}
^{^} Shipments figures based on certification alone.
