= 14th Annual Grammy Awards =

1972 US music awards ceremony

- Date: March 14, 1972
- Location: Felt Forum, New York City
- Hosted by: Andy Williams
- Most awards: Carole King (4)
- Most nominations: Isaac Hayes (8)

Television/radio coverage
- Network: ABC

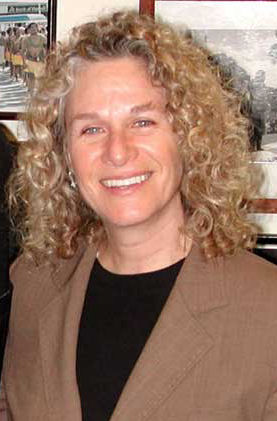
Carole King's Tapestry won all four awards it was nominated for, including three of the Big Four awards.

The 14th Annual Grammy Awards were held on March 14, 1972, and were broadcast live on television in the United States by ABC; the following year, they would move the telecasts to CBS, where they would remain until 2026 when they will return to ABC in 2027 after 55 years. They recognized accomplishments by musicians from the year 1971.

== Performers ==
- The cast of Godspell - "Prepare Ye the Way of the Lord"/"Day by Day"
- Ain’t Nobody Home - B. B. King
- Theme from Shaft - Isaac Hayes
- Superstar (the Carpenters song) - The Carpenters
- When You're Hot, You're Hot - Jerry Reed
- You Brought The Joy - Freda Payne
- The Bill Evans Trio
- Joy to the World (Three Dog Night song) - Three Dog Night
- Good Lovin' (Makes It Right) - Tammy Wynette
- My Sweet Lord - George Harrison (archive footage only)

== Presenters ==
- Anthony Newley & Florence Henderson - Best Score From An Original Cast Show Album
- The 5th Dimension - Best Pop Vocal Performance By A Duo Or Group
- Ed Sullivan - Best Comedy Recording
- Andy Williams - Presented the Trustees Award to The Beatles and presented a preview of the upcoming film The Concert for Bangladesh
- The Carpenters & Herb Alpert - Record of the Year
- Richard Harris - Best Original Score Written For Motion Picture Or Television Show
- The Temptations - Best Female R&B Vocal Performance
- Bobby Darin & Aretha Franklin - Best Jazz Performance
- Henry Mancini - Album Of The Year
- Andy Williams - Song Of The Year
- Roberta Flack & Smokey Robinson - Best Male R&B Vocal Performance
- Loretta Lynn & Conway Twitty - Best Male Country Vocal Performance

== Award winners ==
=== General field ===
- Record of the Year
  - Lou Adler (producer) & Carole King for "It's Too Late"
- Album of the Year
  - Lou Adler (producer) & Carole King for Tapestry
- Song of the Year
  - Carole King (songwriter) for "You've Got a Friend"
- Best New Artist
  - Carly Simon

=== Children's ===
- Best Recording for Children
  - Bill Cosby for Bill Cosby Talks to Kids About Drugs

=== Classical ===
- Best Classical Performance – Orchestra
  - Carlo Maria Giulini (conductor) & the Chicago Symphony Orchestra for Mahler: Symphony No. 1 in D
- Best Classical Vocal Soloist Performance
  - Leontyne Price for Leontyne Price Sings Robert Schumann
- Best Opera Recording
  - Richard Mohr (producer), Erich Leinsdorf (conductor), Grace Bumbry, Plácido Domingo, Sherrill Milnes, Leontyne Price, Ruggero Raimondi, the John Aldis Choir & the London Symphony Orchestra for Verdi: Aida
- Best Choral Performance, Classical
  - Colin Davis (conductor), Russell Burgess, Arthur Oldham (choir directors) the Wandsworth School Boys Choir & the London Symphony Orchestra & Chorus for Berlioz: Requiem
- Best Classical Performance – Instrumental Soloist or Soloists (with orchestra)
  - André Previn (conductor), Julian Bream & the London Symphony Orchestra for Villa-Lobos: Concerto for Guitar
- Best Classical Performance – Instrumental Soloist or Soloists (without orchestra)
  - Vladimir Horowitz for Horowitz Plays Rachmaninoff (Etudes-Tableaux Piano Music; Sonatas)
- Best Chamber Music Performance
  - The Juilliard String Quartet for Debussy: Quartet in G Minor/Ravel: Quartet in F
- Album of the Year, Classical
  - Thomas Frost, Richard Killough (producers) & Vladimir Horowitz for Horowitz Plays Rachmaninoff (Etudes-Tableaux Piano Music; Sonatas)

=== Comedy ===
- Best Comedy Recording
  - Lily Tomlin for This Is a Recording

=== Composing and arranging ===
- Best Instrumental Composition
  - Michel LeGrand (composer) for "Theme From Summer of '42"
- Best Original Score Written for a Motion Picture or a Television Special
  - Isaac Hayes (composer) for Shaft
- Best Instrumental Arrangement
  - Isaac Hayes & Johnny Allen (arrangers) for "Theme From Shaft" performed by Isaac Hayes
- Best Arrangement Accompanying Vocalist(s)
  - Paul McCartney (arranger) for "Uncle Albert/Admiral Halsey" performed by Paul & Linda McCartney

=== Country ===
- Best Country Vocal Performance, Female
  - Sammi Smith for "Help Me Make It Through the Night"
- Best Country Vocal Performance, Male
  - Jerry Reed for "When You're Hot, You're Hot"
- Best Country Vocal Performance by a Duo or Group
  - Loretta Lynn & Conway Twitty for "After the Fire Is Gone"
- Best Country Instrumental Performance
  - Chet Atkins for "Snowbird"
- Best Country Song
  - Kris Kristofferson (songwriter) for "Help Me Make It Through the Night" performed by Sammi Smith

=== Folk ===
- Best Ethnic or Traditional Recording
  - Muddy Waters for They Call Me Muddy Waters

=== Gospel ===
- Best Gospel Performance (other than soul gospel)
  - Charley Pride for "Let Me Live"
- Best Soul Gospel Performance
  - Shirley Caesar for Put Your Hand in the Hand of the Man From Galilee
- Best Sacred Performance
  - Charley Pride for Did You Think to Pray

=== Jazz ===
- Best Jazz Performance by a Soloist
  - Bill Evans for The Bill Evans Album performed by the Bill Evans Trio
- Best Jazz Performance by a Group
  - Bill Evans for The Bill Evans Album performed by the Bill Evans Trio
- Best Jazz Performance by a Big Band
  - Duke Ellington for "New Orleans Suite"

=== Musical show ===
- Best Score from an Original Cast Show Album
  - Stephen Schwartz (composer & producer) & the original cast for Godspell

=== Packaging and notes ===
- Best Album Cover
  - Dean O. Torrence (art director) & Gene Brownell (photographer) for Pollution performed by Pollution
- Best Album Notes
  - Sam Samudio (notes writer) for Sam, Hard and Heavy performed by Sam Samudio

=== Pop ===
- Best Pop Vocal Performance, Female
  - Carole King for Tapestry
- Best Pop Vocal Performance, Male
  - James Taylor for "You've Got a Friend"
- Best Pop Vocal Performance by a Duo or Group
  - The Carpenters for Carpenters
- Best Pop Instrumental Performance
  - Quincy Jones for Smackwater Jack

=== Production and engineering ===
- Best Engineered Recording, Non-Classical
  - Henry Bush, Ron Capone & Dave Purple (engineers) for "Theme From Shaft" performed by Isaac Hayes
- Best Classical Engineered Recording
  - Vittorio Negri (engineer), Colin Davis (conductor), the Wandsworth School Boys Choir & the London Symphony Orchestra for Berlioz: Requiem

=== R&B ===
- Best R&B Vocal Performance, Female
  - Aretha Franklin for "Bridge Over Troubled Water"
- Best R&B Vocal Performance, Male
  - Lou Rawls for "A Natural Man"
- Best R&B Vocal Performance by a Group
  - Ike & Tina Turner for "Proud Mary"
- Best Rhythm & Blues Song
  - Bill Withers for "Ain't No Sunshine"

=== Spoken ===
- Best Spoken Word Recording
  - Les Crane for "Desiderata"
