= Now and Forever (Carole King song) =

- Japanese retail CD single

Single by Carole King

from the album League of Their Own and Colour of Your Dreams
- Released: Summer 1992
- Recorded: February 1992 Madhatter Studios
- Genre: Pop / Rock
- Length: 3:14
- Label: Columbia
- Songwriter(s): Carole King

Carole King singles chronology
"City Streets" (1989)	"'Now and Forever'" (1992)	"Love Makes the World" (2001)

"Now and Forever" is a song written and recorded by Carole King for the major motion picture A League of Their Own. The song was written in 1992 solely by King and recorded the same year. The song became a hit on the US AC chart, and King received a Grammy Award nomination for it.

== History ==
Carole King was asked to write and record the end title song to the film A League of Their Own by Penny Marshall, the director of the movie. As the end title section is a very prestigious part of a movie, Carole King gladly accepted the offer. Carole King wrote the song, and she stated that she and Penny Marshall both liked it. Everything was set for King to record the song as the end title song, but one day Carole King received a phone call from Penny Marshall. Penny Marshall stated that a problem had occurred: Madonna was in the movie and was entitled under her contract to record the end title song. As she said in her Welcome to My Living Room DVD, Carole King felt "bummed." However, Marshall was still determined to get King's song in the movie. Therefore, Penny had a new opening of the movie written and filmed and put King's song in the beginning.

== Recordings and appearances ==
The original version of "Now and Forever" was recorded in 1992 and originally appears on the soundtrack from the movie. In 1993, Carole King released an album, Colour of Your Dreams, and put the song on that album. It is the same version as the recording on the soundtrack.

In 2005 Carole King released her live The Living Room Tour album. "Now and Forever" is track four on this album.

On January 12, 2006, Dana Reeve, wife of Christopher Reeve, sang the song live at Madison Square Garden in honor of New York Rangers hockey player Mark Messier.

== Reception ==
Kara Manning in a 1993 Rolling Stone review described the song as "replete with wistful vocals encircling deceptively simple melodies." Steve Morse in a 1993 Boston Globe review called it one of "standouts" of the 1993 album Colour of Your Dreams. In a 2009 NPR interview, a phone caller reminded Carole King that the song and the film A League of Their Own was one of her and her grandmother's favorites.

== Personnel ==
- Carole King - Piano, Vocals
- Robbie Kondor - Synthesizer
- Rudy Guess - Guitar
- John Humphrey - Bass
- Jerry Angel - Drums

== Charts ==
Year	Chart	Position
1992	Polish Music Charts	39
1992	US AC	18
