= Love Makes the World =

Studio album by Carole King
- Released: September 25, 2001
- Recorded: 1998–2001
- Studios: Westlake Studios (Los Angeles, California); Brandon's Way Recording (Hollywood, California); Chartmaker Studios (Malibu, California); The Rude Stude (Studio City, California); The Ranch (Seattle, Washington); Paradise Sound (Index, Washington); The Fire Station (San Marcos, Texas); The Hit Factory (New York City, New York)
- Genres: Pop rock, soft rock, blue-eyed soul
- Length: 44:11
- Label: KOCH/Rockingale
- Producers: Carole King; Humberto Gatica; Pop Rox; Kenny "Babyface" Edmonds; David Foster

Carole King chronology
The Carnegie Hall Concert: June 18, 1971 (1996)	Love Makes the World (2001)	The Living Room Tour (2005)

Professional ratings
Review scores
Source	Rating
Allmusic	3/5 stars
Music Box	1.5/5 stars

Love Makes the World is the sixteenth studio album by American singer-songwriter Carole King, released on September 25, 2001. Distributed by Koch Records, it was her first release on her Rockingale Records label. As of 2025, it is her most recent album of new material.

During the release for the album, King appeared in a series of television advertisements for Gap, in which her daughter Louise Goffin performs "So Far Away" and King performs "Love Makes the World".

== Track listing ==
1. "Love Makes the World" (Sam Hollander, Carole King, Dave Schommer) – 4:23
2. "You Can Do Anything" (Babyface, King, Carole Bayer Sager) – 3:58
3. "The Reason" (Back vocals by Celine Dion) (Mark Hudson, King, Greg Wells) – 4:39
4. "I Wasn't Gonna Fall in Love" (King, Sager) – 4:04
5. "I Don't Know" (Paul Brady, Gary Burr, Hudson, King) – 3:04
6. "Oh No, Not My Baby" (Gerry Goffin, King) – 3:28
7. "It Could Have Been Anyone" (David Foster, King, Sager) – 3:53
8. "Monday Without You" (Brady, Hudson, King) – 4:02
9. "An Uncommon Love" (Rob Hyman, King, Rich Wayland) – 3:34
10. "You Will Find Me There" (Joel Campbell, King) – 4:25
11. "Safe Again" (King) – 2:42
12. "This Time" (King) – 3:42

Japanese edition additional track

1. "Birthday Song" (King) – 3:16

== Deluxe edition ==
On May 8, 2007, a Love Makes the World: Deluxe Edition 2-disc set was released. The first disc contains all of the songs Love Makes the World does and the second disc features bonus songs and videos.

=== Deluxe Edition track listing ===
Disc 1:

1. "Love Makes the World" (Sam Hollander, Carole King, Dave Schommer)
2. "You Can Do Anything" (Babyface, King, Carole Bayer Sager)
3. "The Reason" (Mark Hudson, King, Greg Wells)
4. "I Wasn't Gonna Fall In Love" (King, Sager)
5. "I Don't Know" (Paul Brady, Gary Burr, Hudson, King)
6. "Oh No Not My Baby" (Gerry Goffin, King)
7. "It Could Have Been Anyone" (David Foster, King, Sager)
8. "Monday Without You" (Rob Hyman, King, Rich Wayland)
9. "An Uncommon Love"(Campbell, King)
10. "You Will Find Me There" (King)
11. "Safe Again" (King)
12. "This Time" (King)

Disc 2: enhanced bonus disc – audio tracks:

1. "Birthday Song" (King)
2. "Love for Christmas" (King, Sager)
3. "Where You Lead, I Will Follow" (King, Toni Stern)
4. "Lo Que Tú Eres Para Mí" (King, Alejandro Lerner)
5. "Two Hearts" (King, Graham Nash)

Video tracks:

1. "Love Makes the World" – Music Video
2. "Safe Again" – Music Video
3. Behind-the-Scenes featurette
4. Video Interview with Carole King

== Personnel ==
Musicians

- Carole King – lead vocals, acoustic piano
- Dave Schommer – programming (1), percussion (1)
- Kenny "Babyface" Edmonds – keyboards (2), guitars (2), drum programming (2)
- Lester Mendez – programming (3, 4)
- C.J. Vanston – programming (3, 10, 12), acoustic piano (10), track arrangements (12)
- David Foster – acoustic piano (7), keyboards (7)
- Simon Franglen – programming (7)
- Paul Brady – acoustic piano (8)
- Randy Waldman – programming (9), keyboards (11)
- Steve Hamilton – acoustic guitar (1), electric guitar (1)
- Michael Landau – guitars (3–5)
- Greg Wells – guitars (3, 4), drums (3, 8)
- Gary Burr – acoustic guitar (5, 8)
- Rudy Guess – electric guitar (5, 12), guitars (7)
- Rusty Anderson – electric guitar (8)
- Paul Jackson Jr. – electric guitar (10)
- Dean Parks – acoustic guitar (12), electric guitar (12)
- Nathan East – bass (2, 4, 7, 8, 10–12)
- Armand Sabal-Lecco – bass (3, 5)
- Charlie Larkey – acoustic bass (6, 9)
- Michael McCoy – drum programming (5)
- Russ Kunkel – drums (12)
- Michael Fisher – percussion (2, 4, 5, 8, 10, 12)
- David Boruff – saxophone (1)
- David Shostac – flute (11)
- Barbara Northcutt – oboe (11)
- Wynton Marsalis – trumpet (4)
- James Thatcher – French horn (11)

Strings on "An Uncommon Love"

- Carole King – string arrangements
- Armen Ksajikian and John Walz – cello
- Brian Dembow and David Walther – violin
- Jackie Brand, Julie Gigante, Endre Granat, Amy Hershberger, Miran Kojian and Rafael Rishik – violin

Background vocalists

- Carole King – backing vocals, vocal arrangements
- Danny Woods – additional backing vocals (1)
- Babyface – backing vocals (2), vocal arrangements (2)
- Celine Dion – featured and backing vocals (3)
- Paul Brady – backing vocals (5, 8)
- Gary Burr – backing vocals (5, 8)
- Mark Hudson – backing vocals (5, 8)
- Steven Tyler – additional backing vocals (8)
- k.d. lang – additional vocals (9)

== Production ==
- Carole Bayer Sager – executive producer
- Carole King – producer
- Humberto Gatica – producer (1, 3–6, 8–12)
- Rox Pop – producers (1)
- Babyface – producer (2)
- David Foster – producer (7)
- Stacey Crockett – album coordinator
- Kristine Ezrin – album coordinator
- Lisa Goich-Andreadis – album coordinator
- Lorna Guess – album coordinator
- Rudy Guess – album coordinator
- Vigon/Ellis – art direction, design
- Joyce Tenneson – photography

Technical credits

- Steve Kadison – mastering
- Vlado Meller – mastering
- Sony Music Studios (New York City, New York) – mastering location
- Bobby Arnold – recording
- Paul Boutin – recording
- Chris Brooke – recording, assistant engineer
- Felipe Elgueta – recording
- Humberto Gatica – recording, mixing
- Erik Gillberg – recording
- Rudy Guess – recording
- Michael McCoy – recording
- Alejandro Rodriguez – recording
- Jesse Gorman – assistant engineer
- Kevin Guarnieri – assistant engineer
- Kevin Myers – assistant engineer
- Cesar Ramirez – assistant engineer
- Cristian Robles – assistant engineer
- Fredrik Sarhagen – assistant engineer
- Michael Tocci – assistant engineer
- Pablo Mungia – Pro Tools engineer
- Kenny O'Brien – vocal editing
