= Tapestry Revisited: A Tribute to Carole King =

1995 compilation album

Compilation album by various artists
- Released: October 31, 1995
- Recorded: 1995
- Label: Atlantic
- Producers: Emosia; David Foster; Scott Hendricks; Stewart Lerman; Nigel Lowis; Arif Mardin; Richard Marx; Tim O'Brien; C.P. Roth; Curtis Stigers; Keith Thomas

Professional ratings
Review scores
Source	Rating
AllMusic	2/5 stars

Tapestry Revisited: A Tribute to Carole King is a 1995 tribute album honoring American singer, songwriter, and pianist Carole King. It features a diverse lineup of artists including Richard Marx, Aretha Franklin, Rod Stewart, Celine Dion, The Bee Gees and Amy Grant. The idea of this release was to re-create King's 1971 album Tapestry track-for-track using other artists.

The album peaked at number 53 on the Billboard 200 and was certified Gold by the RIAA in the United States.

== Track listing ==
All tracks are written by Carole King, except where indicated.

No.	Title	Writer(s)	Performer(s)	Length
1.	"I Feel the Earth Move"		Eternal	4:59
2.	"So Far Away"		Rod Stewart	4:25
3.	"It's Too Late"	Carole King; Toni Stern	Amy Grant	3:59
4.	"Home Again"		Curtis Stigers	3:41
5.	"Beautiful"		Richard Marx	3:46
6.	"Way Over Yonder"		Blessid Union of Souls	3:54
7.	"You've Got a Friend"		BeBe & CeCe Winans featuring Aretha Franklin	6:03
8.	"Where You Lead"	King; Stern	Faith Hill	3:32
9.	"Will You Love Me Tomorrow"	King; Gerry Goffin	Bee Gees	5:02
10.	"Smackwater Jack"	King; Goffin	The Manhattan Transfer	4:37
11.	"Tapestry"		All-4-One	3:12
12.	"(You Make Me Feel Like) A Natural Woman"	King; Goffin; Jerry Wexler	Celine Dion	3:43
Total length:				50:53

== Charts ==
Chart performance for Tapestry Revisited: A Tribute to Carole King
Chart (1995)	Peak position
Australian Albums (ARIA)	89
US Billboard 200	53
