= Tapestry (Carole King album) =

Studio album by Carole King
- Released: February 10, 1971
- Recorded: January 1971
- Studios: A&M, Hollywood
- Genres: Soft rock; pop
- Length: 44:31
- Labels: Ode; A&M
- Producer: Lou Adler

Carole King chronology
Writer (1970)	Tapestry (1971)	Music (1971)

Singles from Tapestry
- 1. "It's Too Late"/"I Feel the Earth Move" Released: April 1971; 2. "So Far Away" Released: August 1971

Tapestry is the second studio album by the American singer-songwriter Carole King. Produced by Lou Adler, it was released on February 10, 1971, through Ode Records. The album's lead single, "It's Too Late" / "I Feel the Earth Move", spent five weeks at number one on both the Billboard Hot 100 and Easy Listening charts.

The album has received critical acclaim since its release and is widely regarded as one of the greatest albums of all time. It won four Grammy Awards at the 14th Annual Grammy Awards in 1972, including Album of the Year, Song of the Year, and Record of the Year. Tapestry has been certified 14× Platinum by the Recording Industry Association of America (RIAA), making it one of the best-selling albums of all time. It was inducted into the Grammy Hall of Fame in 1998 and into the National Recording Registry in 2003.

== Production ==
King began her career as a songwriter in the early 1960s, often in collaboration with her first husband Gerry Goffin. She wrote and co-wrote a string of hit songs performed mostly by other artists—a notable exception being her 1962 hit "It Might as Well Rain Until September"—before deciding to sing her own material professionally.

King wrote or co-wrote all the songs on the album. Two songs were co-written with Toni Stern: "It's Too Late" and "Where You Lead"; King wrote the music and Stern the lyrics. King's ex-husband Gerry Goffin co-wrote the lyrics for three of the songs, two of which had already been hits for other artists: Aretha Franklin's "(You Make Me Feel Like) A Natural Woman" (in 1967), and The Shirelles' "Will You Love Me Tomorrow" (in 1960).

James Taylor, who encouraged King to sing her own songs and who also played on Tapestry, had a number one hit with "You've Got a Friend" later in 1971.

The album was recorded at A&M Studios' Studio B in January 1971 with the support of Taylor, Joni Mitchell, and various experienced session musicians. Several of the musicians worked simultaneously on Taylor's album Mud Slide Slim and the Blue Horizon. The Carpenters were recording their self-titled third album in Studio A, while Mitchell was recording her album Blue in Studio C.

A&M staff photographer Jim McCrary took the cover photograph in the living room of King's home at 8815 Appian Way, Laurel Canyon, California. It shows her sitting barefoot on a cushion on a bench beside a window, holding a tapestry that she had hand-stitched, with her cat Telemachus, named after the mythological son of Odysseus, near her foot.

== Critical reception ==
Professional ratings
Review scores
Source	Rating
AllMusic	5/5 stars
Christgau's Record Guide	A−
The Encyclopedia of Popular Music	5/5 stars
The Great Rock Discography	8/10
Music Story	5/5 stars
MusicHound Rock	5/5 stars
Pitchfork	10/10
The Rolling Stone Album Guide	5/5 stars
Uncut	4/5 stars

Released on February 10, 1971, through Ode Records, Tapestry was met with widespread critical acclaim. Jon Landau of Rolling Stone wrote that King was one of the most creative pop music figures and had made an album of "surpassing personal intimacy and musical accomplishment". The Village Voice critic Robert Christgau wrote that her voice, free of "technical decorum", would liberate female singers; in the publication's annual Pazz & Jop poll, Tapestry ranked as the year's 10th best album.

In a retrospective review for AllMusic, Jason Ankeny called Tapestry a "remarkably expressive and intimate record" and a "work of consummate craftsmanship". Praising King's songwriting and performances, he concluded, "in its time it connected with listeners like few records before it, and it remains an illuminating experience decades later." Writing for Pitchfork, Jenn Pelly said that Tapestry turned King from a "master songwriter" into a "music legend". Discussing its impact, she writes that the album remains timeless because its songs feel human, comforting, and embrace reality.

=== Awards ===
Along with being selected Album of the Year, Tapestry received Grammys for Best Female Pop Vocal Performance, Record of the Year ("It's Too Late"), and Song of the Year ("You've Got a Friend") at the 14th Annual Grammy Awards, making King the first solo female artist to win the Grammy Award for Record of the Year and the first woman to win the Grammy Award for Song of the Year. It was also the most awards a single artist had received in one ceremony up to that point.

The album remained on the Billboard charts for 313 weeks (second only to Pink Floyd's The Dark Side of the Moon's 724 weeks).

== Commercial performance ==
Carole King's Tapestry is a triumph of mass culture. In less than two years it has sold well over five million copies, putting it in a class with the best-selling albums of all time, and it is still on the charts … Such statistics are so overwhelming that they seem to transform a mere record into some sort of ineluctable cultural presence, and in a sense they do.

— Robert Christgau (Newsday, November 1972)

Tapestry was a huge commercial success. It spent 15 consecutive weeks at number one on the U.S. Billboard 200. It still holds the record for most consecutive weeks at number one by a female solo artist. The album also spent more than six years on the Billboard 200 chart (318 weeks), including 302 consecutive weeks. For more than 40 years, it held the record for the longest-charting album by a female solo artist in the U.S., until Adele's 21 broke the record in 2017. As of 2021, Tapestry was certified 14 times platinum in the U.S. and had sold around 25 million copies worldwide.

In Canada, Tapestry spent nine weeks at number one beginning July 3, 1971. It was on the Top 100 chart from April 14, 1971, to January 20, 1973, and again from September 22, 1973, to February 16, 1974. In the United Kingdom, the album debuted at number 32 on UK Albums Chart and eventually rose to number four, spending 136 weeks in the Top 100.

== Cultural impact ==
"Later in her songwriting career, Carole had to be coaxed to step out front and perform her songs herself. And what a moment in music history that was. With Tapestry, she became one of the most successful female artists of all time. Her persona on Tapestry feels like listening to a close friend intimately sharing the truths of her life so that you can discover the truths of your own. It feels like sage wisdom, gentle comfort and reassurance that you aren’t alone in this life. It was a watershed moment for humans in the world who have feelings, and for cats who had big dreams of one day ending up on iconic album covers."

— Taylor Swift, inducting King into the Rock and Roll Hall of Fame in 2021

King had been writing hit songs for a decade, but Tapestry was her first project to win her international acclaim as a singer. Several songs from the album were recorded by other artists and became hits while the album was still on the charts: James Taylor's 1971 recording of "You've Got a Friend" from Mud Slide Slim and the Blue Horizon hit number one in the U.S. and number four in the U.K., and Barbra Streisand's 1971 studio recording of "Where You Lead" from her album Barbra Joan Streisand reached number 40, while a live recording of a medley in which Streisand paired the song with the Sweet Inspirations' hit "Sweet Inspiration" from her album Live Concert at the Forum reached number 37 the following year.

Various artists have rerecorded material from Tapestry in tribute albums. The first, released in 1995 and titled Tapestry Revisited: A Tribute to Carole King, was certified gold. The second, in 2003, was titled A New Tapestry – Carole King Tribute. In 2010, Australian recording artist Marcia Hines recorded a tribute album, Marcia Sings Tapestry.

Other musicians have also praised the album. British singer Amy Winehouse said in a 2004 interview that her mother "loved" the album, and that it was "always in the house". In a 2007 article for Mojo magazine, singer Tori Amos said that King's songs "are like stories or sonic movies", and that "I Feel the Earth Move" and "It's Too Late" make the listener "want to walk into them".

In 2015, in its sixth and final season, American TV series Glee paid tribute to the album in its episode "Jagged Little Tapestry". Five songs from Tapestry are performed by various artists. Two of them, "It's Too Late" and "So Far Away", are performed on their own, while the other three are used in a mashup with a song from Alanis Morissette's Jagged Little Pill. "I Feel the Earth Move" is mashed up with "Hand in My Pocket", "Will You Love Me Tomorrow?" with "Head Over Feet", and "You've Got a Friend" with "You Learn". The episode was watched by 1.98 million viewers and received a 0.7/2 in the adult 18–49 demographic.

In March 2016, it was announced that King would perform the album live in its entirety for the first time at the British Summer Time Festival in Hyde Park, London, on July 3, 2016. The performance was released the following year as Tapestry: Live at Hyde Park.

=== Rankings ===
Tapestry has appeared on critics' lists of the best albums. In 2000, it ranked 74th in Colin Larkin's All Time Top 1000 Albums. VH1 ranked the album 39th on its list of 100 Greatest Albums, while Time magazine included it in a similar list. In 2003, it ranked 36th on Rolling Stone's 500 Greatest Albums of All Time, maintaining that rating in a 2012 revised list and moving up to 25th in the 2020 revision. In 2014, the magazine included the album in its list of the 40 most groundbreaking albums of all time, writing that with Tapestry, "Not only did King secure a foothold for women as hit songwriters, but as a singer, she broke down the double-standard that allowed men like Bob Dylan to use their imperfect voices to express personality, but constrained women to harsher standards of precision." In 2013, NME ranked Tapestry 82nd on its list of the 500 Greatest Albums of All Time. In 2024, Paste ranked Tapestry 33rd on its list of the 300 greatest albums of all time. Staff writer Matt Melis called it "arguably the definitive singer-songwriter album of the early '70s".

In 1998, the album was inducted into the Grammy Hall of Fame. In 2003, Tapestry was one of 50 recordings chosen to be added to the National Recording Registry for preservation in the Library of Congress as "culturally, historically, or aesthetically important". The album is also included in the 2018 edition of Robert Dimery's book 1001 Albums You Must Hear Before You Die.

== Track listing ==
All songs written by Carole King except where noted.

Side 1
No.	Title	Writer(s)	Length
1.	"I Feel the Earth Move"		3:00
2.	"So Far Away"		3:54
3.	"It's Too Late"	Toni Stern, King	3:51
4.	"Home Again"		2:29
5.	"Beautiful"		3:08
6.	"Way Over Yonder"		4:49

Side 2
No.	Title	Writer(s)	Length
1.	"You've Got a Friend"		5:09
2.	"Where You Lead"	Stern, King	3:20
3.	"Will You Love Me Tomorrow"	Gerry Goffin, King	4:13
4.	"Smackwater Jack"	Goffin, King	3:42
5.	"Tapestry"		3:15
6.	"(You Make Me Feel Like) A Natural Woman"	Goffin, King, Jerry Wexler	3:59
Total length:			44:31

1999 CD reissue bonus tracks
No.	Title	Length
13.	"Out in the Cold"	2:44
14.	"Smackwater Jack (Live in Boston, May 21, 1973)"	3:21

2008 "Legacy Edition"

In 2008, Sony/BMG, Epic, and Ode released a two-disc "Legacy Edition". One disc is the original album remastered; the second is live performances of 11 of the 12 songs, recorded in 1973 in Boston; Columbia, Maryland; and Central Park, New York; and in 1976 at the San Francisco Opera House ("Where You Lead" is the song not included on the live disc).

Live disc track listing
No.	Title	Length
1.	"I Feel the Earth Move"	4:17
2.	"So Far Away"	4:44
3.	"It's Too Late"	5:06
4.	"Home Again"	3:33
5.	"Beautiful"	3:39
6.	"Way Over Yonder"	5:35
7.	"You've Got a Friend"	6:00
8.	"Will You Love Me Tomorrow?"	4:31
9.	"Smackwater Jack"	4:18
10.	"Tapestry"	4:13
11.	"(You Make Me Feel Like) A Natural Woman"	5:11

== Personnel ==
- Carole King – lead and backing vocals, keyboards (1, 5, 11, 12), piano (2–4, 6–10)
- Ralph Schuckett – electric piano (3, 8, 10)
- Danny Kootch – electric guitar (1, 3, 6, 8, 10), acoustic guitar (9), congas (3, 5, 7)
- James Taylor – acoustic guitar (2, 4, 6, 7, 9), backing vocals (9)
- Charles Larkey – electric bass (1–3, 5, 6, 8, 10), string bass (4, 7, 9, 12)
- Joel O'Brien – drums (1, 3, 5, 6, 10)
- Russ Kunkel – drums (2, 4, 8, 9)
- Curtis Amy – flute (2), soprano saxophone (3), tenor saxophone (6), baritone saxophone (10)
- Barry Socher – violin (6, 7)
- David Campbell – viola (6, 7)
- Terry King – cello (6, 7)
- Perry Steinberg – string bass (6)
- Merry Clayton – backing vocals (6, 8, 10)
- Julia Tillman – backing vocals (8, 10)
- Joni Mitchell – backing vocals (9)

Technical

- Lou Adler – producer
- Hank Cicalo – engineering
- Vic Anesini – mastering
- Roland Young – art direction
- Chuck Beeson – design
- Jim McCrary – photography
- Michael Putland – photograph on CD tray of 1999 re-release
- Bob Irwin – production for 1999 re-release
- Jessica Killorin – product manager for 1999 re-release
- Smay Vision – design for 1999 re-release

== Charts ==
=== Weekly charts ===
Original release

Chart (1971)	Position
Australian Kent Music Report	3
Canadian RPM Albums Chart	1
Japanese Oricon LPs Chart	1
Norwegian Albums Chart	8
Spanish Albums Chart	1
UK Albums Chart	4
U.S. Billboard Top LPs	1

=== Year-end charts ===
Chart (1971)	Position
Australian Albums Chart	10
UK Albums Chart	7
U.S. Billboard 200	2
Chart (1972)	Position
U.S. Billboard 200	2
Chart (1973)	Position
U.S. Billboard 200	22
Chart (2018)	Position
Australian Albums (ARIA)	95

=== All-time charts ===
All-time chart performance for Tapestry
Chart	Position
U.S. Billboard 200	10
U.S. Billboard 200 (Women)	4

== Certifications and sales ==
Region	Certification	Certified units/sales
Australia (ARIA)	8× Platinum	560,000^{‡}
Japan (RIAJ) 1991 reissue	Gold	100,000^{^}
New Zealand (RMNZ)	Platinum	15,000^{^}
United Kingdom (BPI)	2× Platinum	600,000^{*}
United States (RIAA)	14× Platinum	14,000,000^{‡}
^{*} Sales figures based on certification alone.^{^} Shipments figures based on certification alone.^{‡} Sales+streaming figures based on certification alone.

== See also ==
- List of best-selling albums
- List of best-selling albums by women
