= Jim McCrary =

American photographer

Jim McCrary (August 31, 1939 – April 29, 2012) was an American photographer known for his 1970s album covers, most notably Carole King's Tapestry, The Carpenters' Ticket to Ride, and Joe Cocker's Mad Dogs and Englishmen.
