= Writer (album) =

Studio album by Carole King
- Released: May 1970
- Recorded: March–April 1970
- Studios: Crystal Sound, Hollywood
- Genres: Soft rock; pop
- Length: 44:11
- Labels: Ode / A&M (Original Issue); Ode / Epic (Re-issue)
- Producer: John Fischbach

Carole King chronology
Writer (1970)	Tapestry (1971)

Professional ratings
Review scores
Source	Rating
AllMusic	3/5 stars
Christgau's Record Guide	B
Music Week	2/4 stars

Writer is the debut studio album by American singer-songwriter Carole King, released in May 1970. King already had a successful career as a songwriter and been a part of The City, a short-lived group she formed after moving to Los Angeles in 1968. Tracks on the album include "Up on the Roof", which was a number 4 hit for the Drifters in 1962, and "Child of Mine", which has been recorded by Billy Joe Royal, among others. The album did not receive much attention upon its release, though it entered the chart following the success of King's next album, Tapestry, in 1971. It was produced by John Fischbach, the co-founder of Crystal Sound studio, in Hollywood, California, where the album was recorded.

The album received positive reviews from critics, with AllMusic noting that it was the "most underrated of all [her] original albums". In a review that also covered Tapestry in Rolling Stone, Jon Landau wrote, "Writer was a blessing despite its faults" and that though the "production was poor", King herself made the album "very worthwhile".

== Track listing ==
All songs written by Gerry Goffin and Carole King; lyrics for "Raspberry Jam" and "What Have You Got to Lose" by Toni Stern.

Side one
No.	Title	Length
1.	"Spaceship Races"	3:09
2.	"No Easy Way Down"	4:36
3.	"Child of Mine"	4:05
4.	"Goin' Back"	3:20
5.	"To Love"	3:39
6.	"What Have You Got to Lose"	3:33

Side two
No.	Title	Length
1.	"Eventually"	5:01
2.	"Raspberry Jam"	4:35
3.	"Can't You Be Real"	3:00
4.	"I Can't Hear You No More"	2:46
5.	"Sweet Sweetheart"	2:46
6.	"Up on the Roof"	3:37

== Personnel ==
- Carole King – piano, vocals, backing vocals, arrangements
- Ralph Schuckett – organ
- John Fischbach – Moog synthesizer
- James Taylor – acoustic guitar; backing vocals on "Goin' Back"
- Danny Kortchmar – acoustic guitar, electric guitar, conga
- Charles Larkey – Fender bass
- Joel O'Brien – drums, percussion, vibes
- Abigale Haness, Delores Hall – backing vocals

Production

- John Fischbach – producer
- Andrew Berliner – engineer
- Gerry Goffin – mixing
- Guy Webster – cover photograph
- Tom Neuwirth – liner photographs
- Rod Dyer, Paul Bruhwiler – layout, design

== Charts ==
Chart (1971)	Position
Canadian RPM Albums Chart	62
Japanese Oricon Albums Chart	67
US Billboard Top LPs	84
