= Smackwater Jack =

Studio album by Quincy Jones
- Released: October 1971
- Recorded: 1971
- Studio: A & R Studios; Sound Ideas Studios
- Genre: Jazz; lounge
- Length: 42:48
- Label: A&M
- Producer: Phil Ramone

Quincy Jones chronology
$ (1971)	Smackwater Jack (1971)	The Hot Rock (1972)

Professional ratings
Review scores
Source	Rating
AllMusic	4.5/5 stars
The Penguin Guide to Jazz Recordings	2.5/4 stars

Smackwater Jack is a 1971 studio album by Quincy Jones. Tracks include the theme music to Ironside and The Bill Cosby Show.

== Track listing ==
1. "Smackwater Jack" (Gerry Goffin, Carole King) – 3:31
2. "Cast Your Fate to the Wind" (Vince Guaraldi) – 4:26
3. "Ironside" (Quincy Jones) – 3:53
4. "What's Going On" (Renaldo "Obie" Benson, Al Cleveland, Marvin Gaye) – 9:51
5. "Theme from The Anderson Tapes" (from The Anderson Tapes) (Jones) – 5:16
6. "Brown Ballad" (Ray Brown) – 4:20
7. "Hikky Burr" (Bill Cosby, Jones) – 4:02
8. "Guitar Blues Odyssey: From Roots to Fruits" (Jones) – 6:35

== Personnel ==
- Quincy Jones – arranger, conductor, vocals
- Joshie Armstead, Valerie Simpson, Bill Cosby, Marilyn Jackson – vocals
- Freddie Hubbard, Marvin Stamm – flugelhorn
- Buddy Childers, Snooky Young, Joe Newman, Ernie Royal – trumpet
- Wayne Andre, Garnett Brown – trombone
- Eric Gale, Arthur Adams, Freddie Robinson, Jim Hall, Joe Beck – guitar
- Toots Thielemans – guitar, harmonica, whistler
- Grady Tate – drums, percussion
- Paul Humphrey – drums
- Bob James, Joe Sample – keyboards
- Jaki Byard, Monty Alexander, Bobby Scott – piano
- Jimmy Smith – electronic organ
- Dick Hyman – piano, electric harpsichord
- Carol Kaye, Chuck Rainey – electric bass
- Ray Brown, Bob Cranshaw – double bass
- Hubert Laws – flute, saxophone
- Milt Jackson – vibraphone
- Pete Christlieb, Jerome Richardson – tenor saxophone
- Edd Kalehoff, Paul Beaver – Moog synthesizer

== Charts ==
Chart (1971)	Peak position
US Billboard 200	56
US Top R&B/Hip-Hop Albums (Billboard)	11
