= Colour of Your Dreams =

Studio album by Carole King
- Released: March 16, 1993
- Recorded: 1992
- Studios: Rude Stude Recording (Studio City, California); Mad Hatter Studios (Los Angeles, California); Skyline Studios (New York City, New York)
- Genres: Pop; rock
- Length: 47:21
- Label: Rhythm Safari/Priority/EMI
- Producers: Rudy Guess; Carole King

Carole King chronology
City Streets (1989)	Colour of Your Dreams (1993)	In Concert (1994)

Professional ratings
Review scores
Source	Rating
AllMusic	2/5 stars
Rolling Stone	4/5 stars

Colour of Your Dreams is the fifteenth studio album by singer-songwriter Carole King, released in March 1993. The album includes "Now and Forever", a Grammy-nominated song which was featured in the film A League of Their Own.

== Track listing ==
All song written and composed by Carole King, except where indicated

1. "Lay Down My Life" – 5:14
2. "Hold Out for Love" – 4:51
3. "Standing in the Rain" (Gerry Goffin, King) – 4:04
4. "Now and Forever" – 3:13
5. "Wishful Thinking" – 3:17
6. "Colour of Your Dreams" – 3:02
7. "Tears Falling Down on Me" – 4:57
8. "Friday's Tie-Dye Nightmare" – 4:34
9. "Just One Thing" – 5:04
10. "Do You Feel Love" – 5:24
11. "It's Never Too Late" (Goffin, King) – 3:41

=== Bonus tracks on 1993 Japanese edition ===
1. "Te Daria La Vida (Amor)" [Spanish Version of "Lay Down My Life"] (King, Cecilia Noël) – 3:50
2. "Lay Down My Life" [Radio Edit] – 3:47

== Personnel ==
Musicians

- Carole King – vocals, acoustic piano (1, 3–6, 9, 11), acoustic piano solo (1), organ (1, 10), keyboards (2), acoustic guitar (6, 7), synthesizers (10)
- Teddy Andreadis – keyboards (2), organ (3, 11), organ solo (10)
- Robbie Kondor – synthesizers (4)
- Rudy Guess – guitars (2–4, 9, 10), acoustic guitar (5–8)
- Slash – lead guitar (2)
- J.J. Holiday – acoustic slide guitar (8)
- John Humphrey – bass, bass solo (10)
- Danny Carey – drums (1, 10, 11), Yamaha RY-30 (1)
- Jerry Angel – drums (2–4, 7, 9)
- Chris Frazier – drums (8)
- Lynn Coulter – percussion (2), drums (6)
- Danny Pelfrey – alto saxophone (5), sax solo (10)
- Jim Avery – French horn (9)

Background vocalists

- Carole King – backing vocals (2, 3, 6, 10)
- Leata Galloway – backing vocals (2)
- Linda Lawley – backing vocals (2)
- Danny Pelfrey – backing vocals (2)

Production

- Carole King – producer, mixing (1–3, 5–10)
- Rudy Guess – producer, mixing (1–3, 5–10), recording (1–3, 5, 7, 9, 10)
- Evren Göknar – recording (1, 2, 6, 8–10)
- Larry Mah – recording (4)
- Malcolm Pollack – mixing (4)
- John Bennett – recording (9)
- Bernie Grundman – mastering at Bernie Grundman Mastering (Hollywood, California)
- Kosh – art direction, design
- Robert Blakeman – photography

== Charts ==
Chart performance for Colour of Your Dreams
Chart (1993)	Peak position
Australian Albums (ARIA)	72
