= Louise Goffin =

American musician

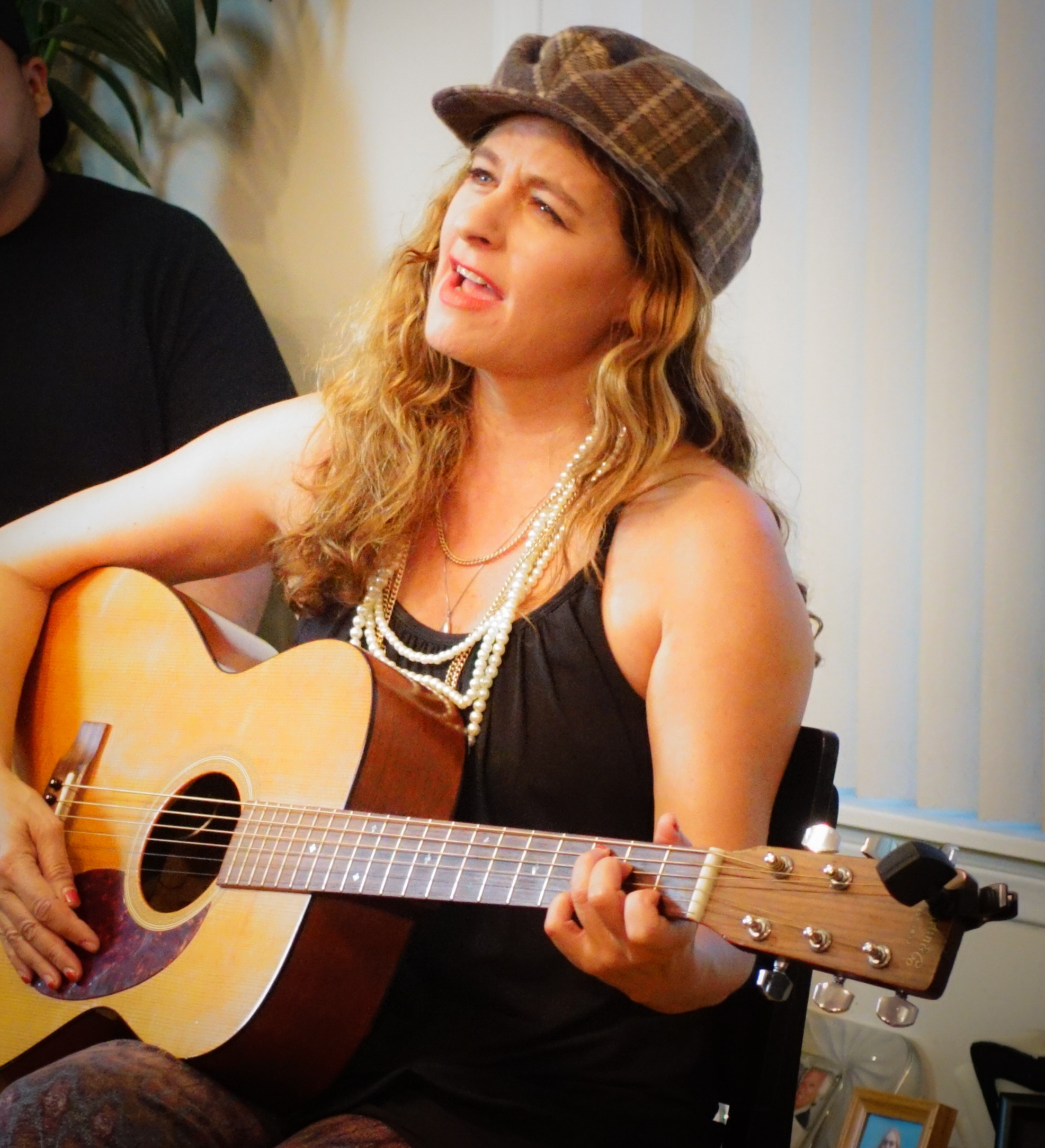
- Goffin in 2014

Background information
- Born: March 23, 1960 (age 66); Brooklyn, New York, U.S.
- Genres: Pop; rock
- Occupations: Singer-songwriter; producer
- Years active: 1974–present
- Website: louisegoffin.com

Louise Goffin (born March 23, 1960) is an American singer-songwriter and producer of the 2011 album A Holiday Carole. Signed by record executive Lenny Waronker to DreamWorks in 1999, Goffin released Sometimes a Circle in 2002. She went on to release five albums, an EP, and several singles independently through her own label Majority of One Records, which was launched May 2008. She teaches songwriting to teen girls from disadvantaged backgrounds in partnership with the charitable organization WriteGirl.

== Early life ==
Goffin's parents are songwriters Carole King and Gerry Goffin. At the age of 14 she and her sister, Sherry, provided vocals for the song "Nightingale", on her mother Carole King's album Wrap Around Joy, which was released in 1974. She also sang backing vocals on Carole King's 1975 release Really Rosie and her 1977 release Simple Things. At Los Angeles' University High School's Interdisciplinary Program School (1975), she used the name Lakshme.

== Career as recording artist ==
Goffin's debut public performance was opening for Jackson Browne at the Troubadour when she was 17 years old. Her debut album Kid Blue, produced by Danny Kortchmar, was released on Elektra Records in 1979.

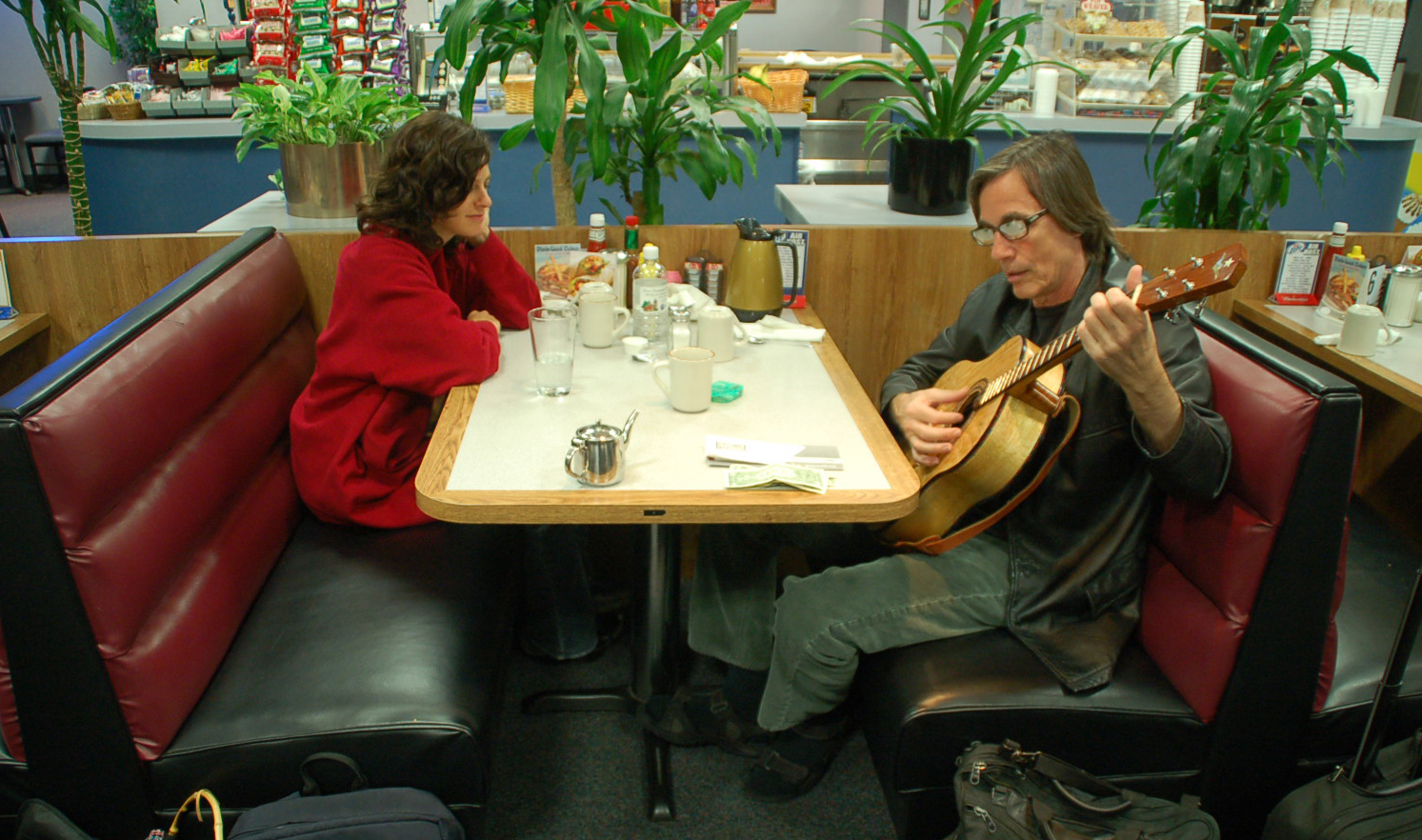
Louise Goffin and Jackson Browne, Green Bay Airport, June 2008

Goffin was the youngest artist on the soundtrack to Fast Times at Ridgemont High. She lived in England in 1984–1994 and made two records while signed to WEA. This Is the Place, released in 1988, included the VH1 video hit "Bridge of Sighs". The following UK album was recorded 1990–1 at Astoria Studios, a houseboat, built in 1911 for and once owned by impresario Fred Karno, now a recording studio owned by David Gilmour of Pink Floyd. The rare UK Eastwest Records recordings include a version of the U2 song "Sweetest Thing", with additional lyrics by Bono.

In 2002 Goffin released the album Sometimes a Circle, produced by Greg Wells through the DreamWorks label.

In 2008, Goffin launched her own label Majority Of One Records to put out her first independent release, the eight-song Bad Little Animals. She has continued to release her recordings through Majority Of One, including Songs From The Mine, which features backing vocals from Alice Cooper and Johnny Depp on "Watching The Sky Turn Blue"; Appleonfire, a tribute EP to her late father; The Essential Louise Goffin, Vol. 1, combining highlights from her previous three records with new recordings; and many singles. Her album All These Hellos, co-produced with Dave Way and featuring performances by Chris Difford from Squeeze, Rufus Wainwright, Van Dyke Parks and Billy Harvey, was released in fall 2018. Her subsequent album Two Different Movies, released in 2020, was also co-produced by Dave Way and featured contributions from Billy Harvey, Van Dyke Parks, Benmont Tench, and Greg Leisz. The album cover art is a sketch of Louise drawn by Joni Mitchell.

Goffin sang on the theme song for the TV show Gilmore Girls, dueting with her mother on King's song "Where You Lead". Goffin didn't realize how popular the show was until many years later, but embraced its impact and appeared at the Gilmore Girls Fan Fest.

== Other work ==
Goffin produced Carole King's first holiday record A Holiday Carole. Goffin co-wrote all three original songs "New Year's Day", "Christmas Paradise", and "Christmas In The Air". There is a jazz arrangement of a classic Chanukah prayer, co-arranged with musician and horn player Lee Curreri. The album was nominated for a Grammy.

Goffin has played with other known musicians as a side-woman. She appeared playing banjo with Bryan Ferry in his video "I Put a Spell on You". She went on to play guitar on tour with Tears for Fears in 1997.

Goffin leads songwriting masterclasses and mentors teen girls in songwriting in partnership with the organization WriteGirl.

In 2018, she and co-host Paul Zollo launched the podcast The Great Song Adventure, where they interview notable songwriters and other music industry influencers.

In 2020, Goffin launched her own songwriter interview podcast called Song Chronicles.

Goffin is the creative director of The Goffin & King Foundation, which seeks to preserve her parents' legacy through empowering rising songwriters with educational opportunities.

== Discography ==
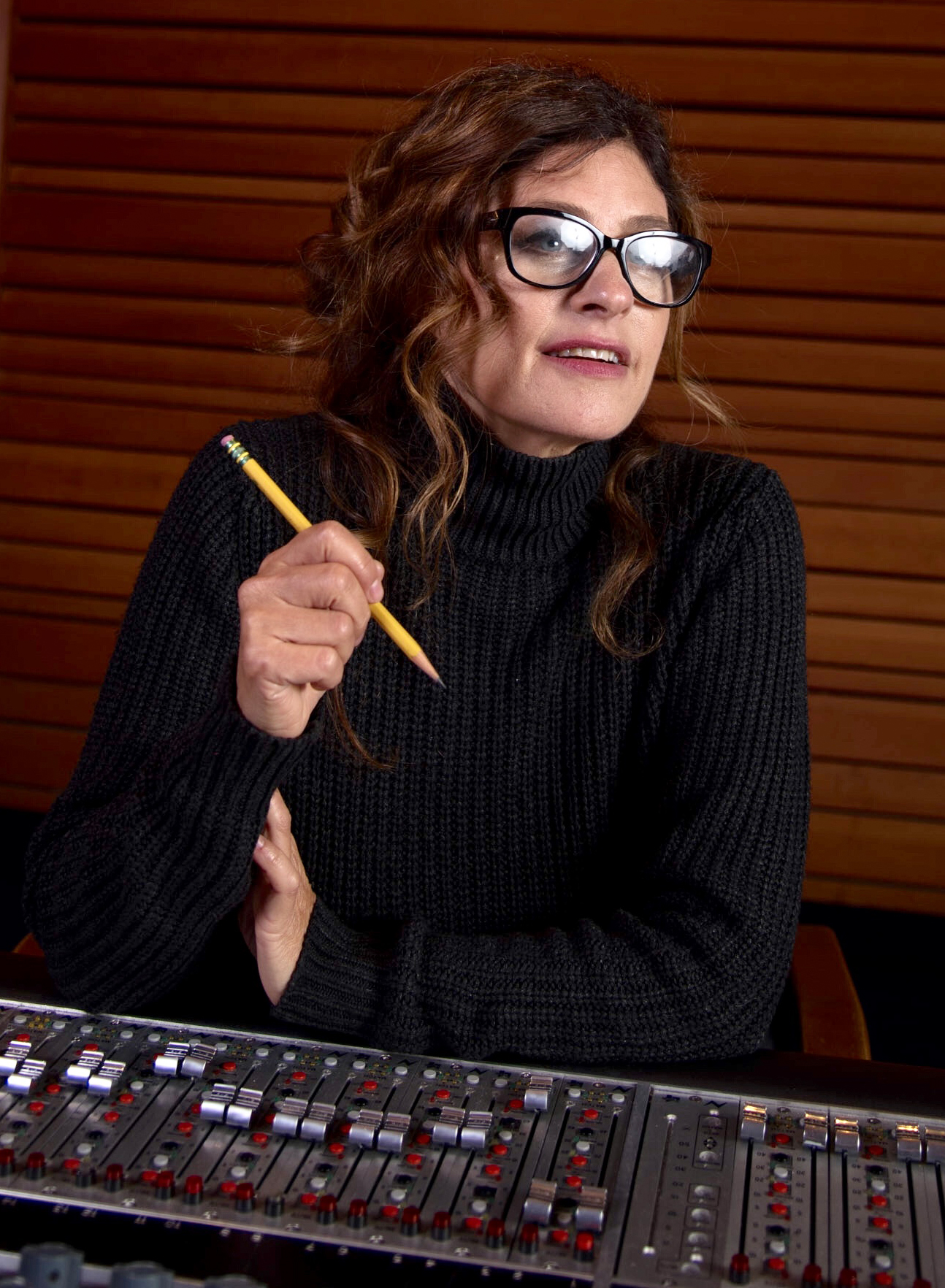
Goffin at Village Recording Studios in 2016

=== Albums ===
As solo artist

- Kid Blue – 1979 – (Elektra/Asylum) – Artist/Songwriter
- Louise Goffin – 1981 – (Elektra/Asylum) – Artist/Songwriter
- This Is The Place – 1988 – (Warner Bros.) – Artist/Songwriter
- Sometimes A Circle – 2002 – (DreamWorks) – Artist/Songwriter
- Bad Little Animals – 2009 – (Majority Of One) – Artist/Co-writer/ Producer
- Songs From The Mine – 2014 – (Majority Of One) – Artist/Co-Writer/Co-Producer
- Appleonfire – 2015 – (Majority Of One) – Artist/Co-Writer/Co-Producer
- The Essential Louise Goffin, Volume 1 – 2016 – (Majority Of One)
- All These Hellos – 2018 – (Majority Of One)
- Two Different Movies – 2020 – (Majority Of One)

Other

- Carole King : A Holiday Carole – 2011 – (Concord) Co-writer/ Producer

=== Singles ===
- (You Make Me Feel Like) A Natural Woman – 2016 – (Pink2Black)
- Fifth of July – 2017 – (Majority Of One)
- Revenge (ft. Skylar Gudasz) / Bird of Paradise – 2017 – (Majority Of One)
- Let Me in Again / A Fine Surprise – 2017 – (Majority Of One)
- New Year's Day (ft. Billy Valentine) – 2017 – (Majority Of One)
- Good Times Call – 2018 – (Majority Of One)
- All These Hellos (ft. Billy Harvey) – 2018 – (Majority Of One)
- Is It Too Late to Hold on Tight – 2018 – (Majority Of One)
- My Love Supreme – 2019 – (Majority Of One)
- Safe Place To Land – 2020 – (Majority Of One)
- Every Love Song – 2020 – (Majority Of One)
- Oh My God (ft. Van Dyke Parks) – 2020 – (Majority Of One)
- Ain't No Rest for the Wicked – 2020 – (Majority Of One)
- The Mistress of Killer Riley James – 2021 – (Majority Of One)
