= Toni Stern =

American musician (1944–2024)

Toni Stern (November 4, 1944 – January 17, 2024) was an American musician who, most notably, collaborated with Carole King. Stern wrote the lyrics for several songs of King's in the 1960s and early 1970s, including "It's Too Late". In 2017, Stern published As Close as I Can, a book of her poetry.

Stern died on January 17, 2024, at the age of 79.
