= Beautiful (Carole King song) =

- Scandinavian single with "You've Got a Friend" on the A-side

Song by Carole King

from the album Tapestry
- Released: February 10, 1971
- Studio: A&M (Hollywood, California)
- Genre: Pop
- Length: 3:08
- Label: Ode; A&M
- Songwriter: Carole King
- Producer: Lou Adler

"Beautiful" is a song written by Carole King that was first released on her 1971 award-winning album Tapestry. It has also been covered by other artists, such as Barbra Streisand and Richard Marx, and included on several of King's live albums. It was also used as the title song of the 2014 Broadway musical Beautiful: The Carole King Musical.

== Lyrics and music ==
According to Carole King, she did not consciously attempt to write "Beautiful" but it came to her spontaneously. It stemmed from her realization while riding the New York City Subway that the way she perceived others reflected how she herself felt. She has also stated that because it came to her spontaneously, she initially didn't realize some of the professional details of the song, such as the lack of rhyme in the refrain, which if she was writing the song consciously she would have included.

Rolling Stone Magazine critic Jon Landau describes "Beautiful" as an "uptempo song." The lyrics reflect themes present throughout the Tapestry album, such as the importance of self-esteem and positive outlook. Within the song, beauty is defined not as an attractive outward appearance but as inner beauty. In the verses of the song, the singer sings about the unhappy people she sees around her. The message is emphasized by setting the verses in a minor key and to a straightforward rhythm and singing at a relatively low pitch. The refrain, describes the need for optimism and self-esteem to be successful, and is reinforced by being set in a major key and to a syncopated rhythm and at a higher pitch.

Instrumentation for "Beautiful" includes King playing piano and synthesizer, Charles Larkey on bass guitar, Joel O'Brien on drums and Danny Kortchmar on conga drums. Author James Perone praises the song as "great sleeper track" but criticizes the use of the synthesizer, which although not prominent he believes sounds synthetic, detracting from the song's emphasis on being real. Rolling Stone Album Guide critic Mark Coleman states that King's performance "rescues 'Beautiful' from the sentimental deep end."

== Personnel ==
- Carole King – piano, synthesizer, vocals

=== Additional musicians ===
- Danny "Kootch" Kortchmar – electric guitar, congas
- Charles "Charlie" Larkey – bass guitar
- Joel O'Brien – drums

== Other releases ==
A live version of "Beautiful" was included on King's 1994 album In Concert. Another live version, recorded on June 18, 1971, at Carnegie Hall, was released on King's 1996 album Carnegie Hall Concert: June 18, 1971. Another live version was included on the 2007 album Welcome to My Living Room. The studio version was also included on the 2007 compilation album The Best of Carole King.

Barbra Streisand covered "Beautiful" as the opening track of her 1971 album Barbra Joan Streisand. Anne Murray recorded "Beautiful" for her 1972 album release Annie. Richard Marx covered "Beautiful" on the 1995 tribute album Tapestry Revisited: A Tribute to Carole King. AllMusic critic William Ruhlmann described Marx's version as one of the best covers on the album. "Beautiful" has also been covered by Julie Conant and by The Overtures. The song was also covered by Jonathan Rayson on his 2006 album Shiny and New.

"Beautiful" is part of the cast recording for the 2014 Broadway musical Beautiful: The Carole King Musical. It is sung in Act 2 by the actress portraying Carole King. On its opening night on Broadway, it was sung by Jessie Mueller. The song is also included on the Broadway cast album of the musical.
