= Smackwater Jack (song) =

Single by Carole King

from the album Tapestry
- A-side: "So Far Away"
- Released: March 1971
- Recorded: January 1971 at A&M Recording Studios
- Genre: Pop; R&B
- Length: 3:39
- Label: Ode; A&M; Sony/BMG
- Songwriter(s): Gerry Goffin, Carole King
- Producer(s): Lou Adler

Carole King singles chronology
"It's Too Late" / "I Feel the Earth Move" (1971)	"So Far Away" / "Smackwater Jack" (1971)	"Sweet Seasons" (1971)

Official audio
- "Smackwater Jack" on YouTube

"Smackwater Jack" is a song written by Gerry Goffin and Carole King. It was first released on King's 1971 album Tapestry and then on the second single from that album, along with "So Far Away", charting at number 14 on the Billboard Hot 100. It was subsequently covered by many artists, most famously by Quincy Jones as the title song of his 1971 album Smackwater Jack.

Rolling Stone critic Jon Landau described "Smackwater Jack" as an "uptempo shuffle". Its lyrics tell the story of a confrontation between the outlaw Smackwater Jack and Big Jim the Chief. In this way it differs from the other songs on Tapestry, which are more personal and based on expressing emotions.

Billboard ranked both sides of the "So Far Away"/"Smackwater Jack" single together on the Billboard Hot 100. The single peaked at number 14.

== Critical reception ==
Author James Perone claims that the song still fits into the album by being the one song on which Carole King's piano blends in with the other instruments on the song. Perone regards Danny Kortchmar's electric guitar and Ralph Schuckett's electric piano as the most prominent instruments on the song, but Landau showers most praise on Charlie Larkey's bass guitar and Joel O'Brien's drums.

Landau regards "Smackwater Jack" as a good example of the effectiveness of Goffin's and King's songwriting partnership. He regards Goffin as providing "brilliant and far-ranging" lyrics, while King "is subtly embellishing the musical form itself". AllMusic critic Stewart Mason agrees that the song has "dry wit and several clever lines". Mason described the song as a "fan-favorite", but also regards it as a "rather lightweight song".

== Personnel ==
- Carole King – piano, vocals

Additional musicians

- Curtis Amy – baritone saxophone
- Merry Clayton – background vocals
- Danny "Kootch" Kortchmar – electric guitar
- Charles "Charlie" Larkey – bass guitar
- Joel O'Brien – drums
- Ralph Schuckett – electric piano

== Cover versions ==
Quincy Jones covered "Smackwater Jack" as the title track of his 1971 album Smackwater Jack. AllMusic critic Thom Jurek described it as being in a "taut, funky soul style. Jurek described Grady Tate's drum breaks as "funky", Arthur Adams' guitar playing as "tough street guitar" and Chuck Rainey's bass guitar as "popping and bubbling under the entire mix".

The Manhattan Transfer covered "Smackwater Jack" for the 1995 album Tapestry Revisited: A Tribute to Carole King. Buffy Sainte-Marie covered it on her 1971 album She Used to Wanna Be a Ballerina, on which she was accompanied only by her own piano playing.
