= So Far Away (Carole King song) =

Single by Carole King

from the album Tapestry
- B-side: "Smackwater Jack"
- Released: August 1971
- Recorded: January 1971
- Studio: A&M, Hollywood
- Genre: Soft rock; pop
- Length: 3:55
- Label: Ode/A&M Records; Epic/SME Records
- Songwriter: Carole King
- Producer: Lou Adler

Carole King singles chronology
"It's Too Late" / "I Feel the Earth Move" (1971)	"So Far Away" / "Smackwater Jack" (1971)	"Sweet Seasons" (1971)

"So Far Away" is a song written by Carole King, which appeared on her 1971 album Tapestry. The recording features James Taylor on acoustic guitar. In addition to Taylor, and King on piano, instruments include Russ Kunkel on drums, Charles Larkey on bass guitar and Curtis Amy on flute.

The lyrics express longing for a lover who is far away. AllMusic critic Bill Janovitz notes that while the lyrics start by focusing on the physical distance between the lovers, the lyrics use that as a jumping-off point to explore emotional distance between lovers as well. Rolling Stone stated King's "warm, earnest singing" on the song brought out the song's sadness. Cash Box said of it that "Carole weaves a magnificent ballad spun of soft, melodic phrasing and soothing piano accompaniment topped off with the superb Lou Adler production touch." Record World called it a "finely crafted cut". In 2017, Paste ranked the song number four on their list of the 12 greatest Carole King songs, and in 2022, American Songwriter ranked the song number two on their list of the 10 greatest Carole King songs. It was performed at Amy Winehouse's funeral by friends and family as it was one of Winehouse's favorite songs. In 2024 Ultimate Classic Rock critic Michael Gallucci rated it as the 29th greatest soft rock song, saying that it incorporates "one of [King's] most beautiful melodies."

== Personnel ==
- Carole King – piano, vocals
- Curtis Amy – flute
- Russ Kunkel – drums
- Charles "Charlie" Larkey – bass guitar
- James Taylor – acoustic guitar

== Covers ==
In 1995, Rod Stewart's cover of the song was included on the tribute album Tapestry Revisited: A Tribute to Carole King. In the US, it was released as a single and peaked at #2 on the Adult Contemporary chart. It reached #4 on the Canadian AC chart. "So Far Away" was later included on his 1996 ballad compilation album If We Fall in Love Tonight.

== In popular culture ==
The song was featured in Sofia Coppola's 1999 film The Virgin Suicides.

== Chart history ==
=== Weekly charts ===
Carole King original

Chart (1971)	Peak position
Canada RPM 100 Singles	17
Canada RPM Adult Contemporary	12
U.S. Adult Contemporary (Billboard)	3
U.S. Billboard Hot 100	14
US Cashbox Hot 100	13
U.S. Record World Singles Chart	5

Rod Stewart cover

Chart (1996)	Peak position
Canada RPM Adult Contemporary	4
Germany	74
U.S. Adult Contemporary	2
US Radio Songs (Billboard)	71

=== Year-end charts ===
Chart (1971)	Rank
U.S. Adult Contemporary (Billboard)	31
U.S. (Joel Whitburn's Pop Annual)	118

== Certifications ==
Carole King original

Region	Certification	Certified units/sales
United States (RIAA)	Gold	500,000^{‡}
^{‡} Sales+streaming figures based on certification alone.
