= It's Too Late (Carole King song) =

1971 song by Carole King

- US vinyl single; picture is also used for the "I Feel the Earth Move" side and the parent album Tapestry

Single by Carole King

from the album Tapestry
- A-side: "I Feel the Earth Move"
- Released: April 16, 1971
- Studio: A&M (Hollywood, California)
- Genre: Pop; soft rock; jazz
- Length: 3:51
- Label: Ode
- Composer: Carole King
- Lyricist: Toni Stern
- Producer: Lou Adler

Carole King singles chronology
"Up on the Roof" (1970)	"It's Too Late" / "I Feel the Earth Move" (1971)	"So Far Away" / "Smackwater Jack" (1971)

Official audio
- "It's Too Late" on YouTube

"It's Too Late" is a song from Carole King's second studio album, Tapestry (1971). Toni Stern wrote the lyrics and King wrote the music. It was released as a single in April 1971 by Ode Records and reached No. 1 on the US Billboard Hot 100 and Adult Contemporary charts. Sales were later platinum-certified by the Recording Industry Association of America (RIAA). Billboard ranked "It's Too Late" and its fellow A-side, "I Feel the Earth Move", as the No. 3 record for 1971.

== Music and lyrics ==
The lyrics describe the blameless end of a loving relationship. Music critic Dave Marsh saw implicit feminism because the woman leaves the man. Marsh also remarked on the maturity of the theme. Music critic Robert Christgau wrote that "if there's a truer song about breaking up than 'It's Too Late,' the world (or at least AM radio) isn't ready for it." Marsh described the melody as Tin Pan Alley and the arrangement as a cross between light jazz and "L.A. studio craftsmanship." Rolling Stone remarked that Carole King's "warm, earnest singing" on the song brought out the song's sadness. According to author James Perone, the feel of the song is enhanced by the instrumental work of Danny Kortchmar on guitar, Curtis Amy on saxophone and King on piano. Kortchmar and Amy each have an instrumental solo. Cash Box described the song as "a sensitive ballad with a strong rock under-beat." Record World said that it is "quality contemporary pop."

Lyricist Toni Stern told author Sheila Weller that she wrote the lyrics in a single day, after her relationship with James Taylor ended. (This runs counter to multiple obituaries, including one by her husband of many years until her death, Jerry Rounds.) The recording won a Grammy Award for Record of the Year at the 14th Annual Grammy Awards in 1972, and the song is included in Rolling Stone's 500 Greatest Songs of All Time. In 2003 the song was inducted into the Grammy Hall of Fame.

== Personnel ==
- Carole King – piano, vocals
- Curtis Amy – soprano saxophone
- Danny "Kootch" Kortchmar – congas, electric guitar
- Charles "Charlie" Larkey – bass guitar
- Joel O'Brien – drums
- Ralph Schuckett – electric piano

== Soundtracks ==
"It's Too Late" has been featured in Hollywood films, including Fandango (1985), The Lake House (2006), and Invincible (2006). It was also featured in "Jagged Little Tapestry", a sixth season episode of the television series Glee in 2015, where it was performed by Kurt Hummel (Chris Colfer) and Blaine Anderson (Darren Criss).

== Awards and recognition ==
- King's version of "It's Too Late" peaked at No. 1 on the Billboard Hot 100 and Adult Contemporary charts. It was on the Hot 100 as a double A-side with "I Feel the Earth Move".
- King's version of "It's Too Late" was gold-certified by the RIAA.
- "It's Too Late" won a Grammy Award for Record of the Year in 1972.
- "It's Too Late" is ranked No. 469 on Rolling Stone's list of the 500 greatest songs of all time. It was dropped in the 2010 version but updated to No. 310 in the 2021 version.
- Together with its other A-side, it was named by the RIAA as No. 213 of 365 Songs of the Century.

== Charts ==
=== Weekly charts ===
Carole King

Chart (1971)	Peak position
Australia	6
Canada Top Singles (RPM)	1
Canada Adult Contemporary (RPM)	2
Ireland	8
New Zealand (Listener)	6
UK	6
US Billboard Hot 100	1
US Hot Adult Contemporary Tracks (Billboard)	1
US Cash Box Top 100	1

Bill Deal & the Rhondels

Chart (1972)	Peak position
US Bubbling Under the Hot 100 (Billboard)	108

=== Year-end charts ===
Chart (1971)	Rank
Australia	33
Canada Top Singles (RPM)	5
US Billboard Hot 100	3
US Cash Box Top 100	2

== Certifications ==
Region	Certification	Certified units/sales
United Kingdom (BPI)	Gold	400,000^{‡}
United States (RIAA)	Platinum	1,000,000^{‡}
^{‡} Sales+streaming figures based on certification alone.

== Quartz version ==
"It's Too Late"

Single by Quartz introducing Dina Carroll

from the album Perfect Timing
- Released: 1991
- Genre: Dance
- Length: 9:37 (Overnight Mix); 6:46 (Overnight Dub)
- Label: Mercury
- Songwriters: Carole King; Toni Stern
- Producer: Quartz

Quartz introducing Dina Carroll singles chronology
"Let's Get Busy (Pump It Up)" (1990)	"It's Too Late" (1991)	"Naked Love (Just Say You Want Me)" (1991)

Dina Carroll singles chronology
"It's Too Late" (1991)	"Ain't No Man" (1992)

Music video
- "It's Too Late" on YouTube

British dance music production duo Quartz (Ronnie Herel and Dave Rawlings) released their version of "It's Too Late" in 1991 on their album Perfect Timing, introducing British singer-songwriter Dina Carroll. The single, released by Mercury Records, earned Carroll her first hit, reaching number eight on the UK Singles Chart and on the Music Week Dance Singles chart. It was also a top-5 hit in Israel and Luxembourg and a top-30 hit in Austria, peaking at number 21.

=== Critical reception ===
James Hamilton from Music Week described the cover as a "gentle Carole King revival" in his weekly Dance column. Anthony James from NME wrote, "'It's Too Late' should see a reversal in their fortunes. Featuring the gutsy vocals of Dina Carroll it's a truly kickin' track but with a commercial edge. Carole King will turn in her rave." Another NME editor, Ian McCann, complimented it as "a genuine hit".

=== Track listing ===
- 7", UK (1991)

A. "It's Too Late"
B. "Obsession"

- 12", UK (1991)

A. "It's Too Late" (Overnight Mix)
B1. "It's Too Late" (Overnight Dub)
B2. "Obsession"

- CD single, UK & Europe (1991)
1. "It's Too Late" (Overnight Mix) – 9:37
2. "It's Too Late" (Overnight Dub) – 6:46
3. "Obsession" 3:17
- Cassette, UK (1991)

A1. "It's Too Late"
A2. "Obsession"
B1. "It's Too Late"
B2. "Obsession"

=== Charts ===
==== Weekly charts ====
Chart (1991)	Peak position
Austria (Ö3 Austria Top 40)	21
Europe (Eurochart Hot 100)	17
Israel (Israeli Singles Chart)	5
Luxembourg (Radio Luxembourg)	2
UK Singles (OCC)	8
UK Airplay (Music Week)	4
UK Dance (Music Week)	8
UK Club Chart (Record Mirror)	6

==== Year-end charts ====
Chart (1991)	Position
UK Singles (OCC)	57
UK Club Chart (Record Mirror)	53

== Gloria Estefan version ==
"It's Too Late"

Single by Gloria Estefan

from the album Hold Me, Thrill Me, Kiss Me
- Released: May 9, 1995
- Recorded: 1993–1994
- Genre: Pop
- Length: 3:57
- Label: Epic
- Songwriters: Carole King; Toni Stern
- Producers: Emilio Estefan, Jr.; Jorge Casas; Clay Ostwald

Gloria Estefan singles chronology
"Everlasting Love" (1995)	"It's Too Late" (1995)	"Cherchez La Femme" (1995)

Music video
- "It's Too Late" on YouTube

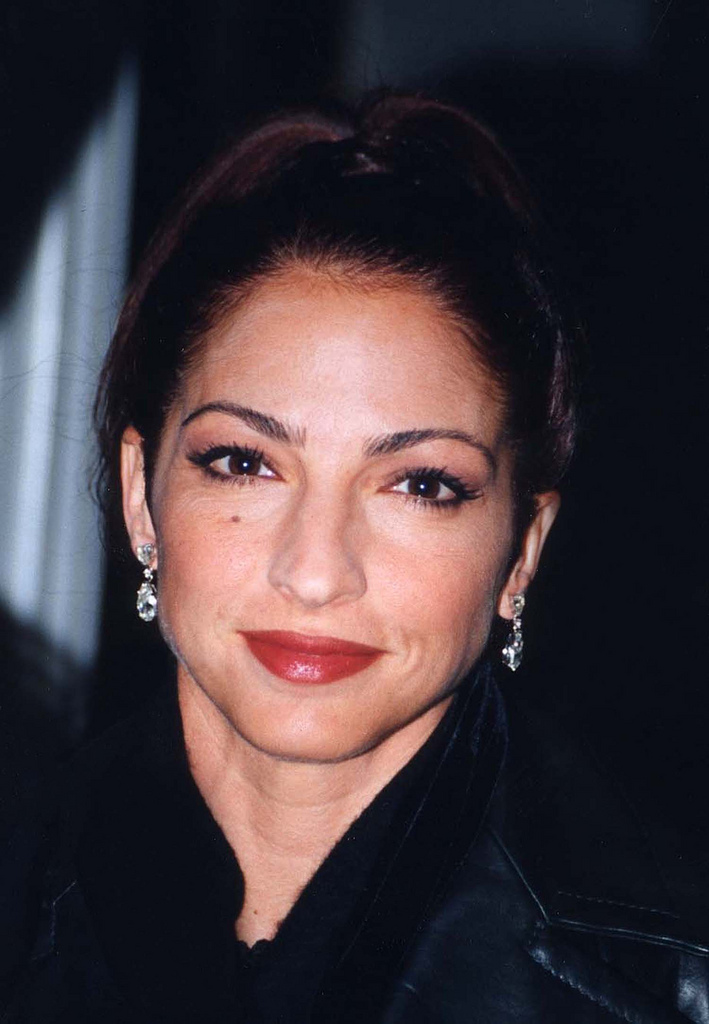
Gloria Estefan, 2001

Cuban American singer and songwriter Gloria Estefan released her cover of "It's Too Late" in 1995 as the third promotional single (in the US), and fourth overall single released from her fourth studio album, Hold Me, Thrill Me, Kiss Me (1994). It was produced by Emilio Estefan, Jr., Jorge Casas and Clay Ostwald, and released in May 1995 by Epic Records.

=== Critical reception ===
AllMusic editor Eddie Huffman described Estefan's version as "[a] moment of genuine pathos" in his review of the Hold Me, Thrill Me, Kiss Me album. Steve Baltin from Cash Box magazine felt the singer "does a decent job with the vocals, but this is one of those songs that everybody feels they own. As such, it’s better off being left alone." Chuck Campbell from Knoxville News Sentinel viewed it as a "faithful" remake of Carole King's 1971 hit, "though Tim Mitchell's intrusive electric-guitar solo is an unwelcome addition." Phil Shanklin of ReviewsRevues remarked that King's voice does possess the same warmth as Estefan's. Tony Cross from Smash Hits gave Estefan's version two out of five, writing that "Glo's done a fine job tweeking it into shape by funking it up a bit."

=== Official versions ===
1. Album version – 3:57
2. Piano mix – 3:38
3. Radio mix – 3:19

=== Release history ===
Region	Date
US	May 9, 1995
Europe	June 12, 1995

=== Charts ===
==== Weekly charts ====
Chart (1995)	Peak position
Australia (ARIA)	124
UK Airplay (Music Week)	45
US Hot Adult Contemporary Tracks (Billboard)	31
US AC Top 30 (R&R)	13

==== Year-end charts ====
Chart (1995)	Position
US AC Top 30 (R&R)	46

=== Formats and track listings ===
US promo CD single (ESK 77877)
No.	Title	Writer(s)	Length
1.	"It's Too Late" (Radio Mix)	Carole King, Toni Stern	3:19
2.	"It's Too Late" (Album Version)	Carole King, Toni Stern	3:57
3.	"It's Too Late" (Piano Mix)	Carole King, Toni Stern	3:58

Europe CD single (EPC 662040 1)
No.	Title	Writer(s)	Length
1.	"It's Too Late" (Radio Mix)	Carole King, Toni Stern	3:19
2.	"It's Too Late" (Piano Mix)	Carole King, Toni Stern	3:58

UK CD-maxi single (662044 2) [Cancelled / Unreleased]
No.	Title	Writer(s)	Length
1.	"It's Too Late" (Radio Mix)	Carole King, Toni Stern	3:19
2.	"It's Too Late" (Piano Mix)	Carole King, Toni Stern	3:58
3.	"Cherchez La Femme" (Radio Club Mix)	August Darnell, Stony Browder, Jr.	3:54
4.	"Cherchez La Femme" (Album Version)	August Darnell, Stony Browder, Jr.	4:58

UK promo CD single (XPCD 652)
No.	Title	Writer(s)	Length
1.	"It's Too Late" (Radio Mix)	Carole King, Toni Stern	3:19

Mexico promo CD single #1 (PRCD 96384)
No.	Title	Writer(s)	Length
1.	"It's Too Late" (Album Version)	Carole King, Toni Stern	3:57
2.	"Cherchez La Femme" (Album Version)	August Darnell, Stony Browder, Jr.	4:58

Mexico promo CD single #2 (PRCD 96605)
No.	Title	Writer(s)	Length
1.	"It's Too Late" (Radio Mix)	Carole King, Toni Stern	3:19

Australia CD-maxi single (662020 2)
No.	Title	Writer(s)	Length
1.	"It's Too Late" (Radio Mix)	Carole King, Toni Stern	3:19
2.	"It's Too Late" (Album Version)	Carole King, Toni Stern	3:57
3.	"It's Too Late" (Piano Mix)	Carole King, Toni Stern	3:58
4.	"Cherchez La Femme" (Doom Dub)	August Darnell, Stony Browder, Jr.	8:17
5.	"Cherchez La Femme" (Piano Mix)	August Darnell, Stony Browder, Jr.	6:41

== Other notable versions ==
The song has been covered by

- 1972: The Isley Brothers on their album Brother, Brother, Brother; reaching No. 39 on the R&B chart.
- 1972: The Stylistics on their album Round 2.
- 1973: Mike James Kirkland on the album Doin' it Right.
- 1981: John Paul Young covered the song on the album The Singer.
- 1989: David Lasley on his album Soldiers on the Moon.
- 2022: Lucy Dacus along with a cover of another Tapestry track "Home Again".
