= Her Greatest Hits: Songs of Long Ago =

Greatest hits album by Carole King
- Released: March 1978; May 25, 1999 (re-release)
- Recorded: 1971–1978
- Genre: Pop
- Label: Ode/Epic/CBS
- Producer: Lou Adler

Carole King chronology
| Welcome Home (1978) | Her Greatest Hits: Songs of Long Ago (1978) | Touch the Sky (1979) |

Professional ratings
Review scores
| Source | Rating |
|---|---|
| Allmusic | 4.5/5 stars |
| Christgau's Record Guide | B+ |

Her Greatest Hits: Songs of Long Ago is the first official compilation album by Carole King. It was released in 1978 and features twelve songs that had previously appeared on her six studio albums for Ode Records released between 1971 and 1976. The album was re-released on CD/Cassette in 1999 with two additional tracks.

== Background ==
Her Greatest Hits: Songs of Long Ago is Carole King's first compilation album. The original release features twelve songs which had previously appeared on her studio albums Tapestry, Music, Rhymes and Reasons, Fantasy, Wrap Around Joy and Thoroughbred. Four of the songs had appeared on her second album Tapestry, one of the most successful albums in the history of popular music. "Brother, Brother", a song of her third album Music, is the only one chosen for the compilation LP that was never released as a single. The original release does not feature any songs from her debut album Writer or from her two most recent albums at the time of the initial release, Simple Things and Welcome Home.

The 1999 re-release of the album was digitally remastered and included the live versions of two more songs as performed during her Carnegie Hall concert in 1971: "Eventually," from her debut album Writer, and "(You Make Me Feel Like) A Natural Woman," which was originally recorded by Aretha Franklin in 1967 and was covered by King for Tapestry.

== Track listing ==
All tracks written by Carole King, except where noted.

=== 1978 release ===
Side one
| No. | Title | Writer(s) | Length |
|---|---|---|---|
| 1. | "Jazzman" | King, David Palmer | 3:48 |
| 2. | "So Far Away" | | 3:58 |
| 3. | "Sweet Seasons" | King, Toni Stern | 3:17 |
| 4. | "Brother, Brother" | | 3:02 |
| 5. | "Only Love Is Real" | | 3:35 |
| 6. | "I Feel the Earth Move" | | 3:02 |

Side two
| No. | Title | Writer(s) | Length |
|---|---|---|---|
| 7. | "It's Too Late" | King, Stern | 3:55 |
| 8. | "Nightingale" | King, Palmer | 3:40 |
| 9. | "Been to Canaan" | | 3:43 |
| 10. | "Smackwater Jack" | Gerry Goffin, King | 3:45 |
| 11. | "Corazón" | | 3:58 |
| 12. | "Believe in Humanity" | | 3:23 |

=== 1999 re-release ===
The 1999 re-release features the original album digitally remastered along with two additional live recordings from the album Carnegie Hall Concert: June 18, 1971.

Bonus tracks
| No. | Title | Writer(s) | Length |
|---|---|---|---|
| 13. | "Eventually" (live) | Goffin, King | 4:43 |
| 14. | "(You Make Me Feel Like) A Natural Woman" (live) | Goffin, King, Jerry Wexler | 4:12 |

== Charts ==
=== Weekly charts ===
| Chart (1978) | Position |
|---|---|
| United States Billboard 200 | 47 |
| Australia (Kent Music Report) | 73 |

=== Certifications ===
| Region | Certification |
|---|---|
| Canada (Music Canada) | Gold |
| United States (RIAA) | Platinum |

== Personnel ==
- Carole King - keyboards, vocals, backing vocals, arrangement, conductor
- Ralph Schuckett - organ, electric piano
- James Taylor - acoustic guitar, backing vocals
- Danny "Kootch" Kortchmar - electric guitar, congas
- Dean Parks - guitar
- Waddy Wachtel - electric guitar
- David T. Walker - electric guitar
- Charles Larkey - electric bass
- Lee Sklar - electric bass
- Russ Kunkel - drums
- Harvey Mason - drums
- Andy Newmark - drums
- Joel O'Brien - drums
- Ms. Bobbye Hall - percussion
- Ralph MacDonald - percussion
- Teresa Calderon - congas
- Tom Scott - saxophone
- Mike Altschul - saxophone, woodwinds
- Ernie Watts - saxophone, woodwinds
- Curtis Amy - tenor saxophone, soprano saxophone, baritone saxophone, flute
- Oscar Brashear - flugelhorn
- Charlie Loper - trombone
- Dick "Slyde" Hyde - trombone
- George Bohanon - trombone, euphonium
- Ollie Mitchell - trumpet, flugelhorn
- Chuck Findley - trumpet, flugelhorn
- Albert Aarons - trumpet, flugelhorn
- William Green - woodwinds
- William Collette - woodwinds
- Plas Johnson - woodwinds
- Norman Kurban and David Campbell - string conducting & arrangement
- Merry Clayton - backing vocals
- Louise Goffin - backing vocals
- Sherry Goffin - backing vocals
- Julia Tillman - backing vocals
