= A Natural Woman =

A Natural Woman may refer to:

- "(You Make Me Feel Like) A Natural Woman", a 1967 song by Aretha Franklin
- A Natural Woman (album), a 1969 album by Peggy Lee
- A Natural Woman (memoir), a 2012 memoir by Carole King
