= Wanda Nevada =

1979 film

- Promotional poster
- Directed by: Peter Fonda
- Written by: Dennis Hackin
- Produced by: William Hayward; Dennis Hackin; Neal Dobrofsky
- Starring: Peter Fonda; Brooke Shields; Fiona Lewis; Luke Askew; Ted Markland
- Cinematography: Michael Butler
- Edited by: Scott Conrad
- Music by: Ken Lauber
- Distributed by: United Artists
- Release date: May 25, 1979
- Running time: 107 minutes
- Country: United States
- Language: English
- Box office: $2,411,145

Wanda Nevada is a 1979 American Western film directed by Peter Fonda, who co-stars alongside Brooke Shields as the eponymous character, with Fiona Lewis, Luke Askew and Ted Markland in supporting roles. This was Fonda's last feature film as director.

Henry Fonda makes a cameo appearance as an Arizona prospector, making it the only film to feature the father and son together. Peter Fonda reportedly paid Henry $1,000 for one day's work on the film after receiving a call from his father that he was out of work.

== Plot ==
Set in 1950s Arizona, the story follows a drifter and gambler named Beaudray Demerille. In a card game, he wins the movie's title character, Wanda Nevada, a 13-year-old orphan with dreams of singing at the Grand Ole Opry.

Despite his best efforts, Wanda sticks to Demerille, accompanying him to a pool hall. Texas Curly, an aging prospector, enters and tells the bar patrons about his gold mine in the Grand Canyon. They laugh him off as a drunk. As Curly leaves the bar, he drops a pouch. Wanda picks it up and follows Curly, then sees Strap Pangburn and Ruby Muldoon, two cons from the bar, harassing the man about the location of the mine. Wanda runs when Strap and Ruby kill Curly, alerting them to her presence. She hides in Demerille's car and tells him about Curly's death. Strap and Ruby see Wanda in the car but get lost in the chase. Stopped for the night, Demerille and Wanda open Curly's pouch and find a map. They head to the Grand Canyon and trade the car for pack mules and mining supplies, and hear tales of Apache ghosts who haunt the canyon. Strap and Ruby follow by half a day.

While traveling in the canyon, Demerille and Wanda meet Dorothy Deerfield, a Life magazine photographer. Dorothy and Beau try to get better acquainted after dinner in her tent, but the jealous Wanda intrudes. They discuss their pasts, with Dorothy's husband and Wanda's father both killed during World War II military service. Demerille tries to be nice but comes off as insensitive, and he and Wanda leave camp in the morning. They find a rope ladder over the canyon's side leading to a small cave. Before going down, Wanda confesses to Beau that she loves him. He holds the rope as she rappels down the rock wall. An owl flies out at her and Wanda falls. Beau pulls her up, only to find that she is unconscious. He sits cradling Wanda and says he loves her, too.

Demerille explores the cave and finds gold. He returns to find Wanda awake and shows her a large gold nugget. While mining the next day, Strap and Ruby finally catch up to them, watching them from a distance. Wanda and Demerille return to camp with four bags of gold, only to find their mules gone and Indian arrows sticking into the ground. Figuring the only way they will get out of the canyon alive is to ditch the gold, they throw the bags into the canyon by the river in case someone is watching, then start walking. Strap and Ruby confront them, hold them at gunpoint and demand the gold; but Wanda insists there was none. A shootout leaves everyone unharmed, and Strap and Ruby run off.

Beau and Wanda seek shelter for the night. The following morning they find Strap and Ruby crucified in the desert. Wanda finds the bags of mined gold scattered nearby. They pack it up and head down to the shore, where a boat is buried in the sand. After rowing downstream and coming ashore for the night, Demerille counts the gold as Wanda sleeps. The owl from the cave appears, and a glowing arrow is shot from the cliff above their campsite into Demerille's chest. Seemingly mortally wounded, he pushes the boat out into the river and passes out in the bow. Wanda wakes up the next morning to find the boat is adrift in the river and Beau near the edge of death. He professes his love for Wanda and passes out.

Some time later, Wanda is in a hotel, about to be sent off to the reformatory by looming nuns. Reporters swarm the hotel lobby, all trying to get an exclusive story. Wanda flees the nuns as Beau, now recovered and rich from selling and investing the gold, arrives in a new convertible outside the hotel. Wanda jumps in the convertible, and both laugh as Demerille tells the reporters, "Everyone knows there's no gold in the Grand Canyon!" He and Wanda drive off into the sunset, while the song Morning Sun by Carole King adds to the atmospheric finale.

== Cast ==
- Brooke Shields as Wanda Nevada
- Peter Fonda as Beaudray Demerille
- Fiona Lewis as Dorothy Deerfield
- Luke Askew as Ruby Muldoon
- Ted Markland as Strap Pangburn
- Severn Darden as Bitterstix
- Paul Fix as Texas Curly
- Larry Golden as Slade
- Henry Fonda as Prospector

== Production ==
Parts of the film were shot in Glen Canyon, Monument Valley, Mexican Hat and the Colorado River in Utah, as well as Prescott, Arizona.

Peter Fonda said, "U.A. dumped the film.... The studio just didn’t understand the picture... I had wanted them to sell the film back to me. I offered the studio six million dollars... They didn’t take me up on it."

The Carole King song "Morning Sun" was featured in the film.

== Reception ==
Todd McCarthy of Variety called the film "a serio-comic romance which is unconvincing on virtually every level. What charm it has stems from the quirky convergence of several different genres, but Peter Fonda's third directorial outing is all but sunk by Brooke Shields' critically deficient performance."

Gene Siskel of the Chicago Tribune awarded 2 stars out of 4, and called it "a desperate film trying to make it through in bits and pieces rather than through one consistently written script."

Kevin Thomas of the Los Angeles Times was generally positive and wrote, "It's all stuff and nonsense—your typical 'relationship' movie—but it's pretty ingratiating all the same. The neophyte Hackin seems a born storyteller, and Fonda, who also directs, brings a depth of perception and feeling to 'Wanda Nevada' that makes it quite appealing."

Rick Groen of The Globe and Mail declared the film "the least able fable imaginable. Screenwriter Dennis Hackin's idea of profundity is to toss in characters and ideas like so many candies into a grab bag, and with just as much substance... It also contains every piece of clichéd Western dialogue ever uttered. One kindly assumes that was deliberate, but cliches in themselves, put to no larger purpose, don't make a film camp or ironic. They just make it bad."

== Sequel ==
According to a May 29, 1979 Daily Variety item, Peter Fonda planned a sequel titled, Wanda Havana, and was given permission to film on location in Cuba, but no further information about the project has been found.

== Home media ==
The film has been released on DVD and in the digital format.
