= Rhymes & Reasons =

Rhymes & Reasons may refer to:

- Rhymes & Reasons (John Denver album), or the title song, 1969
- Rhymes & Reasons (Carole King album), 1972
