= Thoroughbred (album) =

Studio album by Carole King
- Released: January 13, 1976
- Studio: A&M (Hollywood)
- Genres: Pop, soft rock
- Length: 33:11
- Labels: Ode / A&M (Original Issue); Ode / Epic (Re-issue)
- Producer: Lou Adler

Carole King chronology
Really Rosie (1975)	Thoroughbred (1976)	Simple Things (1977)

Thoroughbred is the seventh studio album by American singer-songwriter Carole King, released in 1976. Her final release on Ode Records, it was produced by Lou Adler, who had been her collaborator since Tapestry (1971). After Carole King self-produced for a number of years on Capitol and Atlantic Records, Lou Adler later rejoined King to produce her 1984 album Speeding Time.

The track "Only Love Is Real" was released as a lead single from the album and became King's 4th and final chart-topper on the U.S. Billboard Adult Contemporary chart. "High Out of Time", a song featuring David Crosby and Graham Nash on vocals, was also released as a single. The track "There's a Space Between Us" features harmony vocals by James Taylor.

== Critical reception ==
Professional ratings
Review scores
Source	Rating
AllMusic	3/5 stars
Rolling Stone	(positive)

Cash Box called "High Out of Time" "a sweet ballad, filled with Carole King's expected but always exciting melody hooks." Record World called "High Out of Time" a "thoughtful and moving story as only this songstress can relate."

Barry Miles of NME said, "There are no surprises here. No outstanding tracks. Just an album by someone living a reasonably happy life in Los Angeles."

== Track listing ==
All songs written by Carole King, except where noted.

Side one

1. "So Many Ways" – 3:11
2. "Daughter of Light" (Gerry Goffin, King) – 3:11
3. "High Out of Time" (Goffin, King) – 3:15
4. "Only Love is Real" – 3:29
5. "There's a Space Between Us" – 3:20

Side two

1. "I'd Like to Know You Better" – 2:48
2. "We All Have to Be Alone" (Goffin, King) – 3:44
3. "Ambrosia" (King, Dave Palmer) – 3:16
4. "Still Here Thinking of You" (Goffin, King) – 3:11
5. "It's Gonna Work Out Fine" – 3:50

== Personnel ==
- Carole King – piano, vocals, backing vocals
- Danny "Kootch" Kortchmar – guitar, vocals
- Russ Kunkel – drums
- Ralph MacDonald – percussion
- David Crosby – backing vocals
- Graham Nash – backing vocals
- Tom Scott – saxophone
- Leland Sklar – bass guitar
- JD Souther – backing vocals
- James Taylor – guitar, backing vocals
- Waddy Wachtel – guitar

Production notes

- Lou Adler – producer
- Milt Calice – engineer
- Hank Cicalo – engineer

== Charts ==
=== Weekly charts ===
Chart (1976)	Position
Australia (Kent Music Report)	87
Canadian RPM Albums Chart	9
Japanese Oricon Albums Chart	7
US Billboard 200	3

=== Year-end charts ===
Chart (1976)	Position
U.S. Billboard Year-End	85

== Certifications ==
Region	Certification
United States (RIAA)	Gold
