= Nightingale (Carole King song) =

Single by Carole King

from the album Wrap Around Joy
- B-side: "You're Something New"
- Released: December 17, 1974
- Genre: Pop rock
- Length: 3:36
- Label: Ode Records
- Songwriter(s): Carole King and David Palmer
- Producer(s): Lou Adler

Carole King singles chronology
"Jazzman" (1974)	"Nightingale" (1974)	"Only Love Is Real" (1976)

"Nightingale" is a song written by Carole King and David Palmer. "Nightingale" first appeared on King's top-selling album Wrap Around Joy, which was released in mid-July 1974, but was released as a single in December. The song has since been put on many of her compilation albums, including her certified platinum album Her Greatest Hits: Songs of Long Ago.

The song, like the album Wrap Around Joy, got off to a slow start, but eventually charted high. "Nightingale" peaked at No. 9 on the Billboard Hot 100 on March 1, 1975, and spent the week before at No. 1 on the Easy Listening chart.

== Recording ==
While Carole King is the lead singer of this song in the 1974 version, her daughters Louise Goffin and Sherry Goffin sang backup. At the time, they were children.

== Reception ==
Billboard stated that "Nightingale" is a return to her earlier style compared to her previous single "Jazzman" and has "fine soft melodies set off by her distinctive vocalizing." Cash Box said that the "solid hook cements the powerful combination of sharp lyrics and catchy musical feel." Record World said that it "combines melodic beauty with momentum extraordinaire to come up with a performance in super league with [King's] recent chart-topper 'Jazzman.'"

The song is a critical part of the plot in The Night Bird, a psychological suspense novel by Brian Freeman. In the novel, the song is used as a trigger to awaken hypnotically suppressed phobias in psychiatric patients, causing them to commit suicide.

== Charts ==
Chart (1974–75)	Peak position
Billboard Hot 100	9
Billboard Easy Listening	1

== See also ==
- List of number-one adult contemporary singles of 1975 (U.S.)
