= Molly Larkey =

American artist

Molly Larkey (born December 31, 1971) is an American multi-disciplinary artist based in Los Angeles. Her work includes sculpture, painting, and drawing, often using abstract shapes to explore social and political ideas. Larkey's work has been featured in exhibitions at MoMA PS1, the SculptureCenter, and The Saatchi Gallery. She is also a co-founder of the People's Pottery Project, a non-profit studio in Los Angeles that supports formerly incarcerated individuals through the arts.

== Early life and education ==
Larkey was born in Los Angeles. Her parents are the singer Carole King and the bass player Charles Larkey. She received her Bachelor of Arts from Columbia University and her Master of Fine Arts from Rutgers University.

== Work and style ==
Larkey's art often focuses on how we use language and symbols. In her early career, she was known for detailed drawings on paper, but after moving to Los Angeles, she began creating "sculptural paintings" large, three-dimensional works made from steel, linen, and hand-mixed paint. Critics have described her aesthetic as a combination of industrial materials and organic shapes. In her series The More Things Change, Larkey used hand-shaped steel to create forms that diverge from the traditional constraints of minimalist sculpture.

== Social practice and writing ==
In 2019, Larkey co-founded People's Pottery Project alongside Ilka Perkins and Domonique Perkins. It is a nonprofit ceramics studio offering job training and creative space for formerly incarcerated women, trans, and non-binary individuals.

Larkey has published essays in Los Angeles Review of Books, Contemporary Art Review Los Angeles (CARLA), and Haunt Journal of Art.

== Selected exhibitions ==
2000

- Rutgers University, New Brunswick, New Jersey

2001

- An Exhibition of Works by Contemporary Women Artists, Bobbie Greenfield Gallery, Santa Monica

2004

- Black Milk, Marvelli Gallery, New York

2005

- LineAge, The Drawing Center, New York
- Off My Biscuit, Destroy Your District!, Samson Projects, Boston

2007

- Project Room, PS1 Contemporary Arts Center, Long Island City
- M*A*S*H, Smith-Stewart, New York
- I Died For Beauty, Newman Popiashvilli Gallery, New York
- Da Damage, Jack the Pelican Presents, Brooklyn
