= Ted Markland =

American actor (1933–2011)

- Born: January 15, 1933; United States
- Died: December 18, 2011 (aged 78); Yucca Valley, California, U.S.
- Occupation: Actor

Ted Markland (January 15, 1933 – December 18, 2011) was an American character actor.

Markland is best known for the role of Reno in the NBC television series The High Chaparral.

Markland had a small part in the television Western Bat Masterson (S2E21 as Rancher "Lem Taylor").

== Filmography ==
Television RolesFilm
Year	Title	Role	Notes
1959	Wanted: Dead or Alive	Deputy	Episode: (The Tyrant)
1982	Father Murphy	Frank	Episodes : (Matthew and Elizabeth, The First Miracle Parts 1 & 2, Father Figure)
1982	Knight Rider	Sergeant Wallace	Episode: (No Big Thing)
1991	Hunter	Dirk Baker	Final Episode of the series: (Little Man with a Big Reputation)
1993	Renegade	'Pappy' Boyd	Episode: (The Hot Tip)
1994	Baywatch	Laimbeer	S4.E21: (Trading Places)
Year	Title	Role	Notes
1961	The Great Impostor	Seaman	Uncredited
1965	The Hallelujah Trail	Bandmaster	
1967	Waterhole No. 3	Soldier #2	
1968	Blackbeard's Ghost	Charles	
1968	Angels from Hell	Smiley	
1971	The Hired Hand	Luke	
1971	The Last Movie	Big Brother	
1971	Welcome Home, Soldier Boys	Hick #1	
1972	Doomsday Machine	Unknown	
1972	Play It Again, Sam	Hood #2	
1972	Ulzana's Raid	Trooper #2	
1973	Jory	Corporal 'Hap' Evans	
1975	One Flew Over the Cuckoo's Nest	'Hap' Arlich	
1976	Fighting Mad	Hal Fraser	
1977	The Great Gundown	Herien	
1977	Which Way Is Up?	Goon	
1979	Wanda Nevada	'Strap' Pangburn	
1981	King of the Mountain	Limo Driver	
1986	Eye of the Tiger	Floyd	
1987	Best Seller	Man In Bar	
1988	Colors	3rd C.R.A.S.H. Officer	
1989	Liberty & Bash	'Smitty' Smith	
1990	Catchfire	Man In Van	Uncredited
1990	Another 48 Hrs.	Malcolm Price	
1990	Fatal Mission	CIA Agent	also known as Enemy
1993	Merlin	Vandersman	
1993	Live by the Fist	Sacker	
1993	American Kickboxer 2	Xavier	
1994	Confessions of a Hitman	Mickey	
1994	The Outsider	Colonel Howling	
1995	Wild Bill	Tommy Drum	
1995	The Friends of Harry	Bradley	
1995	Guns and Lipstick	Sebastian	
1995	Blood Ring 2	Collantes	
1996	Last Man Standing	Deputy Bob	
1997	Switchback	Bartender	
1997	Ground Rules	Victor	
2003	Fabulous Shiksa in Distress	Smiley	
2006	Cyxork 7	Jake Sternoff	(final film role)
