= A Holiday Carole =

Studio album by Carole King
- Released: November 1, 2011
- Recorded: 2010, 2011
- Studio: Village Studios
- Genres: Pop, holiday
- Labels: Hear Music, Concord Music Group
- Producer: Louise Goffin

Carole King chronology
| The Essential Carole King (2010) | ''A Holiday Carole'' (2011) | The Legendary Demos (2012) |

A Holiday Carole (titled A Christmas Carole in the UK and Australia) is the seventeenth studio album and first holiday album by American singer-songwriter Carole King, released on November 1, 2011. It is King's 17th studio album and her first studio album in 10 years since she released Love Makes the World as well as her last studio album to date. It was recorded by Nathaniel Kunkel and Niko Bolas.

At the 55th Annual Grammy Awards, A Holiday Carole was nominated for Best Traditional Pop Vocal Album, but the award went to Paul McCartney for Kisses on the Bottom.

== History ==
On November 4, 2010, King's daughter, Louise Goffin, revealed on Myspace that she was working with Carole King on her first-ever holiday album, stating, "I am currently busy in the studio producing the new Carole King Holiday Record, set to release in 2011. We've had a fabulous time so far, working with the amazing Nathaniel Kunkel (engineer) and many talented musicians and background singers." However, no statements were made by King until on June 22, 2011, when a picture was posted on her Facebook profile with the caption "CK on upcoming holiday album: 'So this is what it boils down to...'"

On July 27, 2011, Billboard posted an article on the home page of its official website, stating various information about the record, including the first official announcement of the title of the album. The article stated that A Holiday Carole will "span an array of musical styles", including Latin and jazz.

== Track listing ==
On July 28, 2011, USA Today revealed the official track list.

| No. | Title | Writer(s) | Length |
|---|---|---|---|
| 1. | "My Favorite Things" | Richard Rodgers, Oscar Hammerstein II | 3:21 |
| 2. | "Carol of the Bells" | Mykola Leontovych | 1:56 |
| 3. | "Sleigh Ride" | Leroy Anderson, Mitchell Parish | 2:31 |
| 4. | "Christmas Paradise" | Louise Goffin, George Noriega, Jodi Marr | 3:25 |
| 5. | "Every Day Will Be Like a Holiday" | William Bell, Booker T. Jones | 3:08 |
| 6. | "Chanukah Prayer" (with Louise Goffin & grandson) | Traditional; arranged by Louise Goffin and Lee Curreri | 3:09 |
| 7. | "Have Yourself a Merry Little Christmas" | Ralph Blane, Hugh Martin | 2:33 |
| 8. | "I've Got My Love to Keep Me Warm" | Irving Berlin | 2:54 |
| 9. | "Christmas in the Air" | Louise Goffin, Marr | 3:19 |
| 10. | "Do You Hear What I Hear" | Gloria Shayne Baker, Noël Regney | 3:33 |
| 11. | "This Christmas" | Donny Hathaway, Nadine McKinnor | 3:20 |
| 12. | "New Year's Day" | Louise Goffin, Guy Chambers | 3:55 |

Target deluxe edition bonus tracks
| No. | Title | Writer(s) | Length |
|---|---|---|---|
| 13. | "Lo, How a Rose E'er Blooming" | Traditional; English lyrics by Theodore Baker |
| 14. | "Last Christmas" | George Michael |
| 15. | "New Year's Day" (Acoustic Version) | Louise Goffin, Chambers |

Amazon MP3 deluxe edition bonus tracks
| No. | Title | Writer(s) | Length |
|---|---|---|---|
| 13. | "Welcome Home" (1978) | Carole King | 3:17 |
| 14. | "One Fine Day" (1980) | Gerry Goffin, Carole King | 2:30 |
| 15. | "Good Mountain People" (1979) | King | 3:37 |
| 16. | "In the Name of Love" (1977) | King | 3:04 |

Unlike previous albums released by King, none of the songs were written or co-written by her (excluding the bonus tracks).

== Charts ==
| Chart (2011) | Peak position |
|---|---|
| US Billboard 200 | 52 |
| US Billboard Holiday Albums | 8 |
