= Really Rosie =

Musical by Maurice Sendak and Carole King

- Music: Carole King
- Lyrics: Maurice Sendak
- Book: Maurice Sendak
- Productions: 1975 Animated TV Special; 1980 Off-Broadway; 2017 Off-Broadway

Really Rosie is a musical with a book and lyrics by Maurice Sendak and music by Carole King. The musical is based on Sendak's books Chicken Soup with Rice, Pierre, One was Johnny, Alligators All Around (which comprise 1962's The Nutshell Library), and The Sign on Rosie's Door (1960). Sendak based the story on a demonstrative little girl who used to sing and dance on the stoop of her building, whom he observed while he was a little boy growing up in Brooklyn. The show follows a typical summer day in the life of the Nutshell Kids, a group of several neighborhood friends, including Pierre, Alligator, Johnny, and Chicken Soup from the Nutshell Library books, and Rosie and Kathy from The Sign on Rosie's Door. Rosie, the self-proclaimed sassiest kid on her block of Brooklyn's Avenue P, entertains everyone by directing and starring in a movie based on the exciting, dramatic, funny (and slightly exaggerated) story of her life.

A half-hour animated television special aired on CBS TV on February 19, 1975. It was directed by Maurice Sendak, animated by Ronald Fritz and Dan Hunn of D&R Productions Inc., with Carole King voicing the title character. King was ultimately selected as the voice of Rosie when casting directors had difficulty selecting a child actor whose voice could complement the pre-recorded songs. An album of the songs by King and lyrics by Sendak is available on Ode/Epic/SME Records. In the animated special, only the first seven songs and Really Rosie (Reprise) were showcased.

Sendak expanded the piece for London and Washington, DC, stage productions in 1978, and an off-Broadway production, directed and choreographed by Patricia Birch with designs by Sendak, which opened on October 14, 1980, at the Westside Theatre, where it ran for 274 performances. During its off-Broadway run, the lead role of Rosie was first played by a then-12-year-old Tisha Campbell-Martin. Midway through the run, Tisha left the cast and was replaced by cast member and "Rosie" understudy Angela Coin, age 10. Angela also sang the role of "Rosie" on the cast recording.

The musical has become a mainstay of children's theater groups. It was also one of John Mulaney's main inspirations for his Netflix Special John Mulaney & the Sack Lunch Bunch.

== Plot ==
Rosie and the Nutshell Kids (Johnny, Alligator, Pierre, and Kathy) live on the same block on Avenue P in Brooklyn, New York. On a hot July day, the children are bored and need something to do. Rosie imagines herself as a talented star, and decides to produce an imaginary musical about her life and in particular the demise of her boyfriend Chicken Soup, called Did You Hear What Happened to Chicken Soup?

She gets her friends to audition for a role in the film, but they begin to fight over casting. A thunderstorm forces them to move into the cellar for shelter. To keep the kids' attention, Rosie decides that they need to show the producer the movie's big finale number. She gets them all to close their eyes and imagine the producer inviting them to make her movie. Afterward, when the children go home, Rosie remains to dream of stardom in her big number.

== Voice cast ==
- Carole King as Rosie
- Dale Soules as Pierre/Chicken Soup
- Alice Playten as Alligator
- Baillie Gerstein as Kathy
- Mark Hampton as Johnny
- Maurice Sendak as Jenny's bark
- Bingo Wyer as Buttermilk's meow
- Andrew Riss as Special Whistle

== Reception ==
Really Rosie was named to the ALA Notable Children's Videos list in 1976.

== Home media ==
- The special was released uncut on VHS by Children's Circle in 1993.
- Though the special has never been released in its entirety on DVD, the Carole King song adaptations of The Nutshell Library, set to the 1999 remastered CD version of the soundtrack, were made available on the very first Scholastic Video Collection/Storybook Treasures DVD "Where The Wild Things Are and more Maurice Sendak Stories" released on September 24, 2002. Only one song, "The Ballad of Chicken Soup", was omitted from the release due to concerning children of self-strangulation imitating the characters.

== Soundtrack ==
Really Rosie

Soundtrack album by Carole King
- Released: February 1975; May 25, 1999 (CD reissue)
- Recorded: 1974
- Genres: Children's music, soft rock
- Length: 33:24 (Original album); 35:50 (CD reissue)
- Labels: Ode; Epic
- Producers: Lou Adler; Sheldon Riss

Carole King chronology
Wrap Around Joy (1974)	Really Rosie (1975)	Thoroughbred (1976)

Professional ratings
Review scores
Source	Rating
AllMusic	link
Christgau's Record Guide	B+

Really Rosie the soundtrack album was released by Ode Records in February 1975. The album peaked at No. 20 on the Billboard 200.

AllMusic called it "that rare children's album with the wit and intelligence to capture the imaginations of adult listeners as well."

=== Track listing ===
Lyrics by Maurice Sendak, music by Carole King.

Side 1

1. "Really Rosie" – 1:51
2. "One Was Johnny" – 2:08
3. "Alligators All Around" – 1:54
4. "Pierre" – 5:38
5. "Screaming and Yelling" – 1:16
6. "The Ballad of Chicken Soup" – 2:15
7. "Chicken Soup with Rice" – 4:20

Side 2

8. "Avenue P" – 3:03
9. "My Simple Humble Neighborhood" – 3:07
10. "The Awful Truth" – 3:11
11. "Such Sufferin'" – 2:55
12. "Really Rosie" (Reprise) – 1:40

Bonus track (1999 remaster)

13. "Really Rosie" (Original piano demo)

On cassette versions, "Chicken Soup with Rice" is repeated on Side 2 to even out the playing times of each side.

=== Personnel ===
- Carole King – vocals, piano
- Charles Larkey – bass
- Andy Newmark – drums
- Louise Goffin, Sherry Goffin – background vocals
- Hank Cicalo, Milt Calice – engineers
- Maurice Sendak – lyrics, story, artwork
- Ronald Fritz, Dan Hunn – animation producers/animation directors

=== Chart position ===
Year	Country	Chart	Position
1975	United States	Billboard 200	20

== Stage play ==
The stage version of Really Rosie follows a similar plot to the animated special, with a few key changes:

- The cut songs have been reinstated, scattered in between the original track list.
- Chicken Soup is now Rosie's younger brother, whom her mother forces her to watch over. Rosie's annoyance and anger toward this scares Chicken Soup into hiding, leading to the plot of her movie.
- Alligator is no longer a real alligator, but rather a human child obsessed with reptiles (to the point of dressing as one). The other kids tease him for this and try to force him to eat Rosie.
- The Nutshell Kids are expanded to include every child in the neighborhood. This is done to give the show a larger ensemble.
- Kathy is given a larger role, her own musical number ("The Awful Truth") and the full name of Kathy Grossman.
