= Welcome Home (Carole King album) =

Studio album by Carole King
- Released: 1978
- Recorded: January 1978
- Studio: Sound Labs (Hollywood)
- Genre: Pop; rock
- Label: Capitol
- Producer: Carole King, Norm Kinney

Carole King chronology
Simple Things (1977)	Welcome Home (1978)	Her Greatest Hits: Songs of Long Ago (1978)

Professional ratings
Review scores
Source	Rating
AllMusic	2/5 stars
The Rolling Stone Album Guide	2/5 stars

Welcome Home is the ninth album by the American singer-songwriter Carole King, released in 1978.

The song "Morning Sun" from the album was featured in the 1979 film Wanda Nevada.

== Track listing ==
All songs by Carole King except where noted.

1. "Main Street Saturday Night"
2. "Sunbird" (King, Rick Evers)
3. "Venusian Diamond" (King, Evers, Mark Hallman, Robert McEntee, Robb Galloway, Miguel Rivera, Richard Hardy, Michael Wooten)
4. "Changes"
5. "Morning Sun"
6. "Disco Tech" (King, Hallman, McEntee, Galloway, Rivera, Wooten, Hardy)
7. "Wings of Love" (King, Evers)
8. "Ride the Music"
9. "Everybody's Got the Spirit"
10. "Welcome Home"

== Personnel ==
- Carole King – vocals, background vocals, string arrangements
- Robert McEntee – guitar, background vocals
- Mark Hallman – guitars, background vocals
- Rob Galloway – bass, background vocals
- Michael Wooten – drums
- Miguel Rivera – congas, percussion
- Richard Hardy – flute, saxophone, clarinet, vocals
- George Bohanon – trombone, horn arrangement
- Dick Hyde – trombone
- Ernie Watts – saxophone
- Nolan Andrew Smith, Jr – trumpet, fluegelhorn
- Oscar Brashear – trumpet, fluegelhorn
- Charles Veal, Jr. – concertmaster, violin
- Israel Baker – violin
- Frank Foster – violin
- William H. Henderson – violin
- Marcia Van Dyke – violin
- Dorothy Wade – violin
- John Wittenberg – violin
- Kenneth Yerke – violin
- Rollice Dale – viola
- Denyse Buffum – viola
- Dennis Karmazyn – cello
- Ronald Cooper – cello
- The Trio on "Changes" was played by Charles Veal, Rollice Dale, Dennis Karmazyn
- Bob Harrington – hammer dulcimer
- Anne Golia – tamboura
- Georgia Kelly – harp
- Rick Evers – cowbell
- Carole King, Mark Hallman, Robert McEntee, Richard Hardy, Stephanie Spruill, Alexandra Brown, Ann White – choir

== Charts ==
Chart (1978)	Peak position
Australia (Kent Music Report)	69
US Billboard Top LPs & Tape	104
