= The Legendary Demos =

Compilation album by Carole King
- Released: April 24, 2012
- Recorded: 1962–1971
- Genre: Folk rock, soft rock, pop rock
- Label: Hear Music, Rockingale Records

Carole King chronology
A Holiday Carole (2011)	The Legendary Demos (2012)

The Legendary Demos is a compilation album by pop rock artist Carole King. It was released on April 24, 2012 on Hear Music. The album contains thirteen demo recordings, ranging in time from "Crying in the Rain" (1962) to six tracks that appeared on King's 1971 hit album Tapestry. "The Legendary Demos" was given a limited reissue on ivory/clear vinyl for Record Store Day in 2023 on King's own Rockingale Records imprint.

== Track listing ==
1. "Pleasant Valley Sunday" (Carole King, Gerry Goffin) - 2:26
2. "So Goes Love" (Carole King, Gerry Goffin) - 2:52
3. "Take Good Care of My Baby" (Carole King, Gerry Goffin) - 2:17
4. "(You Make Me Feel Like) A Natural Woman" (Carole King, Gerry Goffin, Jerry Wexler) - 2:51
5. "Like Little Children" (Carole King, Gerry Goffin) - 3:12
6. "Beautiful" (Carole King) - 2:23
7. "Crying in the Rain" (Carole King, Howard Greenfield) - 1:48
8. "Way Over Yonder" (Carole King) - 3:24
9. "Yours Until Tomorrow" (Carole King, Gerry Goffin) - 3:16
10. "It's Too Late" (Carole King, Toni Stern) - 3:29
11. "Tapestry" (Carole King) - 3:00
12. "Just Once in My Life" (Carole King, Gerry Goffin, Phil Spector) - 4:02
13. "You've Got a Friend" (Carole King) - 4:09

== Charts ==
Year	Country	Position
2012	Billboard 200 (US)	56
