= Touch the Sky (Carole King album) =

Studio album by Carole King
- Released: June 1979
- Recorded: March 1979
- Studios: Pecan Street (Austin, Texas)
- Genres: Rock, pop
- Length: 39:08
- Label: Capitol
- Producers: Carole King, Mark Hallman

Carole King chronology
Her Greatest Hits: Songs of Long Ago (1978)	Touch the Sky (1979)	Pearls: Songs of Goffin and King (1980)

Touch the Sky is the tenth studio album by the American musician Carole King, released in June 1979. Produced by King and Mark Hallman, it was recorded in Austin, Texas, with Jerry Jeff Walker's band.

== Critical reception ==
Professional ratings
Review scores
Source	Rating
AllMusic	2/5 stars
The Encyclopedia of Popular Music	2/5 stars
The Rolling Stone Album Guide	2/5 stars

The New York Times noted that "the songs and the musical idiom in general are tougher than in the past, full of the slightly raunchy Southern rock that characterizes Mr. Walker's work."

== Track listing ==
All songs by Carole King.

Side one
No.	Title	Length
1.	"Time Gone By"	4:13
2.	"Move Lightly"	4:58
3.	"Dreamlike I Wander"	3:50
4.	"Walk with Me"	2:52
5.	"Good Mountain People"	3:23

Side two
No.	Title	Length
1.	"You Still Want Her"	4:39
2.	"Passing of the Days"	2:48
3.	"Crazy"	4:00
4.	"Eagle"	4:35
5.	"Seeing Red"	3:50
Total length:		39:08

== Personnel ==
- Carole King – lead vocals, background vocals, guitar, piano
- Reese Wynans – piano, keyboards
- Dave Perkins – guitar, background vocals
- Ron Cobb – bass, saxophone, flute, background vocals
- Bobby Rambo – guitar, background vocals
- Mark Hallman – guitar, mandolin, synthesizer, background vocals
- Leo LeBlanc – pedal steel guitar, background vocals
- Fred Krc – drums, percussion, background vocals
- Miguel Rivera – congas, percussion
- Tomas Ramirez – saxophone, flute, recorder, background vocals
- Richard Hardy – saxophone

Production

- Produced by Carole King and Mark Hallman
- Engineered by Chet Himes
- Mastered by Bernie Grundman
- Jim McGuire – photography
- James Flournoy/Wonder Graphics – art direction, design

== Chart positions ==
Chart (1979)	Position
Australia (Kent Music Report)	84
Canada RPM Albums Chart	62
US Billboard Top LPs & Tape	104
