= Northern Rockies Ecosystem Protection Act =

Proposed United States legislation

The Northern Rocky Mountains ecosystem in the United States is known by ecologists, biologists, and naturalists as one of the last areas of the contiguous United States that is relatively undeveloped enough and large enough to support a functioning ecosystem. The Northern Rockies Ecosystem Protection Act is designed to protect this ecosystem and the many threatened and endangered species such as grizzly bears (threatened), bull trout (threatened), sockeye salmon (endangered only in Snake River Evolutionary Significant Unit, secure elsewhere), and Canadian lynx (threatened only in lower U.S. 48 states, secure elsewhere), while creating jobs that restore old roads and clear cuts. The Alliance for the Wild Rockies based in Helena, Montana has been campaigning for the legislation for two decades with the help of numerous Congresspersons, celebrities, and grassroots groups such as the Sierra Club and the Wilderness Society. The legislation has been introduced and discussed in Congress five times since 1993, most recently in November 2011 with 34 co-sponsors by December 2012.

== Details of the legislation ==
The legislation would affect roadless areas in five states, including 9,500,000 acres (38,000 km^{2}) in Idaho, 7 million in Montana, 5 million in Wyoming, 750,000 in eastern Oregon and 500,000 in eastern Washington. The total includes 3 million acres (12,000 km^{2}) in Yellowstone, Glacier and Grand Teton national parks. The NREPA does not affect private land.

The legislation will:

- Designate more than 24 million acres (97,000 km^{2}) of America's premier roadless lands as wilderness,
- Connect natural, biological corridors, ensuring the continued existence of native plants and animals,
- Keep water available for ranchers and farmers downstream until later in the season when it is most needed,
- Allow for historic uses such as hunting, fishing and firewood gathering,
- Create over 2,300 green jobs and a more sustainable economic base in the region,
- Save taxpayers $245 million over a 10-year period through the elimination of federally subsidized lumber harvests, mining and oil/gas production, and grazing allotments on federally owned land.

== Congressional Action ==
Congress	Short title	Bill number(s)	Date introduced	Sponsor(s)	# of cosponsors	Latest status
102nd Congress	Northern Rockies Ecosystem Protection Act of 1992	H.R. 5944	September 15, 1992	Peter H. Kostmayer (D-PA)	4	Died in committee
103rd Congress	Northern Rockies Ecosystem Protection Act of 1993	H.R. 2638	July 14, 1993	Carolyn Maloney (D-NY)	63	Died in committee
104th Congress	Northern Rockies Ecosystem Protection Act of 1995	H.R. 852	February 7, 1995	Carolyn Maloney (D-NY)	47	Died in committee
105th Congress	Northern Rockies Ecosystem Protection Act of 1997	H.R. 1425	April 23, 1997	Chris Shays (R-CT)	71	Died in committee
106th Congress	Northern Rockies Ecosystem Protection Act of 1999	H.R. 488	February 2, 1999	Chris Shays (R-CT)	110	Died in committee
107th Congress	Northern Rockies Ecosystem Protection Act of 2001	H.R. 488	February 6, 2001	Chris Shays (R-CT)	153	Died in committee
108th Congress	Northern Rockies Ecosystem Protection Act	H.R. 1105	March 5, 2003	Chris Shays (R-CT)	185	Died in committee
110th Congress	Northern Rockies Ecosystem Protection Act	H.R. 1975	April 20, 2007	Carolyn Maloney (D-NY)	139	Died in committee
111th Congress	Northern Rockies Ecosystem Protection Act	H.R. 980	February 11, 2009	Carolyn Maloney (D-NY)	104	Died in committee
112th Congress	Northern Rockies Ecosystem Protection Act	H.R. 3334	November 3, 2011	Carolyn Maloney (D-NY)	34	Died in committee
113th Congress	Northern Rockies Ecosystem Protection Act	H.R. 1187	March 14, 2013	Carolyn Maloney (D-NY)	31	Died in committee
114th Congress	Northern Rockies Ecosystem Protection Act	H.R. 996	February 13, 2015	Carolyn Maloney (D-NY)	37	Died in committee
114th Congress	Northern Rockies Ecosystem Protection Act	S. 3022	June 6, 2016	Sheldon Whitehouse (D-RI)	8	Died in committee
115th Congress	Northern Rockies Ecosystem Protection Act	H.R. 2135	April 25, 2017	Carolyn Maloney (D-NY)	59	Died in committee
115th Congress	Northern Rockies Ecosystem Protection Act	S. 936	April 25, 2017	Sheldon Whitehouse (D-RI)	12	Died in committee
116th Congress	Northern Rockies Ecosystem Protection Act	H.R. 1321	February 22, 2019	Carolyn Maloney (D-NY)	44	Died in committee
116th Congress	Northern Rockies Ecosystem Protection Act	S. 827	March 14, 2019	Sheldon Whitehouse (D-RI)	15	Died in committee
117th Congress	Northern Rockies Ecosystem Protection Act	H.R. 1755	March 10, 2021	Carolyn Maloney (D-NY)	44	Referred to committee
117th Congress	Northern Rockies Ecosystem Protection Act	S. 1276	March 21, 2021	Sheldon Whitehouse (D-RI)	11	Referred to committee

Carolyn B. Maloney, representative from the 14th district of New York most recently introduced the bill on November 3, 2011, and it had 34 cosponsors as of December 4, 2012. Representative Maloney also introduced the legislation in February 2009, as of December 1, 2009 there were 103 co-sponsoring Congresspersons in the House of Representatives. The singer Carole King, a resident of Custer County, Idaho, has testified before Congress in 1994, 2007 and 2009 in support of the act.

== Opposition to the Legislation ==
Opponents to the NREPA state that there will be a loss of extraction jobs in the northern Rockies; mining, logging, and oil/gas production as a whole account for many of the jobs in the five affected states. Economics professor Tom Power, Ph.D. from the University of Montana has found that industries based on extracting resources from the land are more prone to "boom and bust" economic cycles, creating ghost towns, and unstable living conditions, while economies that are based around wilderness areas are more sustainable and have higher than average job growth rates.

== Similar Ecosystem Protection Projects ==
There are other wildland protection projects currently being endeavoured by citizens around the world. In North America there are four wildlife corridors that have been proposed by the Wildlands Network, each providing a highway, called a "wildway", for migrating creatures to mitigate the effects of climate change: the Pacific Wildway running from Baja to Alaska, Boreal Wildway running west–east from Alaska, through Canada, to the northeastern shores of North America, the Eastern Wildway running from Everglades in Florida to the Arctic, and the Western Wildway also called the "spine of the continent" runs from southern Mexico along the Rocky Mountains up into the Arctic. The Yellowstone to Yukon Conservation Initiative (also known as Y2Y) is a bi-national NGO that promotes the conservation of habitats and wildlife movement ability from the Greater Yellowstone Ecosystem to the Arctic Circle.

== See also ==
- Conservation Biology
- Ecosystem
- Bioregion
- Biodiversity
