= One to One (Carole King album) =

Studio album by Carole King
- Released: 1982
- Recorded: 1982
- Studios: Studio South, (Austin, Texas); Kendun (Burbank, California)
- Genres: Pop; rock
- Length: 33:36
- Label: Atlantic
- Producers: Carole King; Mark Hallman

Carole King chronology
Pearls: Songs of Goffin and King (1980)	One to One (1982)	Speeding Time (1983)

One to One is the twelfth studio album by American singer-songwriter Carole King, released in 1982 by Atlantic Records. It is also the name of the accompanying concert video. The album peaked at number 119 on the Billboard 200.

One to One the video contains on-camera comments by Carole King as well as live performances from One to One the studio album and some of her best-known songs from previous LPs.

== Critical reception ==
Professional ratings
Review scores
Source	Rating
AllMusic	2/5 stars
The Rolling Stone Album Guide	2/5 stars

The New York Times wrote that "King good-naturedly dishes out humanitarian truisms like chicken soup." The Globe and Mail noted that "the band of folk-jazz musicians she has assembled around her is Nashville and California perfect," but deemed the album a "likeable, although undistinguished collection of songs."

== Track listing ==
All songs by Carole King unless otherwise noted.

1. "One to One" (King, Cynthia Weil) – 3:16
2. "It's a War" – 3:08
3. "Lookin' Out for Number One" – 3:15
4. "Life Without Love" (Gerry Goffin, Louise Goffin, Warren Pash) – 3:48
5. "Golden Man" – 5:24
6. "Read Between the Lines" – 2:54
7. "(Love Is Like A) Boomerang" – 2:35
8. "Goat Annie" – 4:01
9. "Someone You Never Met Before" (Goffin, King) – 3:16
10. "Little Prince" – 2:06

== Personnel ==
Musicians and vocalists

- Carole King – lead vocals, backing vocals (1, 2, 4), grand piano (1, 2, 4–7, 9, 10), Wurlitzer electric piano (2), Fender Rhodes (10)
- Reese Wynans – grand piano (1, 3, 8), Fender Rhodes (1, 4–7), organ (2, 9), synthesizers (4)
- Robert McEntee – acoustic guitar (1, 5), electric guitar (2–5, 7, 8), backing vocals (2, 3, 5), first guitar solo (5), slide guitar (8)
- Eric Johnson – electric guitar (1, 3–5, 7), second guitar solo (5), Fender Rhodes (7)
- Danny Kortchmar – electric guitar solo (2), electric guitar (9)
- Charles Larkey – bass
- Steve Meador – drums (1–9)
- Christopher Dennis – percussion (1–5, 7), tambourine (6), goat bell (8)
- Richard Hardy – flutes (5), alto saxophone (7)
- Mark Hallman – backing vocals (1–6), acoustic guitar (8)
- Debbie James – backing vocals (5)
- Louise Goffin – backing vocals (6, 9)
- Sherry Goffin – backing vocals (6)

Horns (Tracks 2 & 3)

- George Bohanon – horn arrangements
- John Mills – baritone saxophone
- Richard Hardy – tenor saxophone
- Donald Knaub – bass trombone
- Michael Mordecai – trombone
- Raymond Crisara – trumpet
- Scott McIntosh – trumpet

String on "Little Prince"

- Bill Ginn and Mark Hallman – string arrangements
- Leonard Posner – concertmaster
- Ted Herring and Delta Holl – cello
- Sallie Banks, Shirley Blair, Stepen Edwards and Lucia Woodroff – viola
- Michael Fizzell, Marylynn Fletcher, Dorothy Goodenough, Georgeann Nero, Nancy Nicoles, Leonard Posner, Douglas Tabony and Betty Whitlock – violin

Production

- Carole King – producer
- Mark Hallman – producer
- Chet Himes – engineer
- James Tuttle – additional engineer, assistant engineer
- Tom Cummings – remixing (4), assistant engineer (10)
- Bobby Hata – mastering at Amigo Studios (Burbank, California)
- Gayle Goff – production coordinator
- Dick Reeves – art direction, design
- John Wilson – art direction, design, illustration
- Bill Maye – art direction and design assistance
- Jim "Señor" McGuire – photography
- Michael Brovsky and Witt Stewart – direction, management

== LP Chart position ==
Year	Chart	Position
1982	Billboard Pop albums	119

The album's lead single, "One to One", peaked at No. 45 on Billboard's Hot 100 in 1982.
