= Simple Things (Carole King album) =

Studio album by Carole King
- Released: July 1977
- Studio: A&M (Hollywood); Sound Labs (Los Angeles)
- Genre: Pop; rock
- Length: 40:45
- Label: Avatar / Capitol
- Producer: Carole King, Norm Kinney

Carole King chronology
Thoroughbred (1976)	Simple Things (1977)	Welcome Home (1978)

Simple Things is the 8th album by American singer-songwriter Carole King, released in 1977. It is her first album on the Avatar / Capitol label.

== Critical reception ==
Professional ratings
Review scores
Source	Rating
AllMusic	2/5 stars
Christgau's Record Guide	C−
The Rolling Stone Album Guide	2/5 stars

Cash Box said of the title song that it "lives up to the philosophy of its title and lyric" and "has a deceptively simple melody that draws the listener in after a few short seconds."

== Track listing ==
All tracks written by Carole King, except as noted below.

Side one

1. "Simple Things" (King, Rick Evers) – 2:41
2. "Hold On" (King, Evers) – 4:37
3. "In the Name of Love" – 3:04
4. "Labyrinth" – 4:03
5. "You're the One Who Knows" – 5:05

Side two

1. "Hard Rock Cafe" – 3:44
2. "Time Alone" – 2:37
3. "God Only Knows" – 6:19
4. "To Know That I Love You" (King, Evers) – 3:31
5. "One" – 5:04

== Personnel ==
- Carole King – piano, vocals, background vocals
- Rick Evers – guitar
- Robert McEntee – guitar, keyboards, background vocals
- Michael Rivera – percussion
- Rob Galloway – bass
- Mark Hallman – guitar, keyboards, background vocals
- Michael Wooten – drums
- Louise Goffin – background vocals
- Sherry Goffin – background vocals
- Nolan Smith – trumpet, flugelhorn
- Maurice Spears – bass trombone
- Terry Harrington – baritone saxophone
- Oscar Brashear – trumpet, flugelhorn
- Ernie Watts – tenor saxophone
- George Bohanon – trombone, horn arrangement
- Robert Dubow – violin
- Charles Veal – violin
- Ken Yerke – violin
- David Campbell – viola
- Dennis Karmazyn – cello

Production notes

- Produced by Carole King and Norm Kinney
- Engineered by Norm Kinney and Milt Calice
- Steve Katz – assistant engineer
- James Tuttle – sound assistance
- Bernie Grundman – mastering
- Roy Reynolds – illustrations and photography
- Rick Evers – label design
- Terry Kruger – label art
- Roy Kohara and Roy Reynolds – art direction

== Charts ==
=== Weekly charts ===
Chart (1977)	Position
Australia (Kent Music Report)	19
Canadian RPM Albums Chart	27
United States Billboard Pop Albums	17

=== Year-end charts ===
Chart (1977)	Position
Australian Albums Chart	88

== Certifications ==
Region	Certification
United States (RIAA)	Gold
