= Jazzman =

1974 song by Carole King

Single by Carole King

from the album Wrap Around Joy
- B-side: "You Go Your Way, I'll Go Mine"
- Released: August 22, 1974
- Recorded: 1974
- Studio: A&M (Hollywood)
- Genre: Pop; jazz
- Length: 3:44
- Label: Ode
- Songwriters: Carole King, David Palmer
- Producer: Lou Adler

Carole King singles chronology
"Corazon" (1973)	"Jazzman" (1974)	"Nightingale" (1975)

"Jazzman" is a 1974 song performed by Carole King, from her album Wrap Around Joy. King composed the music for the song, while David Palmer (formerly of Steely Dan) wrote the lyrics.

The song is best known for its lengthy saxophone solos, performed by Tom Scott, while King sings an ode to 'the Jazzman' and the effect he has on her. Curtis Amy, saxophonist, composer, and former musical director for the Ray Charles band, was the 'jazz man' of the song.

Released in August, the song peaked at #2 on the Billboard Hot 100 chart the week of November 9, 1974 (stuck behind "You Ain't Seen Nothing Yet" by Bachman Turner Overdrive). That same week, it was #1 on the Cash Box Top 100 chart. In King's hometown of New York, "Jazzman" hit No. 1 on the WABC Musicradio 77 Survey for the week of November 12. The song also reached No. 4 on the Billboard Adult Contemporary chart.

"Jazzman" is also prominently featured in The Simpsons episode "'Round Springfield", sung by Yeardley Smith as Lisa Simpson; it is presented as a duet between Lisa and the ghost of recurring character Bleeding Gums Murphy, who plays the saxophone.

== Reception ==
Billboard described "Jazzman" as one of King's most commercial songs, and praised the saxophone playing and backup vocals. Cash Box said that "the artist's unique vocal is powerfully backed by strong horns and a great pop arrangement." Record World said that its King's "most animated single...since 'I Feel the Earth Move'" and "features the fine sax solos of Tom Scott, along with her own strong overdubbing."

"Jazzman" was nominated for a Grammy Award in 1975 in the category Best Female Pop Vocal Performance, losing out to Olivia Newton-John's song "I Honestly Love You".

== Charts ==
=== Weekly charts ===
Chart (1974)	Peak position
Canada Top Singles (RPM)	2
Canada Adult Contemporary (RPM)	1
US Billboard Hot 100	2
US Adult Contemporary (Billboard)	4
US Cash Box Top 100	1

=== Year-end charts ===
Chart (1974)	Rank
Canada RPM Top Singles	33
US (Joel Whitburn's Pop Annual)	42

== See also ==
- 1974 in music
