= Sweet Seasons =

Single by Carole King

from the album Music
- B-side: "Pocket Money"
- Released: January 1972
- Genre: Folk rock, soft rock, blue-eyed soul
- Length: 3:14
- Label: Ode Records; A&M Records; Sony/BMG
- Songwriters: Toni Stern, Carole King
- Producer: Lou Adler

Carole King singles chronology
"So Far Away" (1971)	"Sweet Seasons" (1972)	"Been to Canaan" (1972)

“Sweet Seasons” is a song written by Carole King and Toni Stern which appeared on King's 1971 album Music. It was the only charting single from the album, and was her second of four Top 10 hits in the US.

== Background ==
E! News reporter Josh Grossberg described it as one of King's biggest hits. Cash Box described it as a "piano pumper-thumper" that is "bright and breezy." Record World called it a "worthy choice" as the first single from Music.

Musicologist James Perone describes Stern's lyrics as being less personal than the lyrics Stern and King wrote for songs on King's earlier album Tapestry. However, there is one line which Perone does regard as personal, when King sings about having kids and building a life in the country. Perone feels that this line refers to King's daughters and her move to Idaho. According to New Jersey Star-Ledger reporter Tris McCall, the lyrics portray the singer in a manner that King often portrays her songs' protagonists, as 'sharp-witted and adorable, but also diffident and reflexively self-deferential'.

Perone describes the song as 'Top 40, pop-oriented' but also hears elements in the arrangement that anticipate Steely Dan's sound as well as Rickie Lee Jones' horn arrangement in "Chuck E.'s in Love". Perone rates the song as 'an ideal AM radio, top-40 pop song... that stands up as well as any of Carole King's hit compositions'. But Tim Crouse of Rolling Stone describes the song as a disappointing throwaway. Actress Jessie Mueller, who portrayed King in the Broadway musical Beautiful: The Carole King Musical, regards "Sweet Seasons" as one of her favorite King songs.

== Personnel ==
Credits adapted from The Words and Music of Carole King.

- Carole King – vocals, piano
- Curtis Amy – tenor saxophone
- Oscar Brashear – flugelhorn
- Bobbye Hall – bongos, congas
- Danny Kortchmar – electric guitar
- Charles Larkey – bass guitar
- Joel O'Brien – drums
- Ralph Schuckett – Hammond organ

== Chart performance ==
"Sweet Seasons" reached No. 9 in the United States and No. 12 in Canada. It was also an Adult Contemporary hit in both nations, reaching numbers 2 and 21, respectively. The song was also popular in Germany, particularly among younger people.

=== Weekly charts ===
Chart (1972)	Peak position
Australia Go-Set	19
Australia KMR	23
Canada RPM 100 Singles	12
Canada Adult Contemporary	21
U.S. Adult Contemporary	2
U.S. Billboard Hot 100	9
U.S. Cash Box Top 100	8

=== Year-end charts ===
Chart (1972)	Rank
Australia KMR	162
U.S. (Joel Whitburn's Pop Annual)	94
U.S. Cash Box	84

== Covers ==
"Sweet Seasons" has been covered by several musicians, including The Isley Brothers (1972), Frances Yip (1973) and Micky Dolenz (2010).
