= Wrap Around Joy =

Studio album by Carole King
- Released: September 1974
- Genres: Pop; soft rock
- Length: 42:06
- Labels: Ode / A&M (original issue); Ode / Epic (re-issue)
- Producer: Lou Adler

Carole King chronology
Fantasy (1973)	Wrap Around Joy (1974)	Really Rosie (1975)

Singles from Wrap Around Joy
- 1. "Jazzman" Released: August 22, 1974; 2. "Nightingale" Released: December 17, 1974

Professional ratings
Review scores
Source	Rating
AllMusic	3/5 stars
Christgau's Record Guide	C
Rolling Stone	(mixed)

Wrap Around Joy is the sixth album by American singer and songwriter Carole King, released in 1974. The album peaked at number one on the Billboard 200 albums chart in late 1974 and spun off successful singles with "Jazzman", which reached number two on the Billboard Hot 100 chart and earned King a nomination for Best Pop Vocal Performance, Female in the 17th Grammy Awards (the award went to Olivia Newton-John for "I Honestly Love You"); and "Nightingale", which reached number nine on the Hot 100 chart and number six on the Easy Listening chart.

The album was certified Gold by the RIAA.

== Track listing ==
All tracks are written by Carole King and David Palmer.

Side one
No.	Title	Length
1.	"Nightingale"	3:36
2.	"Change in Mind, Change of Heart"	4:39
3.	"Jazzman"	3:43
4.	"You Go Your Way, I'll Go Mine"	3:32
5.	"You're Something New"	2:53
6.	"We Are All in This Together"	4:02

Side two
No.	Title	Length
1.	"Wrap Around Joy"	2:56
2.	"You Gentle Me"	3:46
3.	"My Lovin' Eyes"	3:06
4.	"Sweet Adonis"	3:21
5.	"A Night This Side of Dying"	2:57
6.	"The Best Is Yet to Come"	3:30
Total length:		42:06

== Personnel ==
- Carole King – piano, vocals, backing vocals
- Charles Larkey – bass
- Andy Newmark – drums
- Dean Parks – guitar
- Danny Kortchmar – guitar
- Horn section:
  - George Bohanon
  - Fred Jackson, Jr.
  - Mike Altschul
  - Chuck Findley
  - Gene Coe
  - Dick "Slyde" Hyde
  - Ernie Watts
- Tom Scott – saxophone solo on "Jazzman"
- Jim Horn – saxophone solo on "Wrap Around Joy"
- Abigale Haness – backing vocals
- Sherry and Louise Goffin – backing vocals on "Nightingale"
- The Eddie Kendricks Singers – choir vocals on "We Are All in This Together"
- The David Campbell String Section – strings on "We Are All in This Together"

== Charts ==
=== Weekly charts ===
Chart (1974)	Position
Australia (Kent Music Report)	24
Canadian RPM Albums Chart	1
Japanese Oricon LPs Chart	7
US Billboard Top LPs	1

=== Year-end charts ===
Chart (1974)	Position
Canadian Albums Chart	13
Chart (1975)	Position
US Billboard Year-End	73

== Certifications ==
Region	Certification
United States (RIAA)	Gold
