= Only Love Is Real =

Single by Carole King

from the album Thoroughbred
- B-side: "Still Here Thinking of You"
- Released: February 1976
- Genre: Easy listening
- Length: 3:29
- Label: Ode
- Songwriter: Carole King
- Producer: Lou Adler

Carole King singles chronology
"Nightingale" (1975)	"Only Love Is Real" (1976)	"High Out of Time" (1976)

"Only Love Is Real" is a song written and performed by Carole King. The song was included on her 1976 album, Thoroughbred. The single peaked at No. 28 in the Billboard Hot 100 and was King's fourth and final No. 1 on the Easy Listening chart, where it remained for one week in March 1976. It is ranked as the 40th biggest AC/Easy Listening hit of 1976.

Cash Box said the song has a "likable tune with a carefully constructed lyric" and that "Like Dylan, Carole King understands the power of a subtle rhyme, and she uses her knowledge in this tune with tremendous effect." Record World said that "The exceptional songwriting prowess of Carole King continues to manifest itself in quality records such as this."

== Personnel ==
- Carole King – synthesizer, piano, vocals, background vocals
- Waddy Wachtel – guitar
- Danny "Kootch" Kortchmar – guitar
- Russ Kunkel – drums
- Leland Sklar – bass
- Tom Scott – saxophone
- Ralph MacDonald - percussion
- David Crosby - background vocal
- Graham Nash - background vocal
- John David Souther - background vocal

== Charts ==
Chart (1976)	Peak position
US Billboard Hot 100	28
US Billboard Easy Listening	1

== See also ==
- List of Billboard Easy Listening number ones of 1976
