= A Natural Woman (memoir) =

2012 memoir by Carole King

A Natural Woman: A Memoir
- Author: Carole King
- Language: English
- Genre: Memoir
- Publisher: Grand Central Publishing
- Publication date: April 10, 2012
- Pages: 484
- ISBN: 978-1-4555-1261-4

A Natural Woman: A Memoir is a 2012 memoir by musician Carole King.

== Publication ==
The 484-page book was published by Grand Central on April 10, 2012.

== Content ==
A Natural Woman spans King's career from musical beginnings in early childhood and the recording contract she signed as a teenager in the 1950s, through a career spanning more than six more decades. Writing in The Guardian, Caroline Sullivan describes the memoir as focused more on King's personal life and musical production than the fame that ensued:

"[W]hat she pours her heart into are lengthy descriptions of home life with her husbands (there have been four) and four kids...Though she writes in detail about the making of Tapestry, she barely mentions its subsequent success. It's an odd omission. Any record that spent a full six years in the Billboard chart is, at the least, a small cultural phenomenon. It must have been life-changing, yet she skims over what it felt like suddenly to be America's biggest-selling singer. There are three brief sentences about winning four Grammys in 1972 (she didn't attend the ceremony 'because it was in New York and I wanted to stay in California with my family'), and a bit more about how she coped with fame: 'I just wanted to do what I'd been doing as a wife and mother before the success of Tapestry. I made clothes for everyone in the family, tended our small garden and occasionally went out for sushi lunch in Little Tokyo...'"

At the same time that the book dwells more on these private details rather than her public life, Helen Brown, writing in The Telegraph, found King's text "gently protective of the fascinating, but often destructive, people in King's life...Relentlessly empathetic, King hasn’t a bad word to say about anybody," even when describing marriages affected by a husband's drug use, mental illness, infidelity or domestic violence. Several reviewers remarked on this characteristic of the book: Sullivan found A Natural Woman described "someone, you fancy, who would remember your birthday and return your calls" and notes this kindness and conscientiousness reflected in the book's prose: "And she writes that way, constructing sentences correctly, telling anecdotes with scrupulous attention to detail (avoiding drugs in the 60s had its benefits – she can actually remember the decade) and fretting maternally about family and friends." In Vanity Fair, Bruce Handy noted the consonance of the memoir's warm tenor with the same in King's music: "King is the woman who wrote the lyric: 'You got to get up every morning/With a smile on your face/And show the world/All the love in your heart.' And that is very much the woman who wrote her memoir."

== Reception ==
A Natural Woman received predominantly favorable reviews. In The Independent, Liz Thomson wrote: "what a memoir: intelligent, honest, self-effacing, well-written". Handy argued that King's "characteristic generosity of spirit" marks the book "for good and ill...Spite is a horrible emotion, but memoir-writing might be the one activity where it comes in handy, at least from a readers' point of view." However, in The Los Angeles Times, Evelyn McDonnell found King's memoir, if "sometimes, determinedly unglamorous", "far more original" than "the usual celebrity story of hardship, riches, overindulgence, downfall and rehab". Brown's Telegraph review gave the book three of five stars.
