= Speeding Time =

Studio album by Carole King
- Released: November 11, 1983
- Studios: Amigo (North Hollywood, California)
- Genre: New wave
- Length: 38:19
- Label: Atlantic
- Producer: Lou Adler

Carole King chronology
One to One (1982)	Speeding Time (1983)	City Streets (1989)

Professional ratings
Review scores
Source	Rating
AllMusic	2/5 stars

Speeding Time is the thirteenth studio album by American singer-songwriter Carole King, released in 1983. King's 13th album in fourteen years, Speeding Time featured a prominent new wave sound that was negatively reviewed by critics used to King's more traditional pop stylings. The album became her first record not to chart at all; King did not record again for six years.

== Production ==
King cowrote four of the album's songs with her former husband and longtime collaborator Gerry Goffin. The album's sound was inspired by King's admiration for Thomas Dolby's "She Blinded Me with Science".

== Track listing ==
Side 1

1. "Computer Eyes" (King, Gerry Goffin) – (3:08)
2. "One Small Voice" (King) – (3:01)
3. "Crying in the Rain" (King, Howard Greenfield) – (2:32)
4. "Sacred Heart of Stone" (King, Goffin) – (3:45)
5. "Speeding Time" (King, Goffin) – (4:49)

Side 2

1. "Standin' on the Borderline" (King, Goffin) – (2:55)
2. "So Ready for Love" (King) – (5:22)
3. "Chalice Borealis" (King, Rick Sorensen) – (2:35)
4. "Dancing" (King) – (4:00)
5. "Alabaster Lady" (King) – (5:45)

== Personnel ==
- Carole King – lead vocals, backing vocals, acoustic piano, synthesizers
- Robbie Kondor – synthesizers, synthesizer programming (2, 3, 5–7, 9, 10), synth harmonica solo (7)
- Rob Meurer – synthesizer, programming (1, 4, 8)
- Danny Kortchmar – guitars
- Lee Ritenour – guitars
- Bob Glaub – bass
- Steve Meador – drums (1, 4)
- Russ Kunkel – drums (2, 3, 5–10)
- Bobbye Hall – percussion
- Plas Johnson – tenor saxophone solo (3)
- Sherry Goffin Kondor – counter lead vocals (9)

Production

- Lou Adler – producer
- Paul Brown – engineer, mixing, recording
- Chet Hines – recording
- Bobby Hata – mastering at Amigo Studios
- Peter Corriston – album design
- Jim Shea – cover photography
- Brian Hagiwara – design photography
