= Carole King =

American singer-songwriter and pianist (born 1942)

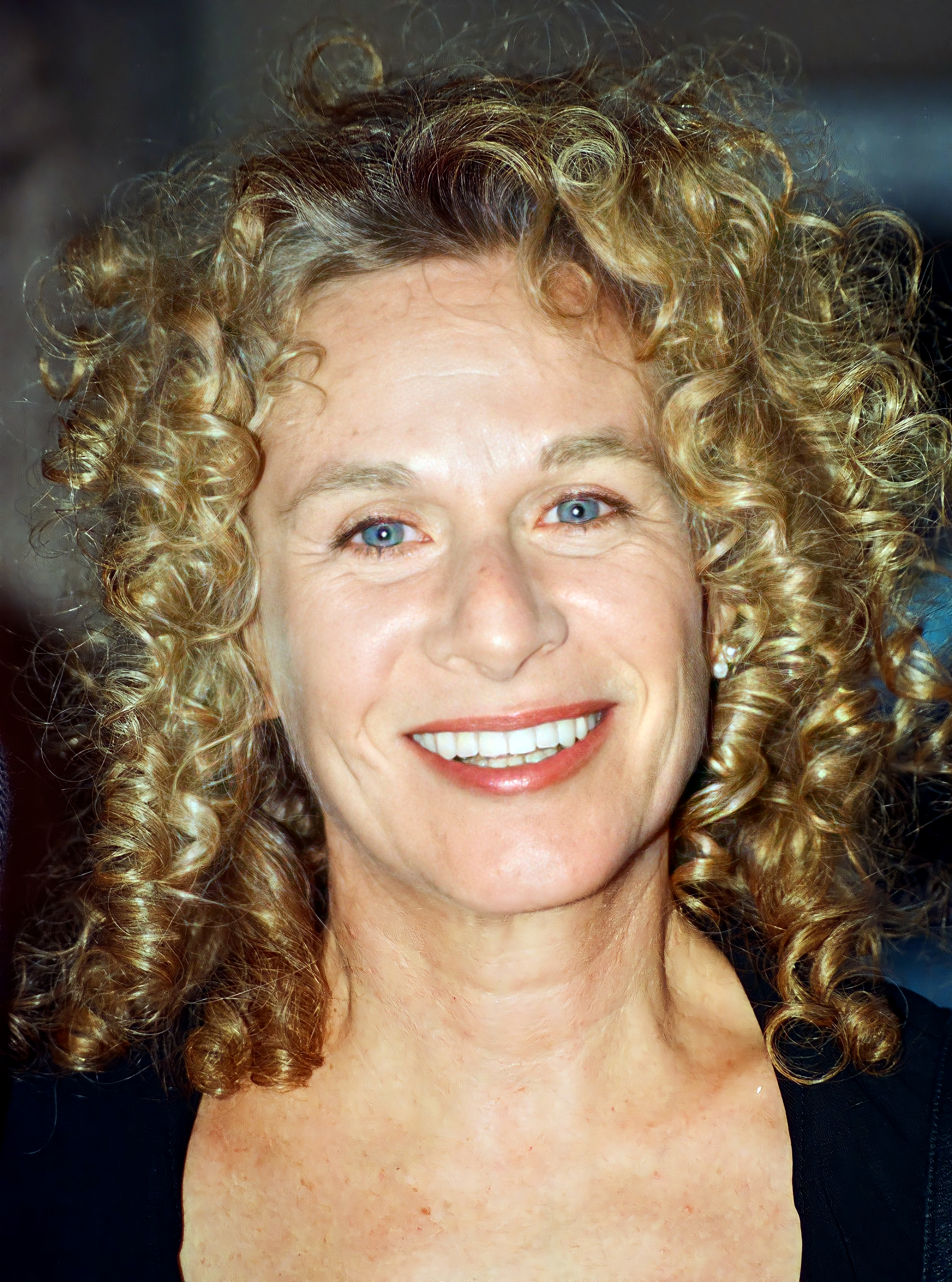
- King in 2002
- Born: Carol Joan Klein; February 9, 1942 (age 84); New York City, U.S.
- Occupations: Singer; songwriter; musician
- Years active: 1958–present
- Spouses: Gerry Goffin (m. 1959; div. 1968) Charles Larkey (m. 1970; div. 1976) Rick Evers (m. 1977; died 1978) Rick Sorenson (m. 1982; div. 1989)
- Children: 4, including Louise Goffin and Molly Larkey
- Musical career
- Genres: Pop; folk rock; pop rock; soft rock; Brill Building; blue-eyed soul
- Instruments: Vocals; piano
- Works: Carole King discography
- Labels: Rockingale; Ode/Epic/CBS; A&M Records; Koch Records; Priority/EMI; RCA
- Formerly of: The City
- Website: caroleking.com

Carole King Klein (born Carol Joan Klein; February 9, 1942) is an American singer-songwriter and musician renowned for her extensive contributions to popular music. She wrote or co-wrote 118 songs that charted on the Billboard Hot 100 during the latter half of the 20th century and 61 songs that reached the UK charts, establishing her as the most successful female songwriter on the UK singles charts from 1962 to 2005.

In the 1960s, King and her first husband, Gerry Goffin, composed over two dozen hit songs for various artists, many of which remain standards. She transitioned to a solo performing career in the 1970s, following her debut album Writer (1970) with the critically acclaimed Tapestry (1971), which topped the U.S. album chart for 15 weeks and stayed on the charts for over six years.

King has released 25 solo albums, with Tapestry being her most successful, and has sold over 75 million records worldwide. Her honors include four Grammy Awards, inductions into the Songwriters Hall of Fame and twice into the Rock and Roll Hall of Fame (as a performer and songwriter), the 2013 Library of Congress Gershwin Prize for Popular Song (as its first female recipient), and the 2015 Kennedy Center Honors.

== Early life and education ==
Born Carol Joan Klein on February 9, 1942, in Manhattan, New York City, to Jewish parents Eugenia (née Cammer), a teacher, and Sidney N. Klein, a firefighter.

King's parents met in an elevator in 1936 at Brooklyn College, where her father was a chemistry major and her mother was an English and drama major. They married in 1937 during the last years of the Great Depression. King's mother dropped out of college to run the household; her father also quit college and briefly took a job as a radio announcer. With the economy struggling, he then took a more secure job as a firefighter. After King was born, her parents settled in Brooklyn and were eventually able to buy a small two-story duplex where they could rent out the upstairs for income.

King's mother had learned to play piano as a child and would sometimes practice after buying a piano. When King developed an insatiable curiosity about music at the age of three, her mother began teaching her basic piano skills without giving her actual lessons. When King was four, her parents discovered she had absolute pitch, which enabled her to name a note correctly just by hearing it. King's father enjoyed showing off his daughter's skill to visiting friends: "My dad's smile was so broad that it encompassed the lower half of his face. I enjoyed making my father happy and getting the notes right."

King's mother began giving her real music lessons when she was four with King climbing the stool, made higher still by a phone book. With her mother sitting beside her, King learned music theory and elementary piano technique, including how to read notation and execute proper note timing. King wanted to learn as much as possible: "My mother never forced me to practice. She didn't have to. I wanted so much to master the popular songs that poured out of the radio."

King began kindergarten when she was four, and after her first year, she was promoted directly to second grade, showing an exceptional facility with words and numbers. In the 1950s, she attended James Madison High School in the Midwood section of Brooklyn. She formed a band called the Co-Sines, changed her name from Carol Klein to Carole King, and made demo records with her friend Paul Simon for $25 a session. Her first official recording was the promotional single "The Right Girl", released by ABC-Paramount in 1958, which she wrote and sang to an arrangement by Don Costa.

King attended Queens College, where she met Gerry Goffin, who was to become her songwriting partner. When she was 17, they married in a Jewish ceremony on Long Island in August 1959 after King became pregnant with her first daughter, Louise. They quit college and took day jobs, Goffin working as an assistant chemist and King as a secretary. They wrote songs together in the evening.

== Career ==
In 1959, "Oh! Carol" became a top-10 hit for her ex-boyfriend from high school, Neil Sedaka, who had named the song after her. The success of the record convinced her that pursuing a songwriting career would be a viable career path for her as well, and with Sedaka's endorsement, King and Goffin joined the staff at Aldon Music. Goffin took the tune and wrote the playful answer song, "Oh! Neil", which King recorded and released as a single the same year. The B-side contained the Goffin-King song "A Very Special Boy". The single was not a success. After writing the Shirelles' 1960 Billboard No. 1 hit, "Will You Love Me Tomorrow" —the first No. 1 by a black girl group—Goffin and King gave up their daytime jobs to concentrate on writing. "Will You Love Me Tomorrow" became a pop standard.

=== 1960s ===
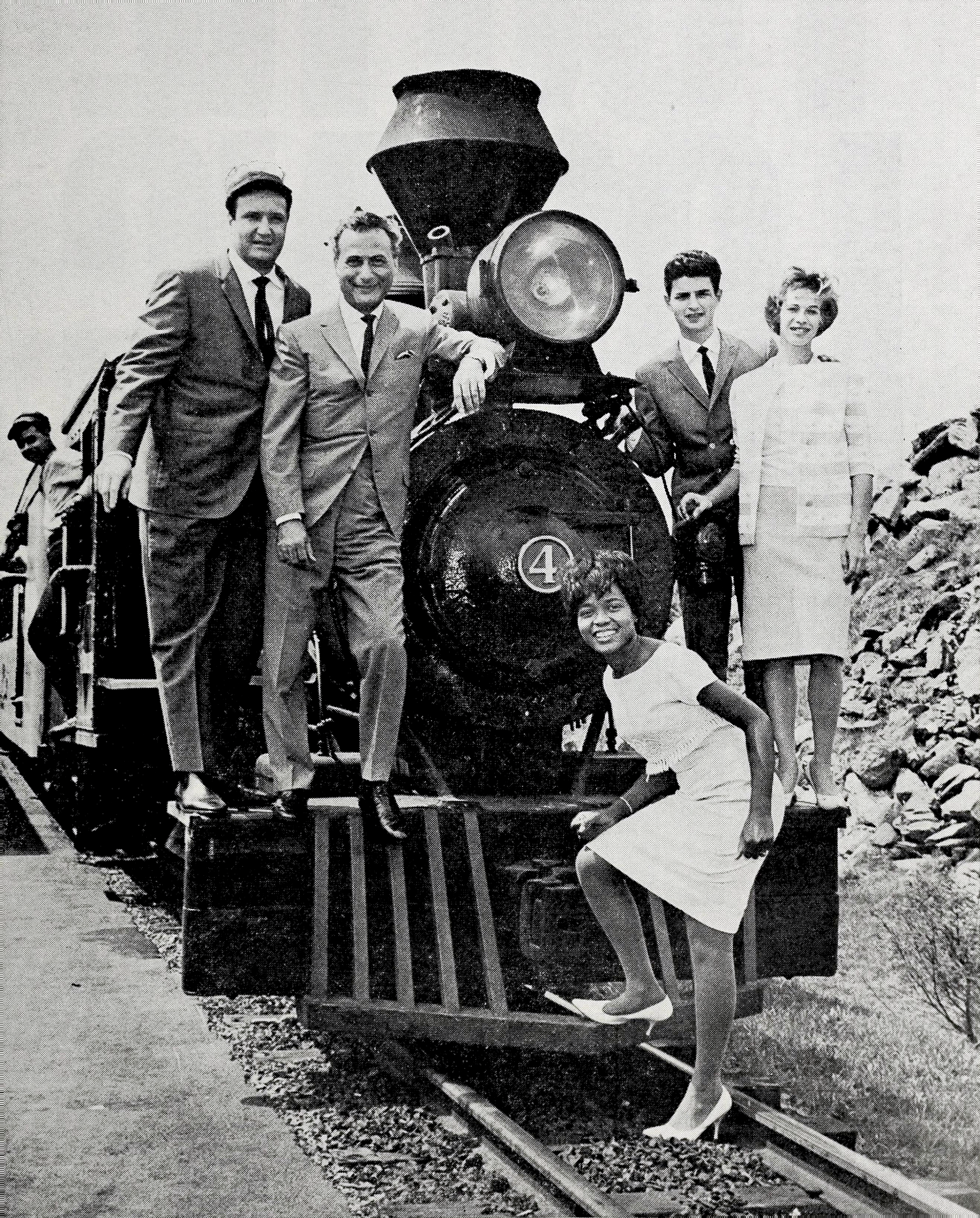
King, Gerry Goffin and Little Eva on the cover of Cash Box; September 15, 1962

In the 1960s, with King composing the music and Goffin writing the lyrics, the two wrote a string of classic songs for a variety of artists. King and Goffin were also the songwriting team behind Don Kirshner's Dimension Records, which produced songs including "Chains" (later recorded by the Everly Brothers and the Beatles), "The Loco-Motion", "Keep Your Hands off My Baby" (both for their babysitter Little Eva), and "It Might as Well Rain Until September" which King recorded herself in 1962—her first success, which charted at 22 in the US and 3 in the UK (where it was her all-time greatest hit). King recorded a few follow-up singles in the wake of "September", with none charting particularly well. By 1966, her already sporadic recording career was entirely abandoned – albeit temporarily.

Other songs of King's early period (through 1967) include "Crying in the Rain" peaking at number six on the US Billboard Hot 100 in February 1962 for the Everly Brothers, "Half Way To Paradise" for Tony Orlando (recorded by Billy Fury in the UK), "Take Good Care of My Baby" for Bobby Vee, "Up on the Roof" for the Drifters, "I'm into Something Good" for Earl-Jean (later recorded by Herman's Hermits), "One Fine Day" for the Chiffons, and "Pleasant Valley Sunday" for the Monkees (inspired by their move to suburban West Orange, New Jersey), and the classic "(You Make Me Feel Like) A Natural Woman" for Aretha Franklin. The duo wrote several songs recorded by Dusty Springfield, including "Goin' Back" and "Some of Your Lovin'". They wrote at 1650 Broadway, alongside other songwriters associated with the Brill Building Sound.

By 1968, Goffin and King were divorced and not keeping in contact. King moved to Laurel Canyon, Los Angeles, with her two daughters, and reactivated her recording career by forming "The City", a music trio consisting of bassist Charles Larkey (her future husband) and Danny Kortchmar on guitar and vocals, with King herself on piano and vocals. The City produced one album, Now That Everything's Been Said (1968), but King's reluctance to perform live meant promotion and sales were limited. A change of distributors meant that the album was quickly deleted, and the group disbanded in 1969. The album was rediscovered by classic rock radio in the early 1980s, with the cut "Snow Queen" receiving nominal airplay for a few years. Cleveland's WMMS played it every few weeks between 1981 and 1985, and the long-out-of-print LP became sought after by fans of King who liked the edgy sound of the music.

=== 1970s ===
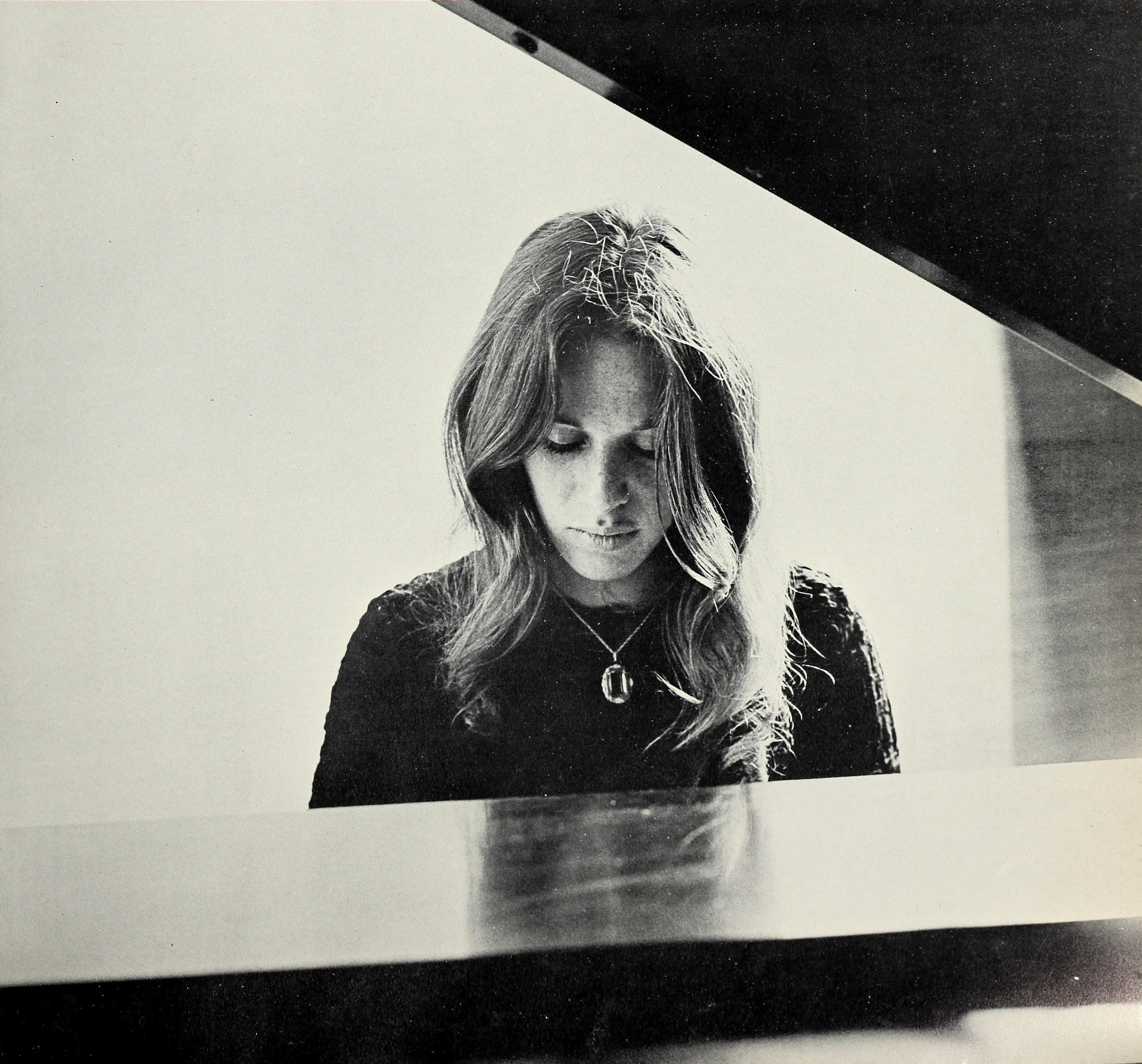
King on the cover of Cash Box; May 15, 1971

While living in Laurel Canyon, King met James Taylor and Joni Mitchell as well as Toni Stern, with whom she collaborated. King released her debut solo album, Writer, in 1970 for Lou Adler's Ode label, with Taylor playing acoustic guitar and providing backing vocals. It peaked at No. 84 on the Billboard Top 200. That same year, King played keyboard on B.B. King's album Indianola Mississippi Seeds.

King followed up Writer with her sophomore effort Tapestry (1971), which featured new songs as well as renewed versions of "Will You Love Me Tomorrow" and "(You Make Me Feel Like) A Natural Woman". The album was recorded concurrently with Taylor's Mud Slide Slim, with an overlapping set of musicians including King, Danny Kortchmar and Joni Mitchell. Both albums included "You've Got a Friend", which was a No. 1 hit for Taylor; King said in a 1972 interview that she "didn't write it with James or anybody really specifically in mind. But when James heard it he really liked it and wanted to record it".

Tapestry was an instant success. With numerous hit singles—including a Billboard No. 1 with "It's Too Late"—Tapestry held the number one spot on the albums chart for 15 consecutive weeks, remained on the chart for nearly six years, and has sold over 30 million copies worldwide. The album garnered four Grammy Awards, including Album of the Year, Best Pop Vocal Performance (Female), Record of the Year ("It's Too Late", lyrics by Toni Stern), and Song of the Year, with King becoming the first woman to win the award (for "You've Got a Friend"). The album appeared on Rolling Stone's 500 Greatest Albums of All Time list at No. 36. In addition, "It's Too Late" was ranked No. 469 on the magazine's list of the 500 Greatest Songs of All Time.

Music was released in December 1971 and subsequently certified gold on December 9. It entered the top ten at No. 8, with Tapestry and Carole King: Music simultaneously occupying the top 10 for many weeks. The following week, Tapestry rose to No. 3 before ascending to the top of the chart on January 1, 1972, staying there for three weeks. The album also spawned a top-ten hit with "Sweet Seasons" (US number 9 and AC number 2). Carole King: Music stayed on the Billboard pop album charts for 44 weeks and was eventually certified platinum.

Rhymes and Reasons (1972) and Fantasy (1973) followed, each record earning gold certifications. Rhymes and Reasons produced another successful single, "Been to Canaan" (US number 24 and AC number one), and Fantasy produced two, "Believe in Humanity" (US number 28) and "Corazon" (US number 37 and AC number 5), as well as another song that charted on the Hot 100, "You Light Up My Life" (US number 67 and AC number 6).

On May 26, 1973, King performed a free concert in New York City's Central Park for at least 100,000 people. The concert was recorded for the film Carole King: Home Again - Live in Central Park.

In September 1974, King released her album Wrap Around Joy, which was certified gold on October 16, 1974, and entered the top ten at No. 7 on October 19, 1974. Two weeks later, it became King's third album to reach No. 1. Wrap Around Joy spawned two singles, "Jazzman" and "Nightingale". "Jazzman" peaked at No. 2 on November 9 but fell out of the top ten the next week; "Nightingale" peaked at No. 9 on March 1, 1975.

In 1975, King scored and recorded songs for the children's animated TV production of Maurice Sendak's Really Rosie, released as an album by the same name, with lyrics by Sendak.

King c. 1977

Thoroughbred (1976) was the last studio album King released under the Ode label. In addition to enlisting long-time friends (such as David Crosby, Graham Nash, James Taylor, and Waddy Wachtel), King reunited with ex Gerry Goffin to write four songs for the album. Their partnership continued intermittently. King also did a promotional tour for the album in 1976.

After covering her song "Goin' Back" on October 17 and 18, 1975, at two of his high-profile Roxy gigs, Bruce Springsteen showed up at the Beacon Theatre in New York City on March 7, 1976, to sing "The Loco-Motion" with King for the night's final encore.

In 1977, King collaborated with another songwriter, Rick Evers, on Simple Things, the first release with a new label distributed by Capitol Records. Shortly after that, King and Evers were married; he died of a cocaine overdose one year later, while King and her daughter, Sherry, were in Hawaii. Simple Things was her first album that failed to reach the top ten on the Billboard since Tapestry, and it was her last gold-certified record by the RIAA, except for a compilation album, Her Greatest Hits (1978), and Live at the Troubadour (2010).

Despite its gold-certified record status, Simple Things was named "The Worst Album of 1977" by Rolling Stone magazine. Neither Welcome Home (1978)—her debut as a co-producer on an album—nor Touch the Sky (1979) entered the Billboard 100. Pearls – The Songs of Goffin and King (1980) yielded a hit single, an updated version of "One Fine Day".

=== 1980s ===
King moved to Atlantic Records for One to One (1982) and Speeding Time in 1983, which was a reunion with Tapestry-era producer Lou Adler. After a well-received concert tour in 1984, journalist Catherine Foster of The Christian Science Monitor dubbed King "a Queen of Rock". She also called King's performance "all spunk and exuberance."

In 1985, she wrote and performed "Care-A-Lot", the theme to The Care Bears Movie, and she wrote and performed "Home Is In Your Heart". Also in 1985, she scored and performed (with David Sanborn) the soundtrack to the Martin Ritt-directed film Murphy's Romance. The soundtrack, again produced by Adler, included the songs "Running Lonely" and "Love For The Last Time (Theme from 'Murphy's Romance')", although a soundtrack album was apparently never officially released. King made a cameo appearance in the film as Tillie, a town hall employee.

In 1988, she starred in the off-Broadway production A Minor Incident. In 1989, she returned to Capitol Records and recorded City Streets, with Eric Clapton on two tracks and Branford Marsalis on one.

=== 1990s ===
Her song "Now and Forever" was in the opening credits to the 1992 film A League of Their Own and was nominated for a Grammy Award. Colour of Your Dreams was released in 1993 and featured an appearance by Slash.

In 1994, she played Mrs. Johnstone on Broadway in Blood Brothers. In 1996, she appeared in Brighton Beach Memoirs in Ireland, directed by Peter Sheridan. That same year, she released the live album The Carnegie Hall Concert: June 18, 1971.

In 1997, King wrote and recorded backing vocals on "The Reason" for Celine Dion on her album Let's Talk About Love. The pair performed a duet on the first VH1 Divas Live benefit concert. King also performed her song "You've Got a Friend" with Dion, Gloria Estefan, and Shania Twain, as well as "(You Make Me Feel Like) A Natural Woman" with Aretha Franklin and others, including Mariah Carey. In 1998, King wrote and performed "Anyone at All" for the film You've Got Mail, starring Tom Hanks and Meg Ryan.

=== 2000s ===
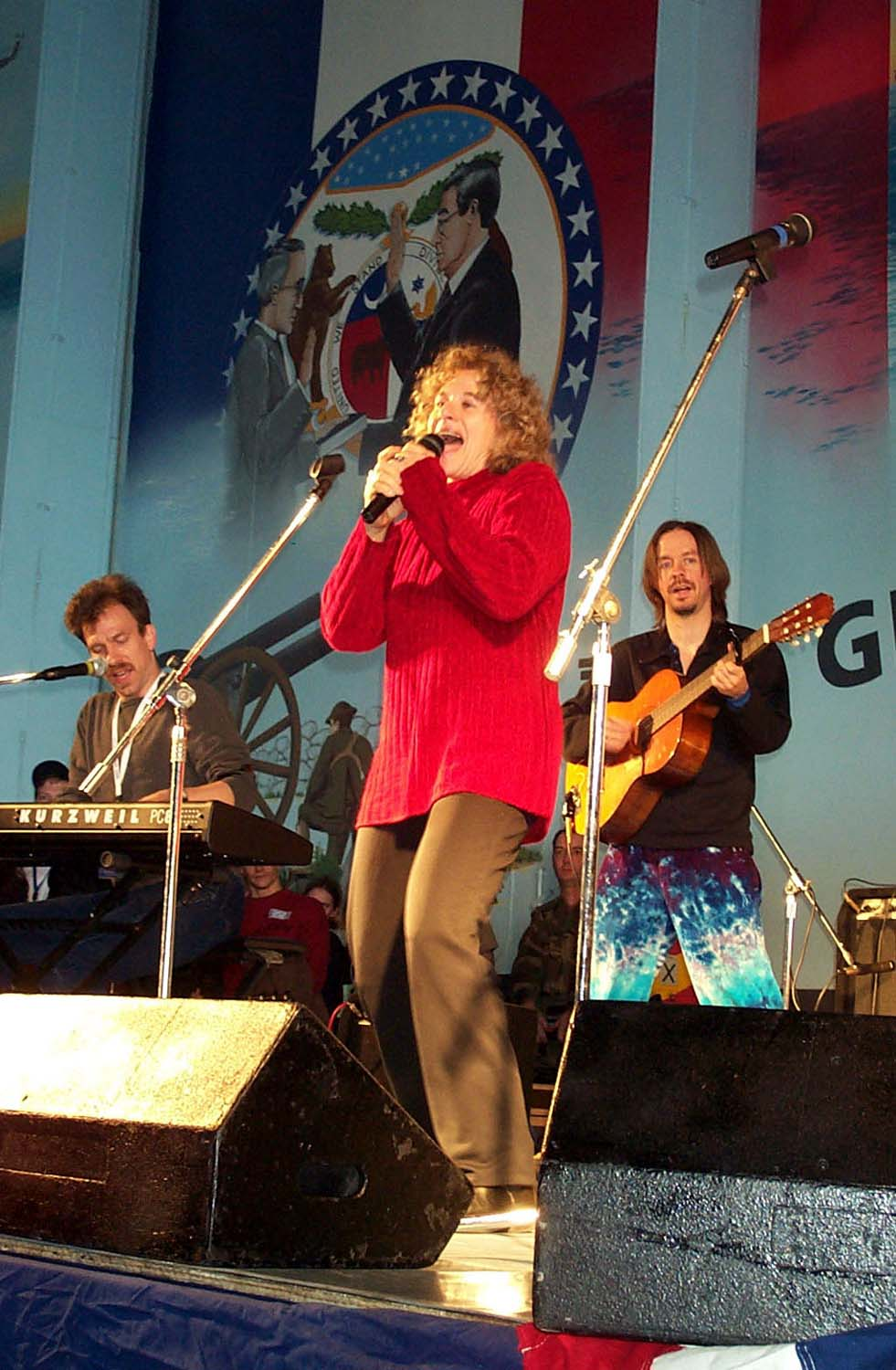
King performing aboard USS Harry S. Truman in the Mediterranean in 2000

In 2000, King was asked to record a version of her hit song "Where You Lead" as the theme song for the show Gilmore Girls. She rewrote a few lyrics to fit the mother-daughter story. She often performs this song with her daughter, Louise Goffin. She rarely performed the song after its original release due to the rise in the women's liberation movement and the falling out of favor of the sentiment behind the lyrics. King agreed to revamp the song to be "something more relevant." The song became strongly associated with female friendships and family members.

In 2001, King appeared in a television ad for the Gap with her daughter. She performed a new song, "Love Makes the World", which became a title track for her studio album in autumn 2001 on her own label, Rockingale, distributed by Koch Records. The album includes songs she wrote for other artists during the mid-1990s and features Celine Dion, Steven Tyler, Babyface, and k.d. lang. Love Makes the World went to 158 in the US and No. 86 in the UK. It also debuted on Billboard′s Top Independent Albums chart and Top Internet Albums chart at No. 20. An expanded edition of the album was issued six years later called Love Makes the World Deluxe Edition. It contains a bonus disc with five additional tracks, including a remake of "Where You Lead (I Will Follow)" co-written with Toni Stern.

The same year, King and Stern wrote "Sayonara Dance", recorded by Yuki, former lead vocalist of the Japanese band Judy and Mary, on her first solo album Prismic the following year. Also in 2001, King composed a song for All About Chemistry album by Semisonic, with the band's frontman Dan Wilson.

King launched her Living Room Tour in July 2004 at the Auditorium Theatre in Chicago. That show, along with shows at the Greek Theater in Los Angeles and the Cape Cod Melody Tent (Hyannis, Massachusetts), were recorded as The Living Room Tour in July 2005. The album sold 44,000 copies in its first week in the US, landing at 17 on the Billboard 200, her highest-charting album since 1977. The album also charted at 51 in Australia. It has sold 330,000 copies in the United States. In August 2006 the album re-entered the Billboard 200 at 151. The tour stopped in Canada, Australia, and New Zealand. A DVD of the tour, Welcome to My Living Room, was released in October 2007.

In November 2007, King toured Japan with Mary J. Blige and Fergie from the Black Eyed Peas. Japanese record labels Sony and Victor reissued most of King's albums, including the works from the late 1970s previously unavailable on compact disc. King recorded a duet of the Goffin/King composition "Time Don't Run Out on Me" with Anne Murray on Murray's 2007 album Anne Murray Duets: Friends and Legends. The song had previously been recorded by Murray for her 1984 album Heart Over Mind.

=== 2010s ===
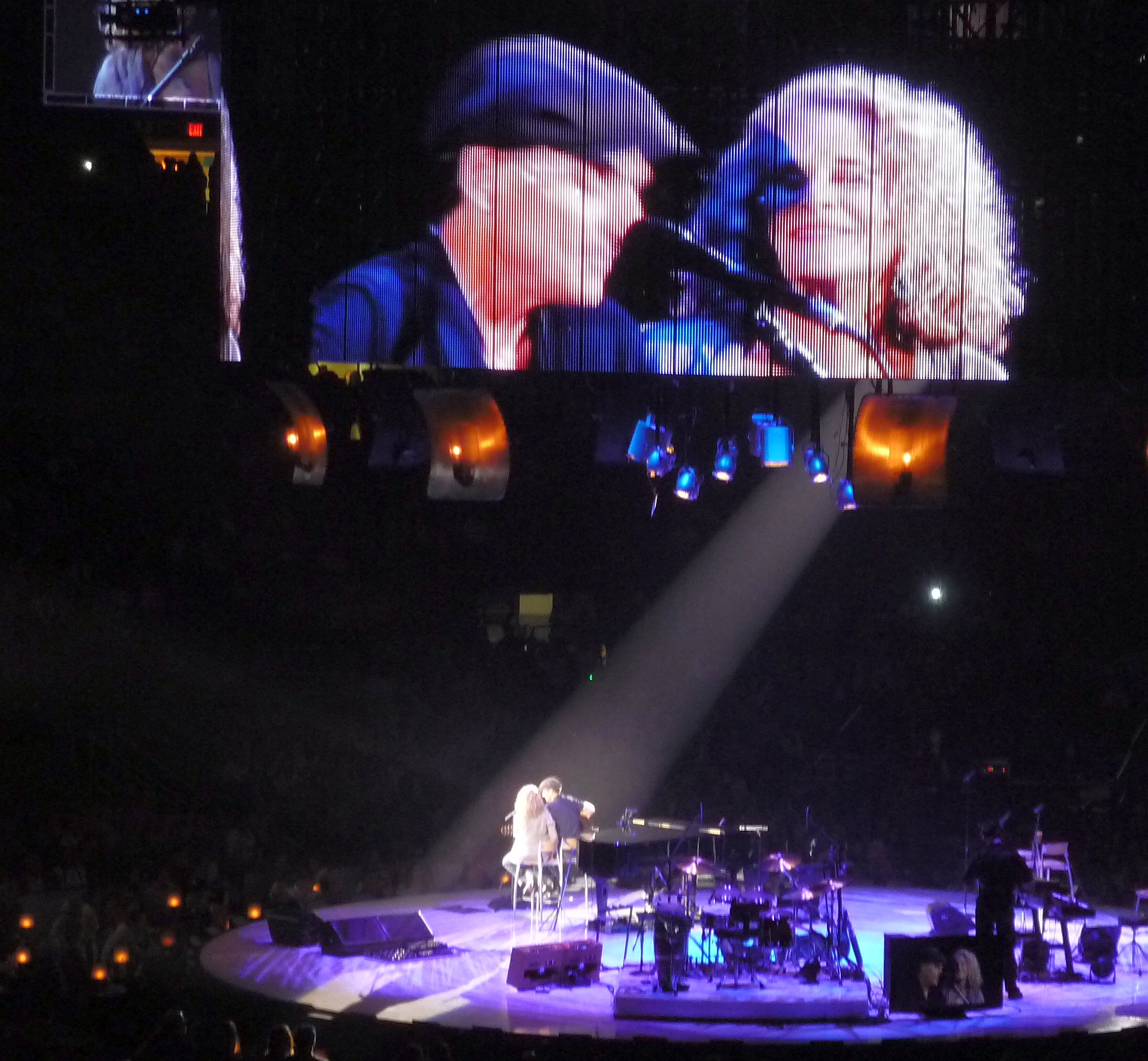
King and James Taylor performing during their 2010 Troubadour Reunion Tour

In 2010 King and James Taylor staged their Troubadour Reunion Tour together, recalling the first time they played at The Troubadour, West Hollywood in 1970. The pair had reunited to mark the club's 50th anniversary two and a half years earlier in 2007 with the band they used in 1970. They enjoyed it so much that they decided to take the band on the road for 2010. The touring band featured players from that original band: Russ Kunkel, Leland Sklar, and Danny Kortchmar. Also present was King's son-in-law, Robbie Kondor and Taylor's three backing singers. King played piano and Taylor guitar on each other's songs, and they together sang some of the numbers they were both associated with. The tour began in Australia in March, returning to the United States in May. It was a major commercial success, with King playing to some of the largest audiences of her career. Total ticket sales exceeded 700,000 and the tour grossed over $59 million, making it one of the most successful tours of the year.

During their Troubadour Reunion Tour, King released two albums, one of new material recorded with Taylor. The first, released in April 2010, The Essential Carole King, was a compilation album of King's work and artists covering her songs. The second album, Live at the Troubadour was released in May 2010, a collaboration between King and Taylor. It debuted at No. 4 in the United States with sales of 78,000 copies. Live at the Troubadour has since received a gold record from the RIAA for shipments of over 500,000 copies in the US and remained on the charts for 34 weeks.

In the fall of 2011, King released A Holiday Carole, an album of Christmas music and new songs written by her daughter Louise Goffin, who co-produced the album. The album received a Grammy nomination for Best Traditional Pop Album.

King's autobiography, A Natural Woman: A Memoir, was published by Grand Central in the United States in April 2012. It entered The New York Times bestseller list at No.6.

In May 2012, King announced her retirement from music. King herself doubted she would ever write another song and said that her 2010 Troubadour Reunion Tour with James Taylor was probably her last tour, saying that it "was a good way to go out." King also said she will most likely not be writing or recording any new music. Later that month, she wrote on her Facebook page that she never said she was actually retiring and stated that she was taking a break.

Early in December 2012, King received a star on the Hollywood Walk of Fame. In 2012 she was given the benefit concert "Painted Turtle – a celebration of Carole King". King also did an Australian tour in February 2013. Following the Boston Marathon bombing, she performed in Boston with James Taylor to help victims of the bombing.

Carole King has been one of the most influential songwriters of our time. For more than five decades, she has written for and been recorded by many different types of artists for a wide range of audiences, communicating with beauty and dignity the universal human emotions of love, joy, pain and loss. Her body of work reflects the spirit of the Gershwin Prize with its originality, longevity and diversity of appeal.

— James H. Billington
Librarian of Congress

In late 2012, the Library of Congress announced that King had been named the 2013 recipient of the Gershwin Prize for Popular Song—the first woman to receive the distinction given to songwriters for a body of work. President Barack Obama and Michelle Obama hosted the award concert at the White House on May 22, 2013, with the President presenting the prize and reading the citation. In May 2013, Carole King received an Honorary Doctorate of Music from Berklee College of Music. In June 2013, she campaigned in Massachusetts for US Representative Ed Markey, the Democratic nominee in a special election for the US Senate to succeed John Kerry, who had resigned to become Secretary of State.

King was honored as MusiCares Person of the Year in January 2014. On December 6, 2015, she was honored as a Kennedy Center Honoree.

In 2016, King was the headline performer at the British Summer Time Festival held in Hyde Park, London, on July 3, 2016, playing all of Tapestry live for the first time. An album of the concert was released in 2017.

In October 2018, King released a new version of her song, "One". In her first new recording since 2011, she was inspired to re-write the lyrics to her song "One" (originally on her 1977 album Simple Things) as "One (2018)" to reflect her dream for America in the 2018 United States elections, as "Love won".

=== Acting roles ===
King has appeared occasionally in acting roles. One of her earliest was in 1975 when she was the speaking and singing voice of the title character in Really Rosie, an animated TV special based on the works of Maurice Sendak. Also in 1975, she appeared (credited under her married name, Carole Larkey) on The Mary Tyler Moore Show in the episode "Anyone Who Hates Kids and Dogs". In 1984, she starred alongside Tatum O'Neal, Hoyt Axton, Alex Karras, and John Lithgow in the Faerie Tale Theatre episode Goldilocks and the Three Bears. She later made three appearances as guest star on the TV series Gilmore Girls as Sophie, the owner of the Stars Hollow music store. King's song "Where You Lead (I Will Follow)" was also the theme song to the series, in a version sung with her daughter Louise. She reprised the role in the 2016 Gilmore Girls Netflix revival, Gilmore Girls: A Year in the Life. King also appeared as Mrs. Johnstone as a replacement in the original Broadway production of Blood Brothers.

== Personal life and family ==
King has been married four times: to Gerry Goffin, Charles Larkey, Rick Evers, and Rick Sorenson. In her 2012 memoir, King wrote that Evers physically abused her on a regular basis. Evers died of a cocaine overdose days after they separated in 1978.

Her children are musicians Louise Goffin and Sherry Goffin Kondor, artist Molly Larkey, and Levi Larkey.

As of November 2018, King lived in Idaho.

== Political and environmental activism ==
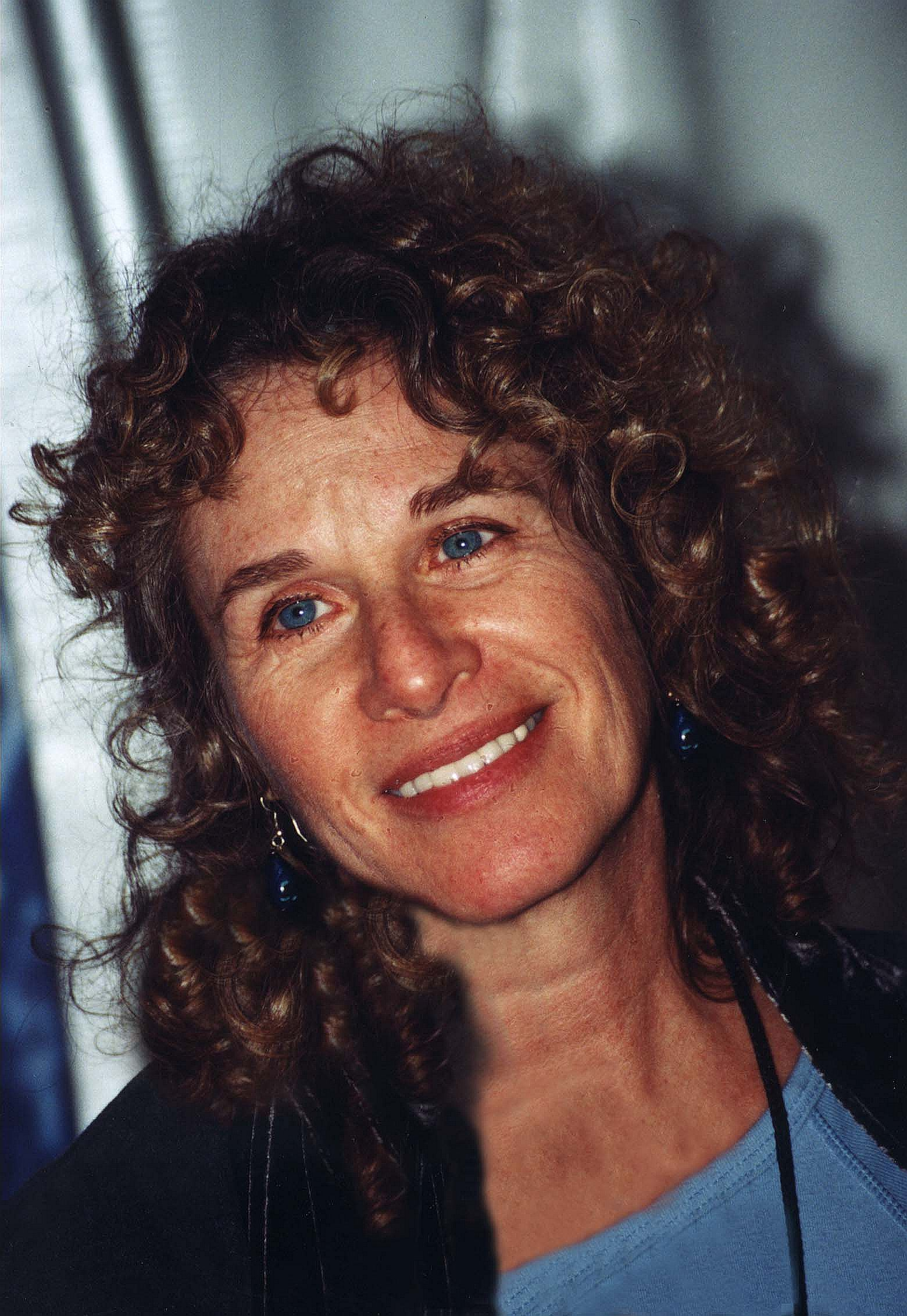
Carole King on Earth Day 2000

After relocating to Idaho in 1977, King became involved in environmental issues. Since 1990, she has been working with the Alliance for the Wild Rockies and other groups toward the passage of the Northern Rockies Ecosystem Protection Act (NREPA). King has testified on Capitol Hill three times on behalf of NREPA: in 1994, 2007, and again in 2009.

King is also a supporter of the Democratic Party. In 2003, she began campaigning for John Kerry, performing in private homes for caucus delegates during the Democratic primaries. On July 29, 2004, she made a short speech and sang at the Democratic National Convention about two hours before Kerry made his acceptance speech for the Democratic nomination for president. King continued her support of Kerry throughout the general election. When Kerry was named Secretary of State in 2013, she campaigned with US Representative Ed Markey, the Democratic nominee to succeed Kerry in a special election.

In 2008, King appeared on the March 18 episode of The Colbert Report, touching on her politics again. She said she was supporting Hillary Clinton and said the choice had nothing to do with gender. She also said she would have no issues if Barack Obama won the election. Before the show's conclusion, she returned to the stage to perform "I Feel the Earth Move".

On October 6, 2014, she performed at a Democratic fundraiser at the Beverly Wilshire Hotel in Beverly Hills, California, attended by Vice President Joe Biden.

On January 21, 2017, King marched in the 2017 Women's March in Stanley, Idaho, carrying a sign that said "One Small Voice." In an op-ed for The Huffington Post, she wrote she carried that message because "I've never stopped believing that one small voice plus millions of other small voices is exactly how we change the world."

King endorsed Kamala Harris in the 2024 US presidential election.

== Legacy ==
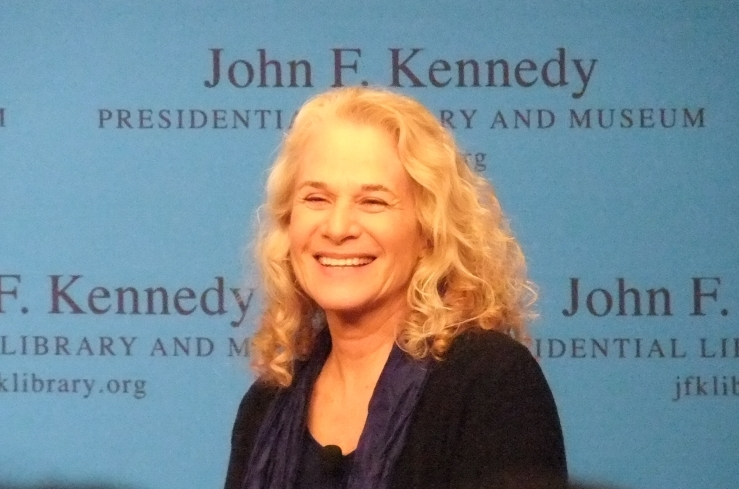
King during an interview at the JFK Presidential Library, Boston, Mass., April 12, 2012

An all-star roster of artists paid tribute to King on the 1995 album Tapestry Revisited: A Tribute to Carole King. From the album, Rod Stewart's version of "So Far Away" and Celine Dion's recording of "A Natural Woman" were both Adult Contemporary chart hits. Other artists who appeared on the album included Amy Grant ("It's Too Late"), Richard Marx ("Beautiful"), Aretha Franklin ("You've Got a Friend"), Faith Hill ("Where You Lead"), and the Bee Gees ("Will You Love Me Tomorrow?").

Former Monkee Micky Dolenz released King for a Day, a tribute album consisting of songs written or co-written by King, in 2010. The album includes "Sometime in the Morning", a King-penned song originally recorded by the Monkees in 1967. Dolenz had previously recorded another of King's Monkees compositions, "Porpoise Song", on his lullaby-themed CD Micky Dolenz Puts You to Sleep.

Many other cover versions of King's work have appeared over the years. Among the most notable are:

- "You've Got a Friend" was a No. 1 hit for James Taylor in 1971 and a Top 40 hit for Roberta Flack and Donny Hathaway that same year.
- Barbra Streisand had a top 40 hit in 1972 with "Where You Lead" twice—by itself and as part of a live medley with "Sweet Inspiration".
- "Locomotion" was recorded by Grand Funk in 1974 and went to Number 1.
- Helen Reddy covered two Carole King penned tunes: the first was "No Sad Song" in 1971 (number 62); the second was "I Can't Hear You No More" in 1976, combined with "Music Is My Life" to reach number 29.
- The Carpenters recorded King's "It's Going to Take Some Time" in 1972 and reached number 12 on the Billboard charts.
- Martika had a number 25 hit in 1989 with her version of "I Feel the Earth Move".
- "It's Too Late" reappeared on the Adult Contemporary chart in 1995 by Gloria Estefan.
- Linda Ronstadt recorded a new version of "Oh No Not My Baby" in 1993, reaching number 35 on the AC Chart the next year.
- Celine Dion recorded King's song "The Reason" on her 1997 album Let's Talk About Love with Carole King singing backup. The remake was certified Diamond in France.
- "Where You Lead" (lyrics by Toni Stern), re-recorded to include King's daughter, became the title song of the TV show Gilmore Girls.
- The Crusaders had an instrumental hit with "So Far Away", rising to number 39 in 1972 on the AC Chart.
- "Locomotion" was recorded by Kylie Minogue, having success and starting off a long career in the music industry.
- "Goin' Back" was covered by Elkie Brooks on her 1982 album Pearls II.

=== Film biography ===
In 1996, a film very loosely based on King's life, Grace of My Heart, was written and directed by Allison Anders. In the film, an aspiring singer sacrifices her own singing career to write hit songs that launch the careers of other singers. Mirroring King's life, the film follows her from her first break, through the pain of rejection from the recording industry and a bad marriage, to her final triumph in realizing her dream to record her own hit album.

The story includes material and characters loosely based on King's songwriting colleagues, as well as the singers for whom they wrote their material, and various producers involved in the creative environment that existed at the Brill Building from 1958 to 1964 and in the California music scene from 1965 to 1971.

=== Broadway musical biography ===
A musical version of King's life and career debuted in pre-Broadway tryouts in September 2013 in San Francisco, titled Beautiful: The Carole King Musical. It starred Jessie Mueller in the title role. Previews on Broadway began on November 21, 2013, at the Stephen Sondheim Theatre, with the official opening on January 12, 2014. The book is by Douglas McGrath. Reviews were mixed but generally warm. Jessie Mueller won the Tony Award for Best Performance by an Actress in a Leading Role in a Musical for her portrayal of King, and Brian Ronan won the Tony Award for Best Sound Design of a Musical. The show ran for 6 years and 2418 performances on Broadway.

== Awards ==
=== Golden Globe Awards ===
Year	Nominated work	From	Award	Result
2022	"Here I Am (Singing My Way Home)" (with Jennifer Hudson and Jamie Hartman)	Respect	Best Original Song	Nominated

=== Grammy Awards ===
Year	Nominee / work	Award	Result
1972	Tapestry	Album of the Year	Won
1972	"It's Too Late"	Record of the Year	Won
1972	"You've Got a Friend"	Song of the Year	Won
1972	Tapestry	Best Female Pop Vocal Performance	Won
1975	"Jazzman"	Best Female Pop Vocal Performance	Nominated
1976	Really Rosie	Best Recording for Children	Nominated
1993	"Now and Forever"	Best Song Written Specifically for a Motion Picture or Television	Nominated
1998	Tapestry	Grammy Hall of Fame	Inducted
2002	"You've Got a Friend"	Grammy Hall of Fame	Inducted
2002	"It's Too Late"	Grammy Hall of Fame	Inducted
2004	Carole King	Grammy Trustees Award	Honored
2013	Lifetime Achievement	Grammy Lifetime Achievement Award	Honored
2013	A Holiday Carole	Best Traditional Pop Vocal Album	Nominated
2014	Carole King	MusiCares Person of the Year	Honored
2022	"Here I Am (Singing My Way Home)" (with Jennifer Hudson and Jamie Hartman)	Best Song Written for Visual Media	Nominated

=== Primetime Emmy Awards ===
Year	Nominee / work	Award	Result
2000	"Song of Freedom"	Outstanding Music and Lyrics	Nominated

=== Satellite Awards ===
Year	Nominee / work	Award	Result
1998	"Anyone At All"	Best Original Song	Nominated

=== Recognition ===
- In 1987, Goffin and King were inducted into the Songwriters Hall of Fame.
- In 1988, Goffin and King received the National Academy of Songwriters Lifetime Achievement Award.
- In 1990, King was inducted, along with Goffin, into the Rock and Roll Hall of Fame in the non-performer category for her songwriting achievements.
- In 2002, King was given the "Johnny Mercer Award" by the Songwriters Hall of Fame.
- In 2004, Goffin and King were awarded the Grammy Trustees Award.
- King was inducted into the Long Island Music Hall of Fame in 2007.
- On December 3, 2012, King received the 2,486th star on the Hollywood Walk of Fame.
- On February 9, 2013, King was awarded the Grammy Lifetime Achievement Award.
- On May 21, 2013, the Library of Congress hosted an invitation-only concert at their Coolidge Auditorium in honor of King. The all-star tribute included performances by Siedah Garrett, Colbie Caillat, Gian Marco, Shelby Lynne, Patti Austin, Arturo Sandoval, and King's daughter, Louise Goffin.
- On the following night, May 22, 2013, at the White House, King was joined by other performers, including James Taylor, Gloria Estefan, Emeli Sandé, Trisha Yearwood, Jesse McCartney, and Billy Joel. President Barack Obama presented King with the fifth Library of Congress Gershwin Prize for Popular Song, the first awarded to a woman composer.
- In 2014, King received the Golden Plate Award of the American Academy of Achievement.
- On December 6, 2015, she was honored at the Kennedy Center Honors for her lifetime contribution to American culture through the performing arts, with performances that included a tribute from Aretha Franklin.
- In 2021, King was inducted into the Rock and Roll Hall of Fame as a solo artist.

== Discography ==
=== Studio albums ===
- 1970: Writer
- 1971: Tapestry
- 1971: Music
- 1972: Rhymes & Reasons
- 1973: Fantasy
- 1974: Wrap Around Joy
- 1976: Thoroughbred
- 1977: Simple Things
- 1978: Welcome Home
- 1979: Touch the Sky
- 1980: Pearls: Songs of Goffin and King
- 1982: One to One
- 1983: Speeding Time
- 1989: City Streets
- 1993: Colour of Your Dreams
- 2001: Love Makes the World

=== Christmas albums ===
- 2011: A Holiday Carole

=== Live albums ===
- 1994: In Concert
- 1996: The Carnegie Hall Concert: June 18, 1971
- 2005: The Living Room Tour
- 2010: Live at the Troubadour (with James Taylor)

=== Compilation albums ===
- 1978: Her Greatest Hits: Songs of Long Ago
- 2012: The Legendary Demos

=== Soundtrack albums ===
- 1975: Really Rosie

== Filmography ==
Film
Year	Title	Role	Notes
1975	Chicken Soup with Rice	Rosie	Voice, short film
1977	Bionic Boy		
1985	Murphy's Romance	Tillie	
1987	Russkies	Mrs. Kovac	
1989	Hider in the House	Tom's Mother	Voice

Television
Year	Title	Role	Notes
1975	Really Rosie	Rosie	Voice, television film
1975	The Mary Tyler Moore Show	Aunt Helen	Episode: "Anyone Who Hates Kids and Dogs"
1984	Faerie Tale Theatre	Mother	Episode: "Goldilocks and the Three Bears"
1989	The Tracey Ullman Show	Joan, Shopaholics Anonymous Member	Episode: "The Holland Tunnel of Love"
1991	The Trials of Rosie O'Neill	Tobey Kalow	Episode: "The Reunion"
1991	ABC Afterschool Specials	Johanna Martin	Episode: "It's Only Rock & Roll"
2002–2005	Gilmore Girls	Sophie Bloom	3 episodes
2016	Gilmore Girls: A Year in the Life	Sophie Bloom	Guest role

== Certifications ==
The years given are the years the albums and singles were released and not necessarily the years in which they achieved their peak.

U.S. Billboard 200 Top 10 Albums

- 1971 – Tapestry (No. 1)
- 1971 – Music (No. 1)
- 1972 – Rhymes & Reasons (No. 2)
- 1973 – Fantasy (No. 6)
- 1974 – Wrap Around Joy (No. 1)
- 1976 – Thoroughbred (No. 3)
- 2010 – Live at the Troubadour (with James Taylor) (No. 4)

U.S. Billboard Hot 100 Top 10 Singles

- 1971 – "It's Too Late" / "I Feel the Earth Move" (No. 1)
- 1971 – "Sweet Seasons" (No. 9)
- 1974 – "Jazzman" (No. 2)
- 1975 – "Nightingale" (No. 9)

U.S. Billboard Adult Contemporary Top 10 Singles

- 1971 – "It's Too Late" / "I Feel the Earth Move" (No. 1)
- 1971 – "So Far Away" / "Smackwater Jack" (No. 3)
- 1971 – "Sweet Seasons" (No. 2)
- 1972 – "Been to Canaan" (No. 1)
- 1973 – "You Light Up My Life" (No. 6)
- 1973 – "Corazon" (No. 5)
- 1974 – "Jazzman" (No. 4)
- 1975 – "Nightingale" (No. 1)
- 1975 – "Only Love Is Real" (No. 1)
- 1977 – "Hard Rock Cafe" (No. 8)

Albums and singles certifications

Song title	Certification
"It's Too Late"	Platinum
"I Feel the Earth Move"	Gold
"So Far Away"	Gold
"You've Got a Friend"	Gold
Album title	Certification
Tapestry	14× Platinum
Music	Platinum
Rhymes and Reasons	Gold
Fantasy	Gold
Wrap Around Joy	Gold
Thoroughbred	Gold
Simple Things	Gold
Her Greatest Hits: Songs of Long Ago	Platinum
Live at the Troubadour	Gold

== See also ==
- Hits, charted songs and notable album tracks by Goffin and King
- List of songwriter collaborations
- List of Queens College people
