= Been to Canaan =

Single by Carole King

from the album Rhymes & Reasons
- B-side: "Bitter with the Sweet"
- Released: November 1972
- Genre: Pop
- Length: 3:38
- Songwriter(s): Carole King
- Producer(s): Lou Adler

Carole King singles chronology
"Sweet Seasons" (1972)	"Been to Canaan" (1972)	"Believe in Humanity" (1973)

"Been to Canaan" is a song written by Carole King introduced on King's 1972 album release, Rhymes & Reasons. Released as that album's lead single, "Been to Canaan" peaked at number 24 on the Billboard Hot 100 in January 1973 and it was the second of King's four number one hits on the Easy Listening chart. The single also reached number 20 on the Cashbox chart.

Record World said that "this lilting song again displays the rare intelligence behind any Carole King composition." Cash Box described it as a "a delightful MOR/Pop smash."

Billboard said that the single, including the B-side "Bitter with Sweet" was "a dynamite item with two equally potent rhythm ballads for Top 40 and MOR."

== Cover versions ==
- A Finnish rendering of "Been to Canaan": "Olet Nähnyt Kaanan", was recorded by Anki on her 1973 album Aikalintu.
- Also in 1973, the Swedish jazz singer Alice Babs, recorded a cover on her album, Music With a Jazz Flavour.

== See also ==
- List of number-one adult contemporary singles of 1973 (U.S.)
