= Music (Carole King album) =

Studio album by Carole King
- Released: December 1971
- Genre: Pop
- Length: 40:00
- Label: Ode / A&M
- Producer: Lou Adler

Carole King chronology
Tapestry (1971)	Music (1971)	Rhymes and Reasons (1972)

Professional ratings
Review scores
Source	Rating
AllMusic	4/5 stars
Christgau's Record Guide	C+
Rolling Stone	(mixed)
The Village Voice	B

Music is the third studio album by the American singer-songwriter Carole King. The album was released in December 1971.

== Production ==
The album was written by the singer and produced by Lou Adler. The album is a continuation of the style laid down in Tapestry. King plays the piano and celeste on many tracks.

The front cover photograph was taken by Jim McCrary of King at 8815 Appian Way, Laurel Canyon, California.

== Legacy ==
Upon release, the album quickly rose to the top of the charts. It features songs such as "It's Going to Take Some Time" (US No. 12 by The Carpenters), "Sweet Seasons", a No. 9 hit for Carole King, and "Brother, Brother".

While not as groundbreaking or as successful as King's Tapestry album, Carole King Music experienced immediate success and was certified gold on December 9, 1971, days after release. It was certified platinum on July 17, 1995. The album reportedly sold 1,300,000 copies in the United States on the day of its release. However, platinum status for albums (one million units sold), wasn't created by the RIAA until 1976.

The album entered the top ten at No. 8, beginning many weeks during which both Carole King Music and Tapestry would simultaneously occupy the top ten. The album hit No. 1 on New Year's Day 1972 and stayed there for three consecutive weeks.

== Track listing ==
All songs written by Carole King, except where noted.

Side one

1. "Brother, Brother" – 3:00
2. "It's Going to Take Some Time" (Carole King, Toni Stern) – 3:35
3. "Sweet Seasons" (Carole King, Toni Stern) – 3:15
4. "Some Kind of Wonderful" (Carole King, Gerry Goffin) – 3:07
5. "Surely" – 4:58
6. "Carry Your Load" – 2:52

Side two

1. "Music" – 3:50
2. "Song of Long Ago" – 2:44
3. "Brighter" – 2:46
4. "Growing Away from Me" – 3:03
5. "Too Much Rain" (Carole King, Toni Stern) – 3:35
6. "Back to California" – 3:23

== Personnel ==
Musicians

- Carole King – vocals, piano, electric piano, electric celeste, backing vocals
- Ralph Schuckett – organ on "Sweet Seasons" and "Surely", electric piano on "Back to California", electric celeste on "Growing Away from Me"
- Danny Kortchmar – acoustic and electric guitars; backing vocals on "Song of Long Ago"
- James Taylor – acoustic guitar on "Some Kind of Wonderful", "Song of Long Ago" and "Too Much Rain", backing vocals on "Song of Long Ago", backing vocals refrain on "Some Kind of Wonderful"
- Charles Larkey – electric and acoustic bass guitar
- Joel O'Brien – drums
- Russ Kunkel – drums on "Back to California"
- Ms. Bobbye Hall – congas, bongos, tambourine
- Teresa Calderon – congas on "Brother, Brother"
- Curtis Amy – tenor saxophone on "Brother, Brother", Sweet Seasons" and "Music", electric flute on "Surely"
- Oscar Brashear – flugelhorn on "Sweet Seasons" and "Carry Your Load"
- William Green – woodwind, flute, saxophone
- Buddy Collette – woodwind, flute, saxophone
- Ernest Watts – woodwind, flute, saxophone
- Plas Johnson – woodwind, flute, saxophone
- Mike Altschul – woodwind, flute, saxophone
- Abigale Haness – backing vocals on "Some Kind of Wonderful", "Surely", "Music", "Brighter" and "Growing Away from Me"
- Merry Clayton – backing vocals "second woooh" on "Back to California"

Production

- Lou Adler – producer
- Hank Cicalo – engineer
- Norm Kinney – assistant engineer
- Roland Young – art direction
- Chuck Beeson – design
- Jim McCrary – photography

== Charts ==
=== Weekly charts ===
Chart (1972)	Peak position
Australia (Kent Music Report)	5
Canadian RPM Albums Chart	2
Japanese Oricon Albums Chart	2
Norwegian VG-lista Albums Chart	10
UK Albums Chart	18
US Billboard 200	1

=== Year-end charts ===
Chart (1972)	Rank
U.S. Billboard Year-End	9

== Certifications ==
Certifications for Music
Region	Certification	Certified units/sales
United States (RIAA)	Platinum	1,000,000^{^}
^{^} Shipments figures based on certification alone.
