= Fantasy (Carole King album) =

Studio album by Carole King
- Released: June 1973
- Studio: A&M (Hollywood)
- Genres: Blue-eyed soul, soft rock
- Length: 40:33
- Labels: Ode / A&M (Original Issue); Ode / Epic (Re-issue)
- Producer: Lou Adler

Carole King chronology
| Rhymes and Reasons (1972) | Fantasy (1973) | Wrap Around Joy (1974) |

Fantasy is the fifth album by American singer-songwriter Carole King, released in 1973. At the time of its release, it climbed to number six on the US Billboard 200 album chart and has remained highly regarded by her fans over the ensuing decades. Presented as a sort of song cycle, the album opens and closes with two versions of the title song, and the songs on each side segue directly into one another.

The Spanish language track "Corazón" (the Spanish word for "heart", also used as a term of endearment, as in this song's lyrics) was a moderate hit single from the album, as was "Believe in Humanity". The flip side of the latter single, "You Light Up My Life", charted separately from its A-side.

== Critical reception ==
Professional ratings
Review scores
| Source | Rating |
|---|---|
| AllMusic | 3/5 stars |
| Christgau's Record Guide | B |
| Rolling Stone | (not favorable) |

Record World described "Corazón" as being "mostly instrumental and highly Latin flavored" and with an "outstanding rhythm track." AllMusic critic Jason Elias said that "'Corazón' has Latin intonations, and King certainly doesn't embarrass herself."

Record World said of the single "Believe in Humanity"/"You Light Up My Life" that "'Believe' is a fine rocking tune with great orchestrations, while 'Light Up My Life' is a gently wistful ballad." Elias regarded "Believe" as being the best song on the album, saying that "all of the elements coalesce and might make listeners wish they took the harder sound and well-meaning messages even further, even for the hell of it."

== Track listing ==
All tracks are written by Carole King.

Side one
| No. | Title | Length |
|---|---|---|
| 1. | "Fantasy Beginning" | 1:02 |
| 2. | "You've Been Around Too Long" | 3:42 |
| 3. | "Being at War with Each Other" | 3:26 |
| 4. | "Directions" | 3:58 |
| 5. | "That's How Things Go Down" | 3:01 |
| 6. | "Weekdays" | 2:44 |

Side two
| No. | Title | Length |
|---|---|---|
| 1. | "Haywood" | 4:46 |
| 2. | "A Quiet Place to Live" | 1:55 |
| 3. | "Welfare Symphony" | 3:47 |
| 4. | "You Light Up My Life" | 3:13 |
| 5. | "Corazón" | 4:05 |
| 6. | "Believe in Humanity" | 3:19 |
| 7. | "Fantasy End" | 1:25 |
| Total length: | | 40:30 |

== Personnel ==
- Carole King - vocals, piano, backing vocals, string and horn arrangements
- David T. Walker - guitar
- Charles Larkey - bass guitar, double bass
- Susan Ranney - double bass
- Harvey Mason - drums, vibraphone
- Ms. Bobbye Hall - congas, bongas
- Eddie Kendricks - backing vocals
- Tom Scott, Curtis Amy, Ernie Watts, Mike Altschul - saxophone
- Chuck Findley, Ollie Mitchell, Al Aarons - trumpet, flugelhorn
- George Bohanon - trombone, euphonium, trombone arrangements
- Charles Loper, Dick "Slyde" Hyde - trombone
- Ken Yerke, Barry Socher, Sheldon Sanov, Haim Shtrum, Kathleen Lenski, Miwako Watanabe, Glenn Dicterow, Polly Sweeney, Robert Lipsett, Gordon Marron - violin
- Denyse Buffum, David Campbell, Alan DeVeritch, Paul Polivnick - viola
- Jeffrey Solow, Judy Perett, Denis Brott, Dennis Karmazyn - cello

Technical

- Hank Cicalo - engineer
- Drew Struzan - album illustrations

== Charts ==
=== Weekly charts ===
| Chart (1973) | Position |
|---|---|
| Australia (Kent Music Report) | 24 |
| Canadian RPM Albums Chart | 7 |
| Japanese Oricon Albums Chart | 2 |
| US Billboard Pop Albums | 6 |

=== Year-end charts ===
| Chart (1973) | Position |
|---|---|
| U.S. Billboard Year-End | 66 |

== Certifications ==
| Region | Certification |
|---|---|
| United States (RIAA) | Gold |
