= Rhymes & Reasons (Carole King album) =

Studio album by Carole King
- Released: October 1972
- Recorded: A&M (Hollywood)
- Genres: Rock; pop
- Length: 35:42
- Labels: Ode / A&M (Original Issue); Ode / Epic (Re-issue)
- Producer: Lou Adler

Carole King chronology
Carole King Music (1971)	Rhymes & Reasons (1972)	Fantasy (1973)

Professional ratings
Review scores
Source	Rating
AllMusic	3/5 stars
Christgau's Record Guide	C
Rolling Stone	(mixed)

Rhymes & Reasons is the fourth album by American singer-songwriter Carole King. Released in 1972, the album features a single "Been to Canaan", which topped the Billboard Adult Contemporary chart and peaked at number 24 on the Pop chart. The album itself also became a hit, reaching number two on the Billboard 200 chart.

== Track listing ==
All songs by Carole King, additional writers where noted.

Side one

1. "Come Down Easy" (Toni Stern) - 3:06
2. "My My She Cries" (Toni Stern) - 2:19
3. "Peace in the Valley" (Toni Stern) - 3:23
4. "Feeling Sad Tonight" (Toni Stern) - 3:13
5. "The First Day in August" (Charles Larkey) - 2:50
6. "Bitter with the Sweet" – 2:29

Side two

1. "Goodbye Don't Mean I'm Gone" – 3:34
2. "Stand Behind Me" – 2:29
3. "Gotta Get Through Another Day" – 2:35
4. "I Think I Can Hear You" – 3:26
5. "Ferguson Road" (Gerry Goffin) - 2:40
6. "Been to Canaan" – 3:38

== Personnel ==
- Carole King – vocals, piano, clavinet, Wurlitzer, Fender Rhodes
- Charles Larkey – bass guitar, double bass
- Harvey Mason – drums, vibraslap
- Ms. Bobbye Hall – tambourine, shaker, bells, congas, bongos
- Daniel Kortchmar – electric guitar
- David T. Walker – electric guitar
- Red Rhodes – steel guitar
- Harry "Sweets" Edison – flugelhorn, trumpet
- Robert "Bobby" Bryant – flugelhorn, trumpet
- George Bohanon – trombone
- Ernie Watts – flute

String section:
Conducted and arranged by David Campbell and Norman Kurban

- David Campbell and Carole Mukogawa – viola
- Terry King and Nathaniel Rosen – cellos
- Charles Larkey – string bass
- Barry Socher, Eliot Chapo, Marcy Dicterow, Gordon Marron, Sheldon Sanov and Polly Sweeney – violin

Additional credits

- Hank Cicalo – engineer
- Steve Mitchell – assistant engineer
- Chuck Beeson – graphic concept and design
- Jim McCrary – photography

== Charts ==
=== Weekly charts ===
Chart (1972–73)	Position
Australia (Kent Music Report)	19
Canadian RPM Albums Chart	1
Japanese Oricon Albums Chart	3
UK Albums Chart	4
US Billboard Top LPs	2

=== Year-end charts ===
Chart (1973)	Position
U.S. Billboard Year-End	52

== Certifications ==
Region	Certification
United States (RIAA)	Gold
